= History of Barbuda =

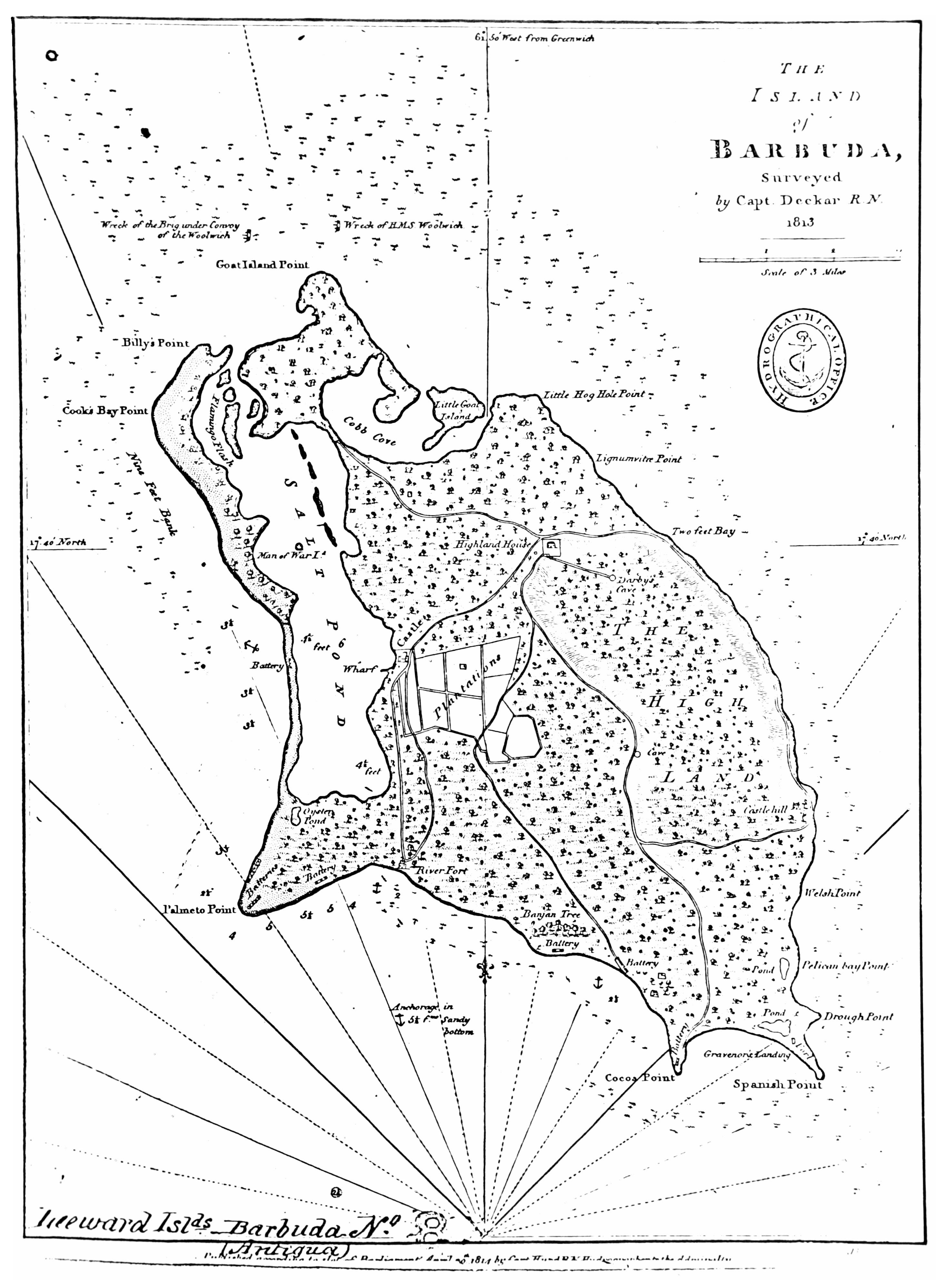
Barbuda in 1813

The history of Barbuda covers the period from the arrival of the Archaic people around 3700 BC to its current status as an autonomous island in Antigua and Barbuda. The first inhabitants of the island were hunter-gatherers that primarily lived on the island's southern coast. The Archaic people were later replaced by the Arawak, who came to the island from modern-day Venezuela and Guyana around 1000 BC. The Arawak flourished on the island between 1500 and 800 years ago. The Arawak built several villages on the island but mostly used it as a stopover point. The Arawak were likely conquered by the Kalinago, who came to the island around the same time as the Age of Discovery.

The first European settlers came from Saint Kitts, following a letters-patent issued in 1625. Then referred to as "Barbado" or "Dulcina", a Captain Smith and John Littleton led Barbuda's initial colonisation. Four grants were established on the island to prevent other Europeans from seeing the island as vacant land. Kalinago from Dominica and Saint Vincent decimated the small English settler community in a 1668 attack, with eight settlers dying and the colonisation project being left largely abandoned shortly after.

The Codrington family was granted a lease for the island in 1684, although they rarely visited and were represented instead by their attorneys and resident managers. John Codrington built a castle that became the nucleus of the village of Codrington. The Codrington family introduced the first African slaves to the island around this time, with the slaves from the initial shipment being the ancestors of the modern Barbudan people. Only eight slaves came to the island after this shipment. The original slaves all came from the Ghanaian coasts, west of Accra, part of the Fante ethnic group. They were shipped out of the port of Cormantin. The island had virtually no Europeans other than the manager, and the slaves engaged in cattle ranching and animal husbandry– the island being too dry for sugar cultivation. In the early 19th century, the Antigua-Barbuda-Montserrat colony was established, lasting until 1833. This was the first time that Barbuda was administratively linked with Antigua in practice. By 1831, there were 503 slaves on the island. Uniquely for the British West Indies, this population growth was natural rather than through the importation of slaves. Slaves had less oversight compared to other colonies, and were forced to work on provision grounds of several acres each. Slavery was abolished in 1834.

On 1 August 1860, Barbuda was formally merged with Antigua. The Codrington's lease over the island ended in 1870. This is when the Barbudan communal land system emerged. The island was later leased to the Barbuda Island Company by the crown in the 1890s, although this was short lived. The Barbuda Ordinance (still in effect as the Barbuda Act) was passed in 1904 by the Antiguan legislature and assigned a warden who served as the primary local government official on the island. The warden resided at the Government House in central Codrington. The Barbudan independence movement emerged in the 1960s. The warden continued to oversee the island until the passing of the Barbuda Local Government Act in 1976, which established the Barbuda Council. During the independence process for Antigua and Barbuda, fears emerged that the island would attempt a Republic of Anguilla–style rebellion. The majority of the population supported separate independence from Antigua. However, the British government ultimately decided to keep the islands together, enshrining the council in the constitution.

Following independence, the relationship between the two islands has been tumultuous. Voters on the island tended to deviate from national trends, and the central and local governments frequently clashed over sand mining. Following the election of the United Progressive Party government in 2004, close ties with the Barbuda People's Movement eventually led to an easing of tensions and the formal enshrining of Barbudan land rights in the law. These good ties ended in 2017 after the passing of Hurricane Irma, which passed directly over the island and destroyed almost all infrastructure. This began an ongoing sociopolitical crisis that revived the independence movement and led to significant changes to land legislation.

== Pre-colonisation (–1625) ==
People have lived on Barbuda since around 3700 BC. The Archaic Age people, incorrectly referred to as the "Ciboney", were the first to live here. These people arrived in Barbuda by canoe and lived as hunter-gatherers in small bands. Scholars disagree on whether they came from South America, the Greater Antilles, or from the Yucatán peninsula in Mexico. The oldest carbon dated artifact in the country dates to c. 3685 BC at The River. Around this time was also when the first sand dunes formed at Palmetto Point. These Archaic people did not live in villages, and instead were dispersed at various points in the island including at Suffers near Spanish Point, and Indian Town at Two Foot Bay. These people made tools, primarily with shells, and remnants of these tools continue to be found at the Strombus Line, which follows the southern coastline about a quarter kilometre inland. This line is considered to be a paleoshoreline and was likely once an important trading centre in the pre-Columbian Lesser Antilles. Along the Strombus Line, tools have been found that were used for digging queen conchs out of their shells, and flint-based tools were also sourced from the Flinty Bay in Antigua. These people were known to be active at areas today known as Boiling Rocks, Codrington, River, Sucking Hole, Factory, and Goat Pen.

The Archaic people were replaced by people usually classed as Arawak, usually identified with the Taíno. The Arawak lived on the island from around 1000 BC, and established several villages in the highlands and around Gravenor Bay. They were an agricultural people and described as 'peace-loving' by Spanish conquistadors. They did not have a hierarchical social structure. The earliest remains of these people are located at the Seaview site at Two Foot Bay. Staple crops of included sweet potatoes, corn, peanuts, cotton, and tobacco. They also farmed fruits, medicinal plants, and vegetables. Their main staple was cassava. They also ate seafood products, eggs, iguanas, turtles, and small mammals. They made pottery known as Saladoid. The period between 1,500 and 800 years ago saw the largest settlement, although many only made stopovers and seasonal visits. There were several known villages during this time including ones located at Sufferers, Indian Town, Highland Road, Guava and Welches.

The Kalinago called Barbuda Wa'omoni. This is thought to mean "island of herons", although broader interpretations state that it could also mean "island of weather birds" or "island of large birds", likely in reference to the frigatebirds native to the region. These Kalinago came from Dominica and Saint Vincent, and it was also around this time that Christopher Columbus came to the region. The nature of Columbus's contact with Barbuda is unknown. The most recent carbon dated site attributed to indigenous people is from around 1520 at Indian Town.

== Initial colonisation (1625–1684) ==
Under a Letters Patent granted to the Earl of Carlisle in 1625, Captain Smith and John Littleton attempted to colonize Barbuda (referred to as "Barbado") from Saint Kitts. People in Saint Kitts knew the island as "Dulcina", assuming it to be good for colonisation. To their surprise, the island was barren and they left shortly after. It is also likely that attacks from the Kalinago disrupted this settlement. One source describes present-day Codrington as the main settlement in 1666, and one attack on the colonists took place in 1668. The Kalinago that participated in this attack likely came from Dominica and Saint Vincent, and about 240 Kalinago attacked the 20 English inhabitants. They decided to raid the building that the family of Captain Francis Nathan was staying at. Nathan and several other English men were killed, while Nathan's wife, two children, and a servant among others managed to escape. The natives were noted to have been consuming alcoholic beverages during the attack.

By the 1660s, several Europeans were farming on the island. Lord Willoughby granted the island to four lessees to hinder a potential Dutch or Kalinago attack on Barbuda. Some of the people on the island included about twenty men living together with the goal of exporting goods to surrounding colonies. The lease explicitly stated that Barbuda was a dependency of Antigua. Of the four lessees, three (Samuel Winthrop, Joseph Lees, and Francis Samson) were also members of the elite on Antigua. A letter dated to 22 November 1676 noted that about twenty servants lived on the island, keeping stocks of horses, cattle, and sheep. It was thought that this activity could aid in provisioning for the Royal Navy.

== Codrington rule (1684–1870) ==
=== Establishment of the estate (1684–1761) ===
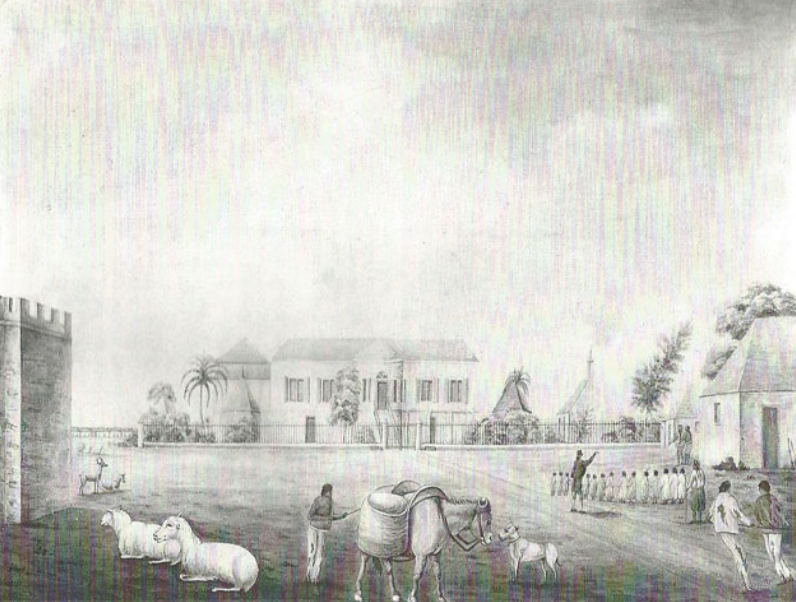
Watercolor of the Codrington Castle, c. 1818

Brothers Christopher Codrington II and John Codrington were leased Barbuda by King Charles II in 1684. The family leased the island for one "fat sheep" per annum if demanded. This lease gave them significant autonomy although they were still subordinate de jure (although not de facto) to the governor of the Leeward Islands based in Antigua. The lease was renewed in 1705, 1800, and 1856. Their primary goal was to make Barbuda a centre for livestock rearing and as a resource hub for Codrington estates elsewhere in the Caribbean. John Codrington lived on Barbuda until he died in 1688. He ordered the self-funded construction of the Codrington Castle, which was the administrative centre of the island. It was protected by a stone wall and eventually became primary structure in the village. The Codringtons were the first to bring slaves to Barbuda, with the resident manager and a few servants usually being the only white people on the island. There was only one major shipment of slaves to Barbuda. Prior to being stolen, the ancestors of the Barbudan people lived in inland regions near the port of Cormantin. Cormantin is the port where the Barbudan ancestors were shipped out of. These people were all of Fante ancestry. Following this one shipment, only eight slaves were recorded as being imported into the island. Slaves were assigned provision grounds between 2 and 10 acres– described as a quasi-feudal system by the Black Agenda Report. The primary activity of these slaves was animal husbandry. This caused life expectancies in Barbuda to be higher than surrounding sugar-producing islands such as Antigua and Nevis. Margaret Tweedy wrote that Christopher Codrington III had a "usual attitude towards his slaves... he believed that owners should treat their slaves in a better way than was customary". Codrington himself wrote that "noe Man deserv'd a Corramante [that would] not treat Him like a Friend rather than a Slave." Slaves were threatened with exportation to Antigua if they rebelled. Other than the 1780s, children were rarely separated from their parents. John Bermingham led a French attack on the castle in March 1710. French forces destroyed several buildings in Codrington and took several slaves, servants, and livestock. This was also the year that Christopher Codrington III died (unrelated to the attack), who at the time managed the family affairs. He divided his share of the island's interests, and allotted it to various entities including a missionary organisation. William Codrington with the help of this organisation rebuilt the castle. In 1719, William wrote that Barbuda had 92 slaves and 20 white servants. He wished that the island would eventually become an agricultural production centre as well. On 2 February 1720, William wrote that he wished to retire in Barbuda, and he commissioned the construction of a luxurious estate at Highland House.

In 1741, Beach's Rebellion took place, due to the 'dictatorial' rule of manager Thomas Beach. Slaves ran away and livestock was damaged. In 1743, some Spanish privateers were attacked by thirty armed servants and slaves after attempting to get provisions from the island. These privateers eventually stole a boat worth 1,000 pounds, although navy sailors from Antigua eventually caught the boat and were able to recover some goods. In 1745, there was another rebellion and the slaves captured the Codrington castle, and assistance from Antigua was required. The Codringtons worried that this rebellion would encourage a French capture.

Barbuda did not pay Antiguan taxes and permission was required from the Codrington's Antiguan attorney in order to visit the island. This caused resentment among landowners in Antigua. Several challenges were made to the Codringtons' control over the island. In 1746, William Codrington II gave a fifteen-year lease to Samuel Martin and William Byam. Martin wanted ownership of the land, and stopped paying rent as in his opinion, the 1705 lease renewal to the Codrington family was invalid. R. Wilbraihm found the lease to be valid and Martin began paying his lease again afterwards. William wrote in July 1756 that he was involved in another dispute with Governor Thomas over a 3,000 pound lease payment. This dispute was resolved though, with the Codringtons' defence being longtime ownership. The period of this lease was relatively prosperous, with the value of slaves and livestock increasing by 18,000 pounds.

=== Merger with Betty's Hope and aftermath (1761–1792) ===
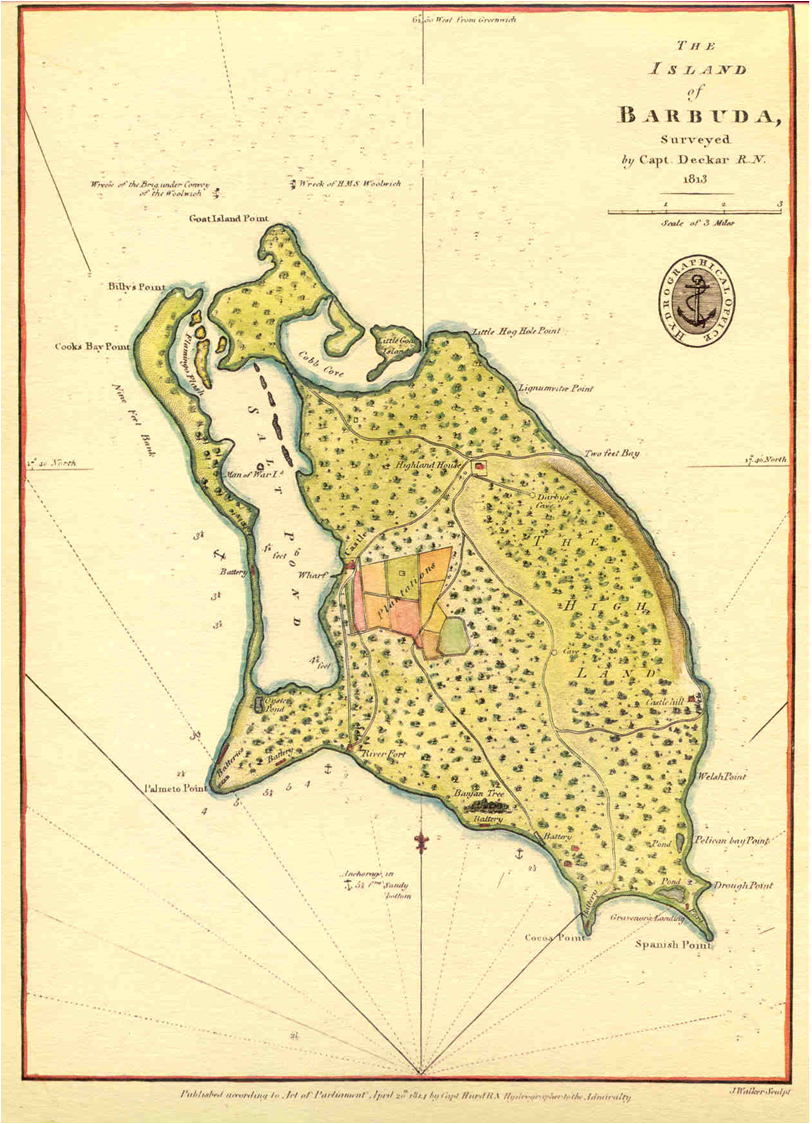
Color map from 1813

From 1761 to 1783, the manager at Betty's Hope oversaw the island. Samuel Redhead was the manager until 1779. This arrangement was inefficient and Redhead appointed a resident manager who was paid between 80 and 120 pounds per year. An agent was also paid 100 pounds a year to oversee goods received from Antigua. Most of these resident managers were incompetent or did not work well with Redhead, and at one point three were appointed in just a year. Sarah Bullock (nicknamed Sally), Redhead's mulatta mistress, also caused tension with resident managers. Redhead attempted to purchase her freedom from William Codrington II in 1771, although Redhead wanted her to continue living on the island. Bullock was essentially the unofficial resident manager and cracked down on anybody who opposed her authority. Redhead wrote in November 1771 said that he could now travel to Barbuda more and decided to build a house for himself. The most serious threat to Codrington ownership was arguably in 1776, after the Spanish ship Sancta Rita wrecked on the island. The Codringtons' attorney acted in a 'reckless' manner that caused the Spanish government to complain to the British. The family faced intense scrutiny as the island had experienced other wrecks before. Governor W. M. Burt was instructed by the secretary of state for colonies to investigate the island, and Burt eventually visited in 1777. Burt proposed that the coasts of the island be surveyed and that Barbuda should be annexed into Antigua like the various islets surrounding Antigua had been in the past. The secretary of state acknowledged these recommendations, although the American Revolutionary War served as a distraction to the Codringtons' benefit. This left the Codrington family anxious about Antiguan intervention in Barbudan affairs as they did not pay any taxes to the Antiguan government. This scared them out of taking advantage of the Antiguan judicial system, which caused harm as young Antiguan men would often hunt and cause damage on Barbuda. Due to the lack of local juries, cases much of the damage caused to the Codringtons could not be legally relieved anyways (this was later relieved when Barbudan managers were granted justice of the peace status). Redhead presumably lived with Bullock until they both left for England in 1779. William Codrington II expressed disapproval with their handling of affairs, calling Redhead a 'dotard'. Under Redhead's rule, the slave population increased naturally from 196 (1761) to 291 (1779). While Bullock was unpopular, there was no unrest among the slaves during this time, and the island profited from increased prices due to the American Revolutionary War.

Redhead was replaced by Richard Clarke following his departure, and while he promised to promote Codrington's interests, he was ineffective but died before he could be replaced in 1782. Clarke had traded livestock with persons in Antigua for his own profit. In 1779, another incident involving Spanish privateers took place, with Barbuda's attorney, Richard Clarke, being taken hostage and his boat stolen. The manager of Barbuda sent armed slaves and fired at the Spanish, and the Spanish later departed with the stolen boat, with Clarke being released. The previous attorney, a Mr. Redhead, had only left one gun at the battery. Following this experience, Clarke established a battery at Coral Group Bay, west of Coco Point, as well as another at Palmetto Point. The Codringtons viewed a capture of Antigua as the island's main security threat, and ensured that Barbuda was included in any peace treaty involving Antigua. These successive poor administrations caused the separation of Barbuda from Betty's Hope. Dennis Reynolds, who was the chief overseer of Barbuda starting in 1779 under the Clarke administration, became the manager of Barbuda for the period of 1783 to 1793. Reynolds was an Irishman and was considered one of the most successful managers of the island, although he did not work perfectly with William Codrington II. He was paid 175 pounds per year– the Codringtons were anxious to increase the salary to avoid setting precedent– although Reynolds was rewarded for tending to shipwrecks. Around this time, the position of manager was quite powerful, and he worked with three or four white overseers, paid 40 to 60 pounds per year. Most overseers only stayed for a short time, a notable exception being Abraham Webber, progenitor of the modern Webber family. Reynolds was overseen by the attorneys, who exerted some power over him. Langford Lovell was appointed attorney in 1783 and was also paid 175 pounds per year. Reynolds was considered to be relatively humane towards the slaves and made great accomplishments in livestock and crop yields. There was some unrest but no revolts in this time. The Codringtons wanted more profits out of Barbuda, and assumed that Reynolds's competent rule would generate them more money, the cause of some light tension between them. William Codrington II's thirst for profit likely did some damage on performance.

=== Christopher Bethell Codrington and emancipation (1792–1870) ===
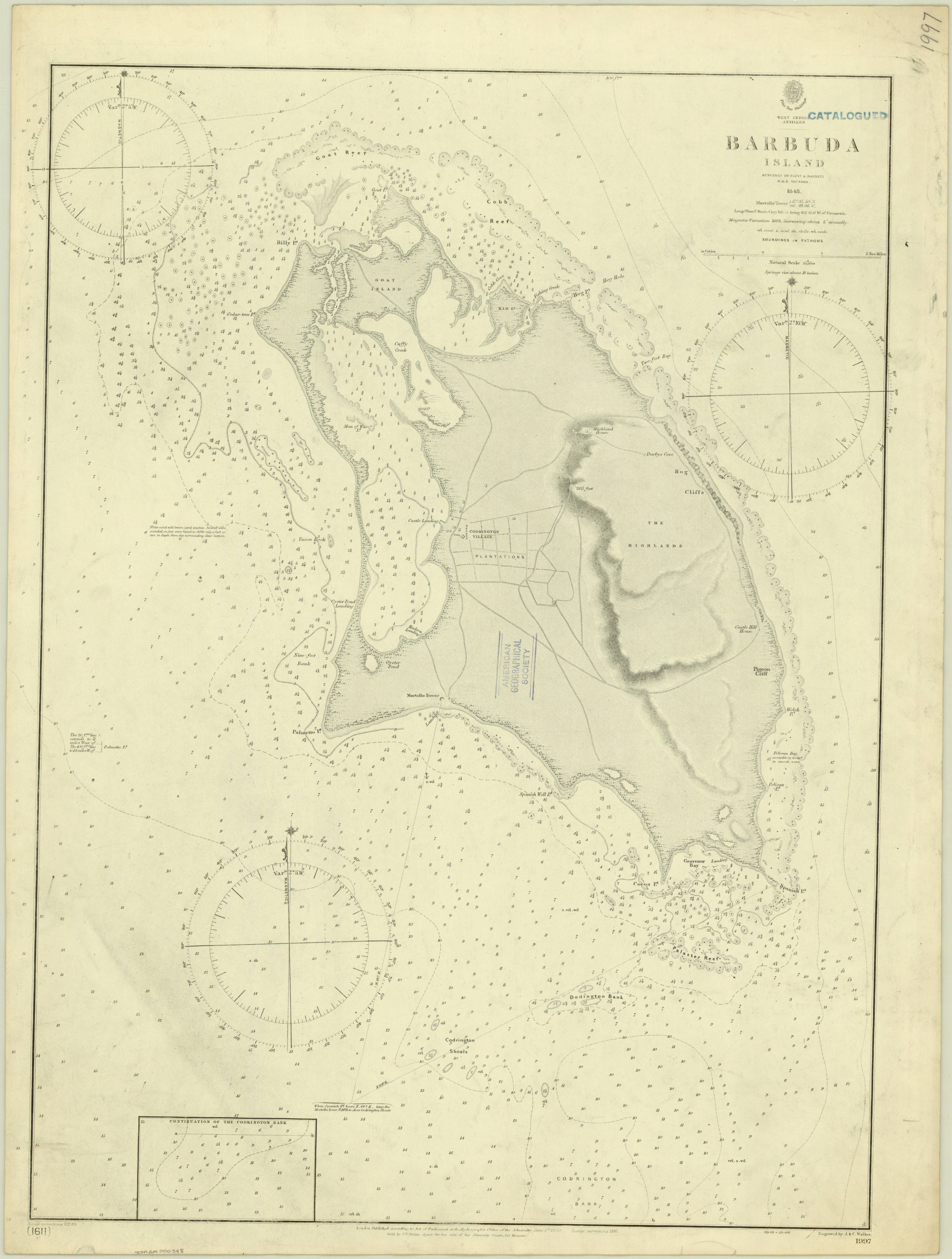
Map from 1850

Christopher Bethell Codrington ('Bethell') took over the island after William Codrington II's death in 1792. Bethell replaced Lovell as attorney and reintegrated Barbuda with their Antiguan properties. J. L. Walrond, manager of Betty's Hope from 1783, became Barbuda's new attorney. Walrond disliked Reynolds, likely causing his departure in 1793. Walrond departed in 1797, and his successor, S. Athill, continued to downgrade the manager's authority. Athill decreased the manager's salary (Reynolds's replacement William Collins was only paid 100 pounds per year), and Collins' eventual dismissal in 1801 caused Bethell to toy with the idea of separating Barbuda from Betty's Hope once more– this was eventually done to Athill's disapproval along with travel difficulties between Antigua and Barbuda due to conflicts with the French. Bethell also renegotiated the lease in 1800, which allowed the British government to build forts and batteries on the island– several were constructed. Another resident manager was not found until 1804, John James. James was also appointed attorney in 1805. James was paid a high salary of 200 pounds per year and given commissions to prevent him from attempting to make personal profit. In January 1809, Bethell wrote to James complaining of poor performance, and Samuel Martin the Younger was eventually appointed as attorney while James kept his managerial position. Bethell strongly disapproved of James's performance, but praised him as a good accountant and liked him personally.

James eventually travelled to England in 1815, and requested that Bethell allow him to bring his family. Bethell disapproved of this, although his family eventually moved to the Codringtons' estate at Clare Hall, which Bethell blamed for poorer performance. The slave population increased from 312 (1805) to 423 (1824). After James's death, Barbudans became more disorderly and John Winter, appointed as manager in 1826, eventually becoming the attorney as well. Robert Jarritt, the manager of Betty's Hope, stated that Winter oversaw the decay of Barbuda's infrastructure, but nevertheless, Winter received his promotion. Under Winter's administration, in 1832, troops were called to Barbuda to quell unrest and in 1834 slaves plundered a wreck for their own personal benefit. In 1831 Barbuda had a population of 503 slaves.

Following emancipation in 1834, Barbudans continued to work for the Codringtons, with Bethell being compensated more than 6,000 pounds for 492 enslaved persons. In 1843, an earthquake destroyed the Codrington Castle– bricks from the site were later used in the construction of The Ginnery. On 2 August 1847, a French boat shipwrecked, and Barbudans overwhelmed the crew and salvaged the goods. Another shipwreck occurred in May 1863 when 115 Chinese labourers headed for Cuba shipwrecked on Barbuda. They proceeded to become indentured servants. On 1 August 1860, an order in council was issued at the Isle of Wight, formally putting Barbuda under Antiguan administration in accordance with the Barbuda (Extension of Laws of Antigua) Ordinance passed in 1859. When the Codrington's lease expired in 1870, Barbudans began to occupy the land in common.

== Post–Codrington era (1870–1981) ==
Several failed leases took place on Barbuda until 1891. The governor of the Leeward Islands was unhappy with commercial developers, and no new leases took place until 1894 with the Barbuda Island Company. The lease commenced in 1895. The prior lessees had attempted to make Barbuda into a centre for commercial agriculture, an idea that was unpopular with the Barbudans who continued their communal occupation. The Barbuda Island Company, owned by Robert Dougall, was granted all land on the island except major roads, a burial ground, and some common grazing lands. Barbudans were allowed to retain their wells and were granted one acre per family for gardening as long as it was fenced. Dougall was unpopular, and only allowed Barbudans to get plots in undesirable locations such as The River, rather than the Highlands which they favoured. Barbudans complained to the crown over Dougall's poor management. Dougall also attempted to plant coffee, cacao, and sisal– these crops failing due to Barbuda's climate. Eventually, the company failed due to Dougall's mismanagement and declining conditions on the island. The lease was suspended in 1899. In 1899, the Colonial Office established the Committee for Establishing Barbuda as Crown Tenants, which proposed that Barbudans be allowed to farm on the island unless a suitable lessee could be found. The Colonial Office responded however, claiming that Barbudans were inefficient farmers and proposing that Barbudans that alternate farming techniques be adopted. In 1904, the Barbuda Ordinance was passed, formally establishing Barbuda as crown land and Barbudans as tenants of the crown. An island warden position was established, who resided at the village's Government House. Cotton production was also briefly attempted until it failed in 1915.

In 1915, a scandal took place on the island, known as the Polrosa Affair. The Polrosa was a British vessel owned by the government that ran aground near Barbuda. When the warden came to investigate the matter, he encountered Barbudans that were already taking goods from the wreck. A fight ensued, and the warden's wagon and boat were burned. The governor of the Leeward Islands, in an attempt to show power, threatened to impose taxes on the islanders if the arsonists were not identified. Barbudans refused to expose them, and requested that the crown protect their "ancient rights" and not allow the taxes to go through. The acting governor in 1916 refused the request, and claimed that Barbudans were unfairly benefiting from government services. Governor Bell eventually codified these taxes, although these were short lived in practice as the Barbudans protested by refusing to do work for the government's benefit. A deficit began in 1919, which the Colonial Office attempted to hide. Barbuda was removed from colonial records, and the island's lack of profitability allowed the office to avoid scrutiny. In 1921, Anglican minister J. F. Pilgrim visited Barbuda, describing Codrington as a clean village– similar comments were made in 1924 by a health officer, who also described the Barbudans as in good health. In 1936, colonial records mentioned Barbuda once more, stating that cotton production had failed and that the colonial authorities wished to revive it. This did not go through, and cotton was not mentioned again until some minor cultivation began again in 1947. 1947 is also when roads were constructed in the village. Barbuda was affected by a drought between 1952 and 1973. In 1960, Barbuda was separated from the St. John's City South and given its own constituency in the colonial legislature. In 1961, air service commenced at the Barbuda Codrington Airport.

Following the 1966 Antigua Constitutional Conference, the Associated State of Antigua was established in February 1967, the first of the West Indies Associated States. By then, most of the major British colonies in the Caribbean had already gained independence. Barbudans viewed associated statehood as potential for subordination, and the lack of rain along with miles of undeveloped beach made the area attractive to entrepreneurs, including William Cody Kelly who had come earlier in 1960. In 1969, the Barbudan independence movement emerged. This was around the time that Operation Sheepskin took place, ending the republic established in nearby Anguilla after a small revolt. The movement in Barbuda emerged after a Canadian company requested exclusive development rights from the associated state's government. The government approved this, although this decision was later reversed by the British who required that any development on the island be approved only after consultation with the Barbudans. For the first time, Barbudans petitioned for separation from Antigua, although this was rejected. Shortly after, the Antiguan government proposed giving titles to Barbudans outside of the village– Barbudans were forbidden from living outside Codrington prior to this. These plans were upended after the 1971 general election. With the Labour Party's return to power in 1976, Premier Vere Bird attempted to please the Barbudans, emphasizing his wife's Barbudan origin (and in turn his sons' half-Barbudan origin), and the associated state's parliament quickly passed the Barbuda Local Government Act, which established the Barbuda Council and had its first election in January 1977. The election was won by Labour Party-backed candidates, and the opposition decided to work on another petition for separation from Antigua. The request was submitted in 1978 and mentioned that Antigua had attempted to sell several beaches and develop the island in Antigua's favour. In 1978, Vere's son Lester Bird called for independence at the Labour Party's convention. In 1979 the Barbuda People's Movement won its first majority on the council. In the 1980 election, anti-unification politician Eric Burton won the Barbuda seat. At the 1980 constitutional conference, the Barbudan delegation stated that they wished to maintain communal land laws. Burton stated that Barbuda wanted its own independence separate from Antigua. Arthur Nibbs said that Barbudans would prefer "mass suicides" to independence with Antigua.

== Early independence with Antigua (1981–2017) ==
Barbuda "1982" Documentary
- https://www.facebook.com/reel/612497069453273

In July 1981, the termination of association order passed the UK Parliament. Some parliamentarians voted against Antiguan independence due to the perceived potential for a Republic of Anguilla-style rebellion in Barbuda. The country, now known as "Antigua and Barbuda", gained independence on 1 November 1981 with the council's powers enshrined in the constitution. On 3 November, there were significant protests led by council chairperson Hilbourne Frank, who wanted the island to be separated from the new country and become a United Nations trust territory or part of another country entirely. There was a petition for independence that the vast majority of adults on the island signed. In 1982 the newly-formed Parliament of Antigua and Barbuda gave itself the authority to decide on the Barbuda land matter. Burton eventually praised the decision and became a supporter of the Labour government. In 1983, the Barbuda Industrial Development Agency was established, led by Lester Bird's confidant Hakim Akbar. The government-run agency exercised much of the powers vested in the council, diminishing at the island's autonomy. In the 1984 general election, Burton campaigned on cooperation with the government, and in 1985 the Barbuda People's Movement led by Frank lost all of its seats on the council, although in 1987 the BPM won all four seats up for election. On 8 April 1987, the council sued the government after sand mining at dune-lined Palmetto Point caused the effects of storms to be exacerbated. In an interview around Independence Day in November 1988, Nibbs voiced his discontent with the Antiguans and stated that he had wanted to become premier or chief minister of Barbuda had it ended up being separated. However, at that year's Independence Day celebrations in Madison Square, Nibbs stated that a 'certain fraction of Barbudans' oppose development, a common talking point against the BPM's ideology. Also around this time, Calvin Webber, administrator at the ten-bed Spring View Hospital (now known as Hanna Thomas Hospital) stated that half of the adults on the island had hypertension. Hepatitis was an issue as sixty percent of Barbudan homes had no toilets and many of the toilets that did exist were outdoor facilities. On Low Bay, which separates Codrington Lagoon from the coast, there were talks of leasing it to Mel Fisher to build a resort.

In 1994, Lester Bird became the second prime minister of the country. Between 1994 and 2004, Lester Bird tightened his grip on power, and by 1998, Antigua and Barbuda was one of only four countries in the Americas not considered an electoral democracy. The BPM won the Barbuda seat in all elections between 1989 and 2014. In 2004, Trevor Walker was elected as representative for Barbuda, eventually serving in the United Progressive Party's cabinet and addressing the United Nations General Assembly. This was a time of close ties between the two islands, and in 2007, the Barbuda Land Act was passed, with the act requiring that the government take steps to increase Barbuda's formal autonomy. The Land Act formally enshrined the communal system of land in the law. In 2014, the Labour Party (ABLP) swept the UPP out of power, and Labour took cemented control over the council as well, with Arthur Nibbs becoming MP and a cabinet minister for the ABLP. In 2016, the government amended the Barbuda Land Act, slightly expanding the amount of persons in the Barbudan diaspora who could apply for land and more controversially, raising the threshold for which developments had to receive consent from the Barbudan people.

== Barbuda crisis (2017–present) ==
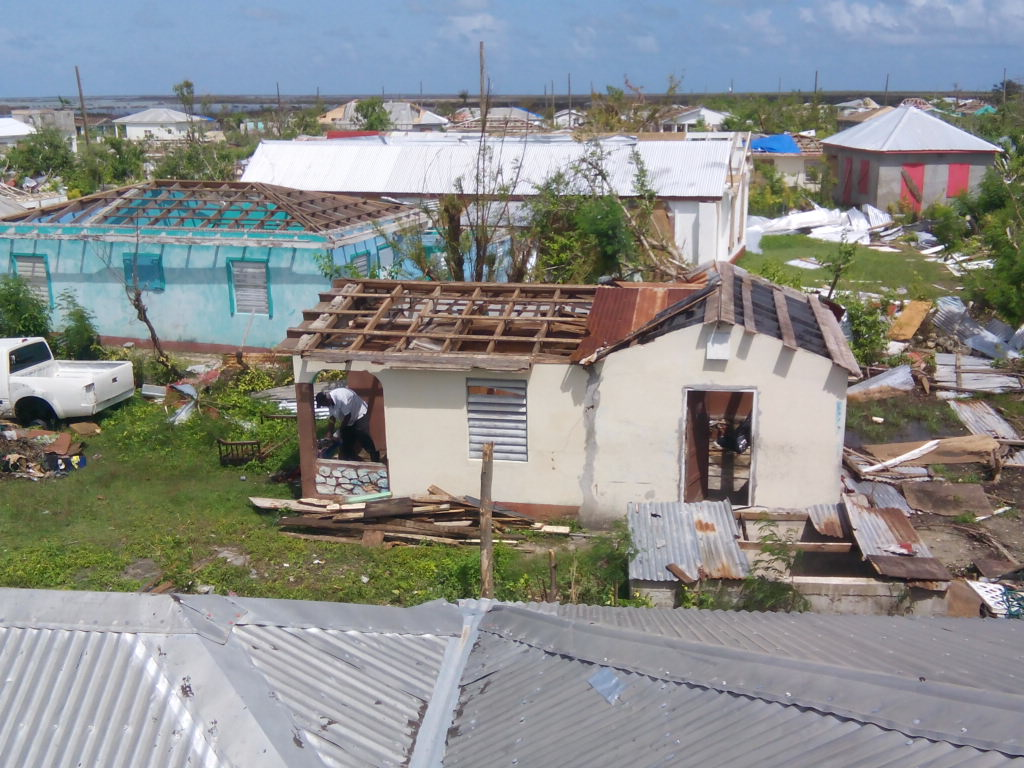
Destroyed homes after Hurricane Irma

The passage of Hurricane Irma over Barbuda on 6 September 2017 attracted worldwide attention. 95% of infrastructure on the island was destroyed in a direct hit, and due to fears of another hit by Hurricane Jose, the island was evacuated in the following days. Shortly after, construction on the Burton–Nibbs International Airport began, and a snap election was held in March 2018 even though Barbudan voters could not access polling places in their constituency. This began the alienation of the party from Barbudan politics– and since the hurricane, the Labour Party has not won any election on the island, local or national. In 2020, the council secretary Paul Nedd, the island's head of government, submitted a request to the Cabinet for independence. The government labeled the request as treasonous. In the months prior, the Barbuda Council heavily restricted travel to the island, to the government's dismay. Gaston Browne also made claims that Barbudans were inbred, refusing to apologise for the comments and tasking health minister Molwyn Joseph on 'finding a solution'.

On 3 October 2024, the international airport opened in Barbuda, although a ruling from the Privy Council, the apex court in the Antiguan and Barbudan judiciary, stated that the court could order the demolition of the airport and return to its natural state.
