= Barbudan independence movement =

Political movement

The Barbudan independence movement is a political movement that seeks the independence of Barbuda from Antigua. Proponents state that Barbudan independence would allow Barbudans to exercise their right to self-determination, especially after the start of the Barbuda land crisis, while opponents state that this movement would set a precedent for other small islands in the region to secede, and would deprive Antigua of critical resources.

The movement has resurged due to impacts from Hurricane Irma in 2017 and the ensuing Barbuda crisis.

== Overview ==
The goal of the movement is to make Barbuda an independent state. Currently, Barbuda has a degree of autonomy under the Barbuda Council, that has certain local government functions protected by the Barbuda Local Government Act and the Constitution of Antigua and Barbuda. As the constitution explicitly states that Barbuda is integral territory of the country, a constitutional amendment with a nationwide referendum would be required to permit independence.

Throughout its history, the Barbudan independence movement has been an opposing force to the Labour Party, while the United Progressive Party is in favour of a form of Barbudan federalism, similar to the system in St. Kitts and Nevis. While the independence movement emerged relatively recently, Barbuda has sought separation from Antigua for hundreds of years, especially preceding the union of Antigua and Barbuda on 1 August 1860, when the Codrington family wished to have maintain near-total control of the island. Independence is viewed by some activists as a solution to the Barbuda land crisis.

== Early history ==
The Barbudan independence movement first emerged in the late 1960s during the time of the Antigua Constitutional Conference, which established the Associated State of Antigua, one of the West Indies Associated States. The West Indies Associated States were granted near full internal autonomy, and had the right to secede from the United Kingdom at any time, their intended purpose.

In December 1967, a Barbudan delegation led by Sir McChesney George went to London to propose the establishment of a separate associated state. Because of similar and more violent events occurring in Anguilla at the time, the V. C. Bird government sent additional police attachments to Barbuda; however, as he viewed his own forces as sufficient, he did not request British external aid.

During independence negotiations, some British parliamentarians expressed concern that Barbudan independence would lead to the balkanization of the post-colonial British West Indies. Some also expressed concern for the reactions in Antigua. The Barbudan independence movement was supported by the socialist Antigua Caribbean Liberation Movement.

== Modern history ==
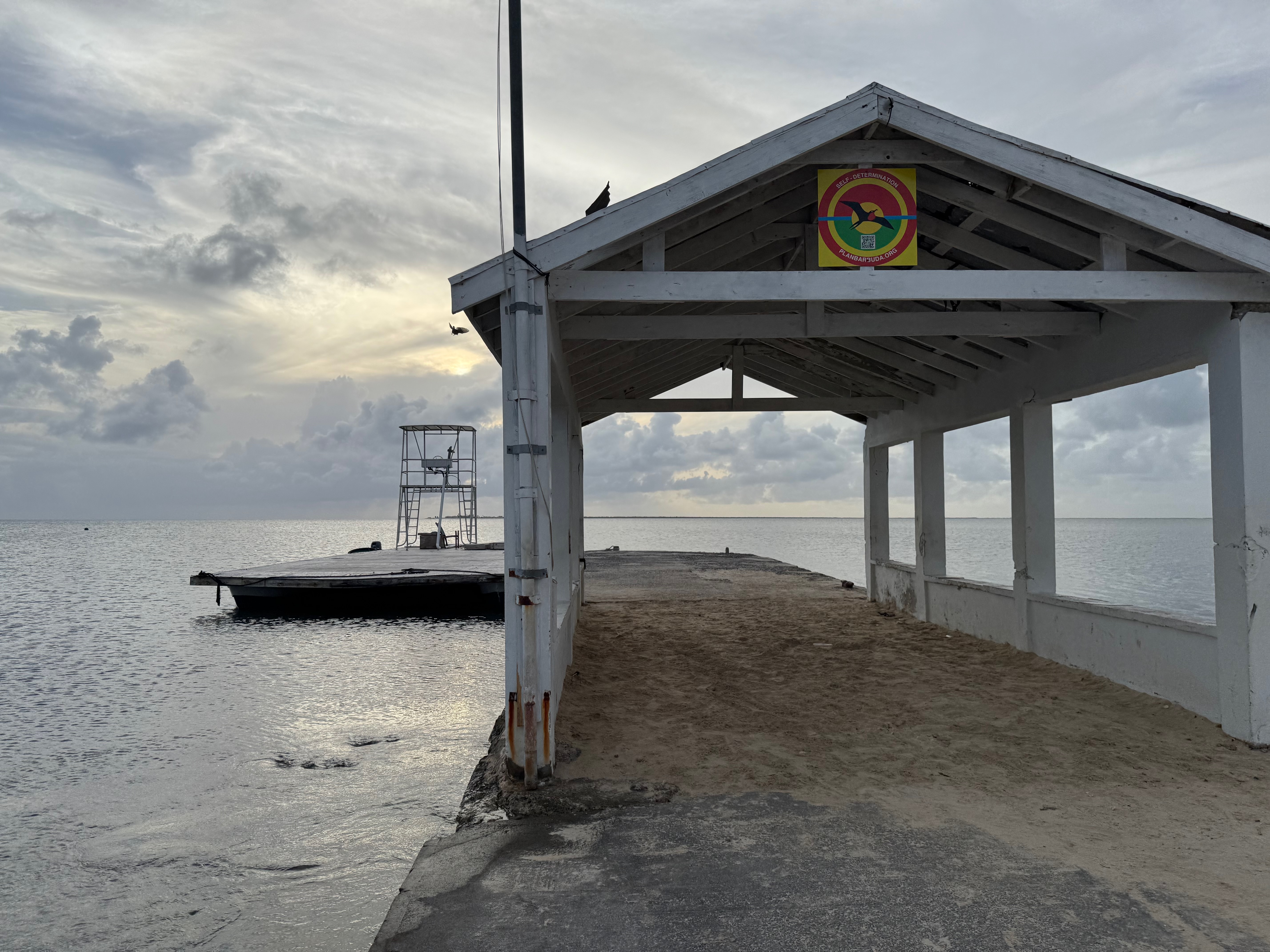
Independence symbols in central Codrington, 2025

On 3 November 1981, two days after the independence of Antigua and Barbuda, a protest led by Sir Hilbourne Frank marched through the streets of Codrington, where he claimed that 75% of people on the island supported Barbudan secession.

On 31 August 2020, a letter written by the secretary of the Barbuda Council Paul Nedd to cabinet secretary Konata Lee stated that the Barbuda Council wished to secede from Antigua. When the resolution was laid before the House of Representatives, it did not succeed due to both the United Progressive Party and the Antigua and Barbuda Labour Party opposing it. The Labour Party prime minister Gaston Browne stated that the actions of the council were "treasonous". In order for Barbuda to secede, it would have required a nationwide constitutional referendum and approval from both houses of parliament.

After the failure of the resolution, the Barbuda Council accused Antiguans of politicising the issue, and on 30 September it was said that the Cabinet never gave an official response. In 2024, Barbuda Council chairperson Devon Warner stated that all of the members of the Barbuda Council were still in support of secession.

As of February 2026, all members of the Barbuda Council are a part of the pro-independence Barbuda People's Movement.

== See also ==
- Federalism in Antigua and Barbuda
- Independence of Antigua and Barbuda
- Barbuda Local Government Act
- Local government in Antigua and Barbuda
