= Federalism in Antigua and Barbuda =

Federalism in Antigua and Barbuda refers to political theories that the central government of Antigua and Barbuda should share a certain degree of sovereignty with its parishes and dependencies under a form of federalism. These proposals were first made during the era of the Associated State of Antigua, prior to independence. However, due to disputes during the Barbuda Land crisis since 2017, members of the Barbuda People's Movement, the United Progressive Party, and other entities have proposed this in an effort to avoid Barbudan secession. In Antigua and Barbuda, the Federation of Saint Kitts and Nevis is usually used as an example of how an Antiguan and Barbudan federal system could work.

== In Barbuda ==
Since 1904, Barbuda has had a certain degree of autonomy under the Barbuda Act, which established an island warden who could make certain regulations. In 1976, during the prelude to independence, the Barbuda Local Government Act was passed, with amendments in 1981, being described in 1982 by the Antigua Broadcasting Service as giving the Barbudans near complete internal autonomy. However, in 1981 during the process of terminating Antigua's association with the United Kingdom, it was said that the Antiguan government had not enforced the act at all.

In August 2018, MP Trevor Walker wrote a letter to Prime Minister Gaston Browne, proposing that the country become a federation modeled after that of St. Kitts and Nevis. He stated that Nevis was allowed to maintain its own legislature and parliamentary system, and that the majority of Barbudans would be more open to it compared to independence. However, while the government never gave an official response, Browne responded by denouncing the letter, similarly to how he is against all local government in Antigua and Barbuda.

== In Antigua ==
To provide a degree of equality in a federal system, some activists have proposed diving Antigua into several states, each having a similar population to Barbuda. These states would be established by acts of parliament, with the states being able to make laws and establish municipalities. While no party has endorsed this in their manifesto, many individual politicians and minor political parties have proposed diving Antigua into multiple Barbuda Council-like entities while maintaining the existing unitary state.

== See also ==
- Barbudan independence movement
- Constitution of Antigua and Barbuda
- Local government in Antigua and Barbuda
