= Political history of Antigua and Barbuda =

The political history of Antigua and Barbuda covers the history of political movements and systems of government in Antigua and Barbuda. Since Antigua's colonisation in 1632, the archipelago has seen various governments and political conflicts, as well as democratic backsliding and attempts to redevelop the country. Now, Antigua and Barbuda is a fully independent unitary parliamentary monarchy.

== Colonial period (1632–1959) ==
Areas under the authority of the Governor of Antigua (1833–1872)

1951 general election

Antigua and Barbuda was first successfully colonised by the English in 1632, led by Sir Thomas Warner, the island's first governor. The Government House was located in Falmouth, the main village, which was subject to Carib attacks. During the Commonwealth of England, the colony was against Oliver Cromwell. In 1666, Antigua was invaded by the French, who ruled Antigua from the governors of its other colonies until it was returned to the English in 1667, under the Treaty of Breda.

On 13 April 1668, Antigua's legislative assembly met for the first time in Parham. The office of governor is the predecessor of the modern day governor-general, and the Parliament of Antigua and Barbuda is the direct descendant of the legislative assembly. Parham became the administrative centre of Antigua in 1663. In April 1668, the legislative assembly also authorised a plan to build a town on St. John's Harbour. On 9 January 1685, Christopher and John Codrington were granted a fifty-year lease of Barbuda. Barbuda was not part of Antigua at the time, nor was it a formal colony. Rather, it was treated as private property of the Codringtons, who ruled it like a semi-independent state.

In 1692, the parishes of Antigua were finalised, and were governed by vestries. The parishes were further subdivided into divisions. The central government occasionally authorised the vestries to levy taxes. For most of the late 1600s, the Antiguan legislature would sit in various settlements, especially the designated towns of trade. In 1702, St. John's elected its first town wardens. In 1725, the parish of Saint George was established. In 1747, lieutenant governors were no longer appointed in Antigua. In 1791, Antigua underwent a judicial reform. In the early 1800s, the modern-day Government House was completed.

After the abolishment of the slave trade in 1808, a five-man police force was established in 1813. In 1816, the colony of Antigua-Barbuda-Montserrat was established after the abolishment of the British Leeward Islands. Antigua had been subordinated to the British Leeward Islands and ruled by a lieutenant governor since 1671.

In 1832, the Leeward Islands were re-instated, and the governor of Antigua became the ex officio governor of the Leeward Islands. The Leeward Islands colony was based in St. John's, and the title of governor of Antigua was later renamed to the governor of the Leeward Islands. On 1 August 1860, Barbuda was merged into the colony of Antigua, ending Codrington rule. By 1871, Antigua was a presidency of the Leeward Islands colony, and the legislative assembly had become the legislative council. Any bill passed by the legislative council was to be assented by the Leeward governor. By 1897, the majority of elected Antiguan legislators were non-whites. In March 1898, the island's legislative council voted itself out of existence. This was due to the Secretary of State for Colonies refusing to provide financial aid to the recently crisis-hit planter class unless the island ended elected government. The island was then ruled by a fully-appointed council of 16 members until 1946.

In 1904, the position of warden was established for Barbuda, which was later replaced by the chairperson of the Barbuda Council.

In 1936, the position of governor was replaced by the administrator. The administrator resided in Government House and had similar functions. In 1946, Antigua held its first modern election, which resulted in V. C. Bird being appointed to the Executive Council, the predecessor to the Cabinet. In 1951, the first Antiguan constitution was adopted. The composition of the legislative council was changed, now to be composed of the attorney general, two nominated members, and ten elected members. This is when the Bird dynasty began to emerge, who controlled Antiguan politics until 2004. In 1958, Antigua joined the West Indies Federation, and in June 1959, a constitutional conference was held for Antigua, granting it autonomy on 1 January 1960.

== Autonomy and associated statehood (1960–1981) ==
1971 general election

V. C. Bird was the first chief minister of Antigua. The Executive Council was now composed of the Chief Minister, three other ministers, one member without portfolio, and the ex officio attorney-general. The Chief Minister had to command the support of the majority of members of the legislative council. All executive officials were to be appointed by the administrator. On 31 May 1962, the West Indies Federation was abolished and Antigua was no longer subordinated to another colony. The post-federation history of Antigua and Barbuda was largely quiet, until the 1966 Antigua Constitutional Conference laid the groundwork for the establishment of a semi-independent associated state. On 27 February 1967, Antigua gained associated statehood and adopted its present-day national symbols.

Upon associated statehood, the legislative council was renamed to Parliament, and its members became part of the House of Representatives. A Senate was also established, being composed of members appointed by the governor. The position of administrator had been replaced by that of the governor. Antigua was able to handle all internal affairs and had limited control over its defence. In 1971, Antigua and Barbuda experienced its first change of government, resulting in the Bird family being removed from office, and George Walter becoming the state's second premier. However, due to poor economic management, the Labour Party had returned to power by 1976. That year, the Barbuda Local Government Act was adopted, giving the island a limited form of autonomy, described in 1982 by the Antigua Broadcasting Service as the most comprehensive in the Caribbean.

After the collapse of Walter's government, the Labour Party successfully revitalised the economy and became committed to independence. This was the main theme of the 1980 general election, which resulted in successfully negotiations on the country's independence. The primary focus of the independence negotiations were the situation in Barbuda, due to fears that Barbuda would attempt a rebellion similar to that in the Republic of Anguilla. A compromise was reached however, by enshrining the Barbuda Local Government Act in the future Constitution. Antigua and Barbuda gained independence on 1 November 1981.

== Independent Antigua and Barbuda (1981–present) ==
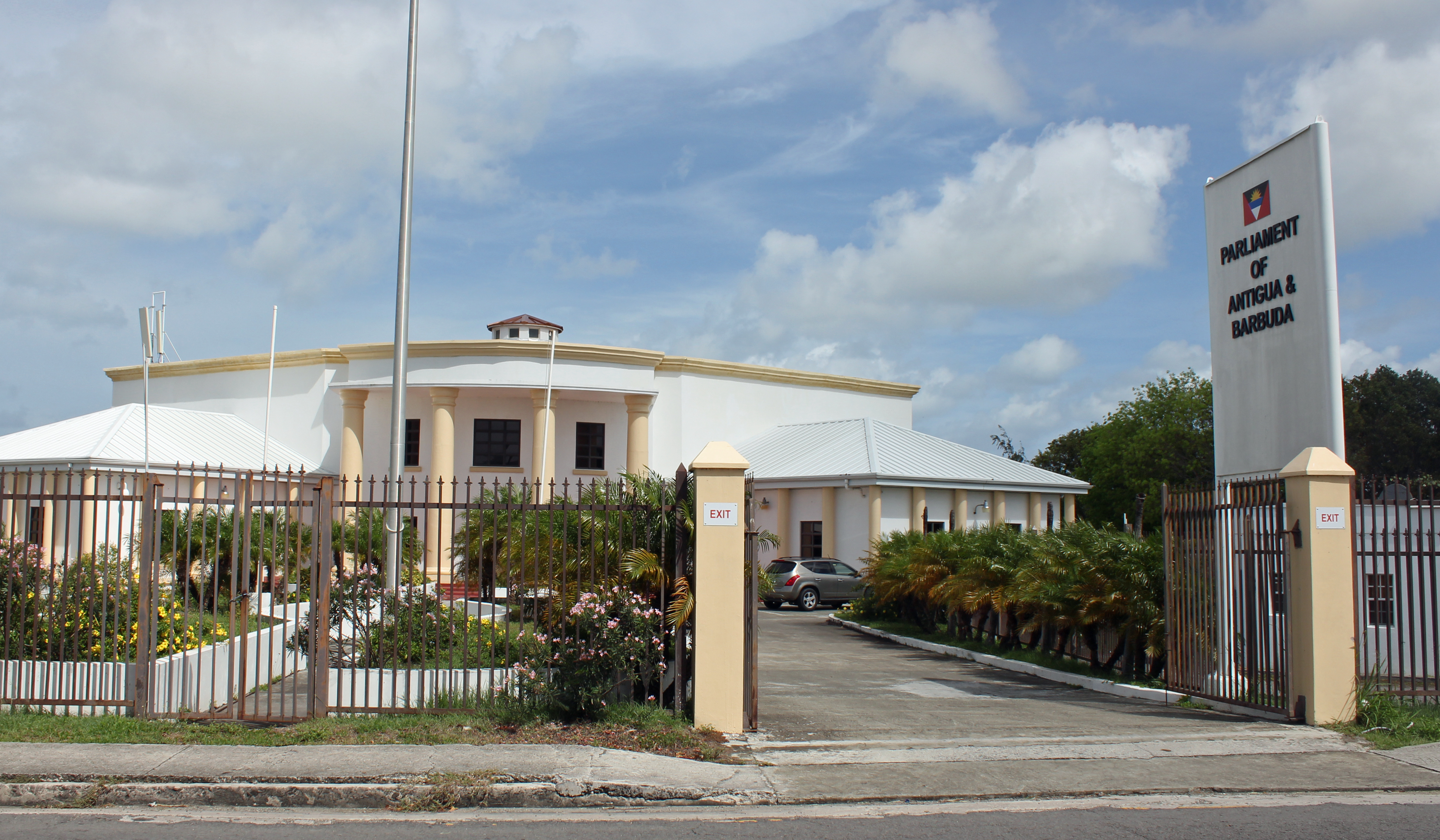
New parliament building, opened in 2006

2023 general election

After independence, separatist protests began in Barbuda led by the Barbuda Council chairperson on 3 November. It was claimed that 75% of islanders supported leaving the new country. On 10 November, Antigua and Barbuda joined the United Nations in a unanimous resolution. In 1984, the first elections were held after independence, resulting in a landslide for the Labour Party. There were accusations of gerrymandering however in the former All Saints constituency. This is when accusations of authoritarianism emerged against the Birds, and new political figures like Baldwin Spencer began to take control of the opposition. In 1986, the United National Democratic Party was established.

Following the 1989 elections, the country began to fall into corruption, and in 1992, the United Progressive Party was established through a merger of the UNDP and other minor parties. The Guns for Antigua scandal also damaged the country's reputation. Due to this, V. C. Bird announced he would not seek another term in March 1994. The 1994 elections were won by V. C. Bird's son, Lester Bird, although these elections were neither free nor fair and voter intimidation was rampant. The United Progressive Party gained a large number of seats in Parliament however, and the Barbuda People's Movement entered national politics for the first time. By 1998, Antigua and Barbuda was not considered a democracy by Freedom House.

The 1999 elections were neither free nor fair, and due to this, the Antigua and Barbuda Electoral Commission was established in 2001. State media was liberalised. A small Caribbean integration movement had also emerged in Barbuda. In 2004, democratic elections were held resulting in the UPP's Baldwin Spencer becoming the prime minister. Relations between Antigua and Barbuda also improved. However, a series of political scandals later resulted in the Labour Party returning to power in 2014.

Following Gaston Browne becoming prime minister, 2017's Hurricane Irma destroyed Barbuda and resulted in the destruction of relations between the two islands after Gaston Browne scheduled an election when Barbudans did not have access to a polling station within their constituency. The Barbuda land crisis also emerged, causing the Barbuda Council to request independence in 2020. After Labour's near-loss in the 2023 elections, tensions within the United Progressive Party resulted in Anthony Smith's departure, causing the party an ongoing credibility crisis exacerbated by the 2025 St. Peter by-election.
