= Middle Section, Codrington =

Neighbourhood in Antigua and Barbuda

Coordinates: 17°38′22.23″N 61°49′30.19″W

Middle Section in a map of the Codrington area

Middle Section is a neighbourhood in Codrington, Antigua and Barbuda. The area along with Mulatto Quarter are considered to make up the centre of the village, with Middle Section being bounded to the north by Lagoon Street, to the east by River Road, to the west by Codrington Lagoon, and to the south by the Park community. Middle Section is noted for its old winding streets, being one of the two original sectors in the village along with Mulatto Quarter. Important locations in Middle Section include the Government House, the fisheries complex, the primary school, and some churches. Most of the neighbourhood is densely-settled residential land with some pockets of mixed rangeland along the coast.
