= Government House, Antigua and Barbuda =

Government House, Antigua and Barbuda may refer to:

- Government House, St. John's in Antigua, the official residence of the Governor-General
- Government House, Codrington in Barbuda, former residence of the island wardens
