= Midlands, Barbuda =

Midlands
- District
- Coordinates: 17°38′18″N 61°49′32″W
- Country: Antigua and Barbuda
- Island: Barbuda

Area
  - Total: 28.19 km^{2} (10.88 sq mi)

Midlands is an administrative district of Barbuda. It has an area of 28.19 square kilometres and includes the village of Codrington as well as a coastline on Codrington Lagoon.
