= Squatting in Antigua and Barbuda =

Antigua and Barbuda on globe

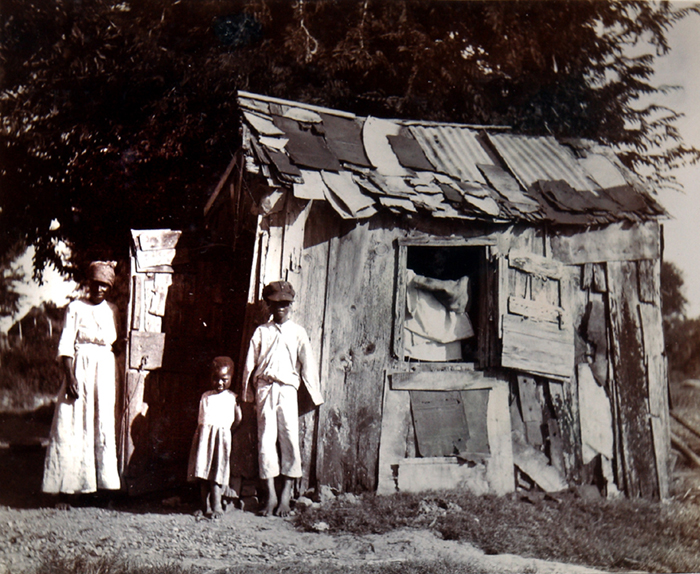
A shack in Antigua in 1914

Squatting in the island country of Antigua and Barbuda in the West Indies is the occupation of unused land or derelict buildings without the permission of the owner. Historically, native Barbudans were seen as squatters and after Hurricane Irma in 2017, Prime Minister Gaston Browne offered people he termed squatters the chance to buy their land.

== History ==
The island country of Antigua and Barbuda in the West Indies, in the Caribbean. It was formerly a British colony and Barbuda was leased to the Codrington family from 1680 until 1870. In this time, communal land ownership developed on Barbuda since the Codringtons were absentee landlords. The Crown saw the island as crown estate and since the inhabitants refused to pay rent, regarded them as squatters. In contrast, Antigua was mainly used for sugar plantations.

Antigua and Barbuda became an associated state in 1967 and gained independence in 1981. After independence, the country was ruled from Antigua, and 1,500 native Barbudans continued to insist that they owned the island. The national government, backed by 75,000 Antiguans, instead decided the island was owned by the state and could be exploited for tourism. The Barbuda Land Act of 2007 enshrined the right of Barbudans to own their land collectively and enabled them to challenge development projects. The act was amended in 2016 by the government so that development projects costing under $40 million did not need to be reviewed.

== Land ownership ==
The debate over land ownership returned in 2017, when in the aftermath of the devastation caused by Hurricane Irma Prime Minister Gaston Browne suggested that Barbudans could buy their plots of land for $1 and thus help the relief efforts. He termed the current situation "squatting", whilst a member of the Barbuda Council called the government's plan "an opportunity for disaster capitalism and cultural genocide". The following year a proposal was made to extend the plan to Antigua, where squatters who had lived on their plots for ten years or more could buy them for $1 per square foot. Areas where squatters were encouraged to take benefit were Ball Beef, English Harbour, Falmouth, Hospital Hill and Moss Pond.

In the capital St. John's, squatting is widespread due to the lack of affordable land or housing. Adverse possession can be achieved by continuously occupying privately owned land for fifteen years. As on other Caribbean islands, squatted informal settlements and slums have substandard living conditions.
