= Independence of Antigua and Barbuda =

Formation of the country of Antigua and Barbuda

- Date: 1 November 1981; 44 years ago
- Location: Antigua and Barbuda
- Participants: Government of Antigua; Queen Elizabeth II
- Outcome: Termination of the association agreement between the Associated State of Antigua and the United Kingdom, resulting in the formation of Antigua and Barbuda

The association agreement between the Associated State of Antigua and the United Kingdom was terminated on 1 November 1981. In Antigua and Barbuda, this is celebrated as its Independence Day, a national holiday.

== Background ==
Under the West Indies Act 1967, the colony of Antigua was granted associated statehood on 27 February 1967, giving the archipelago full control of all matters except for foreign affairs and defence. The act allowed for an associated state to unilaterally declare independence following a referendum, or for the monarch to terminate the association agreement following negotiations with the affected state. This associated state was composed of the islands of Antigua, Barbuda, and Redonda.

== Process ==
In 1978, the government of Antigua signaled its intention to become independent from the United Kingdom. The April 1980 general election was considered an unofficial referendum on independence, with the pro-independence Antigua Labour Party winning thirteen of the seventeen seats in the House of Representatives. In December 1980, the second Antigua Constitutional Conference was held at Lancaster House, where members of the Antiguan government, Barbuda councillors, and British officials met to discuss Barbudan secessionism and a potential constitution. While the intention of the Barbudan delegation was to separate from Antigua and form a separate territory, the British refused this idea due to the island's small population. A compromise was reached in which the Barbuda Local Government Act would be amended to give the island increased autonomy.

On 23 April 1981, the House of Representatives passed a resolution consenting to the termination of association. On 1 May 1981, the resolution passed the Senate. The Antigua (Termination of Association) Order was debated in the House of Lords on 8 July 1981, passing with seventy-five ayes and seven nays. Elizabeth II was then presented with two orders on 31 July 1981 at Buckingham Palace, one being the United Kingdom statutory instrument terminating the association agreement, and one being an Antiguan statutory instrument adopting a new independent constitution for the associated state. Both instruments were to go into effect on 1 November 1981.

== Independence ==
On 31 October 1981, Antigua and Barbuda inaugurated its parliament building, with Princess Margaret representing the Queen. At the stroke of midnight on 1 November, the association agreement was terminated, resulting in the United Kingdom relinquishing all responsibility for the associated state. Immediately, the constitution order went into effect, declaring Antigua and Barbuda independent and abolishing the associated state as a legal entity. To 25,000 spectators, the Union Jack was then lowered at the Antigua Recreation Ground and the Antiguan and Barbudan flag raised, and Vere Bird was sworn in as the first prime minister shortly after.
