= Codrington Castle =

Official historic site of Antigua and Barbuda

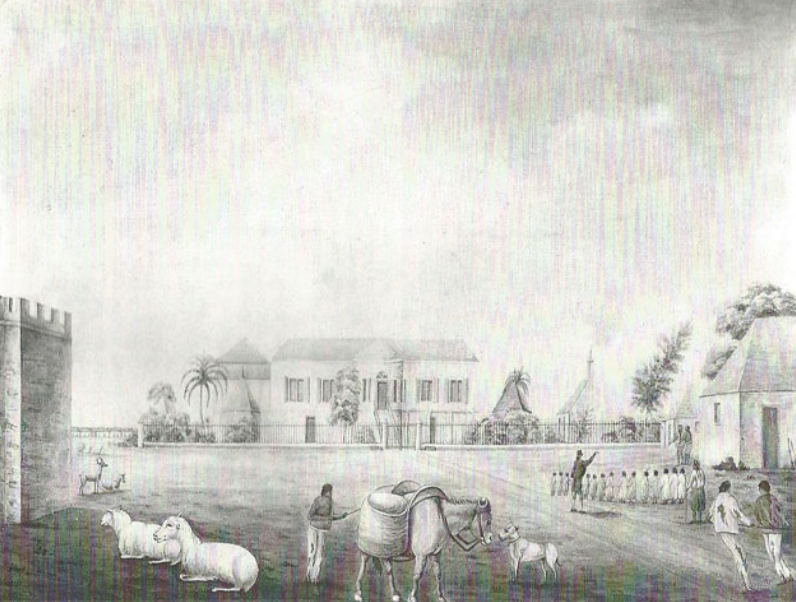
Watercolor of the Codrington Castle, c. 1818

The Codrington Castle was a structure in Codrington, Antigua and Barbuda that served as the administrative centre of the island under the control of the resident managers from the 1680s when it was constructed under the leadership of John Codrington. It was initially built as part of the island's defense apparatus against pirates, and it was attacked several times in its history including by the French and during some slave rebellions.

It was a large building, although it eventually suffered decay being described as dilapidated by 1813. The 1843 earthquake destroyed the castle although it was eventually rebuilt to a certain extent. This new structure was likely demolished under the orders of Robert Dougal, owner of the Barbuda Island Company around the turn of the 20th century. All that is left of the structure today is the well and some subsurface artifacts. Some of the materials from the destroyed castle were used to construct The Ginnery. The remnants of the castle and its well are an official historic site of Antigua and Barbuda.
