= Codrington, Antigua and Barbuda =

Codrington
- Village
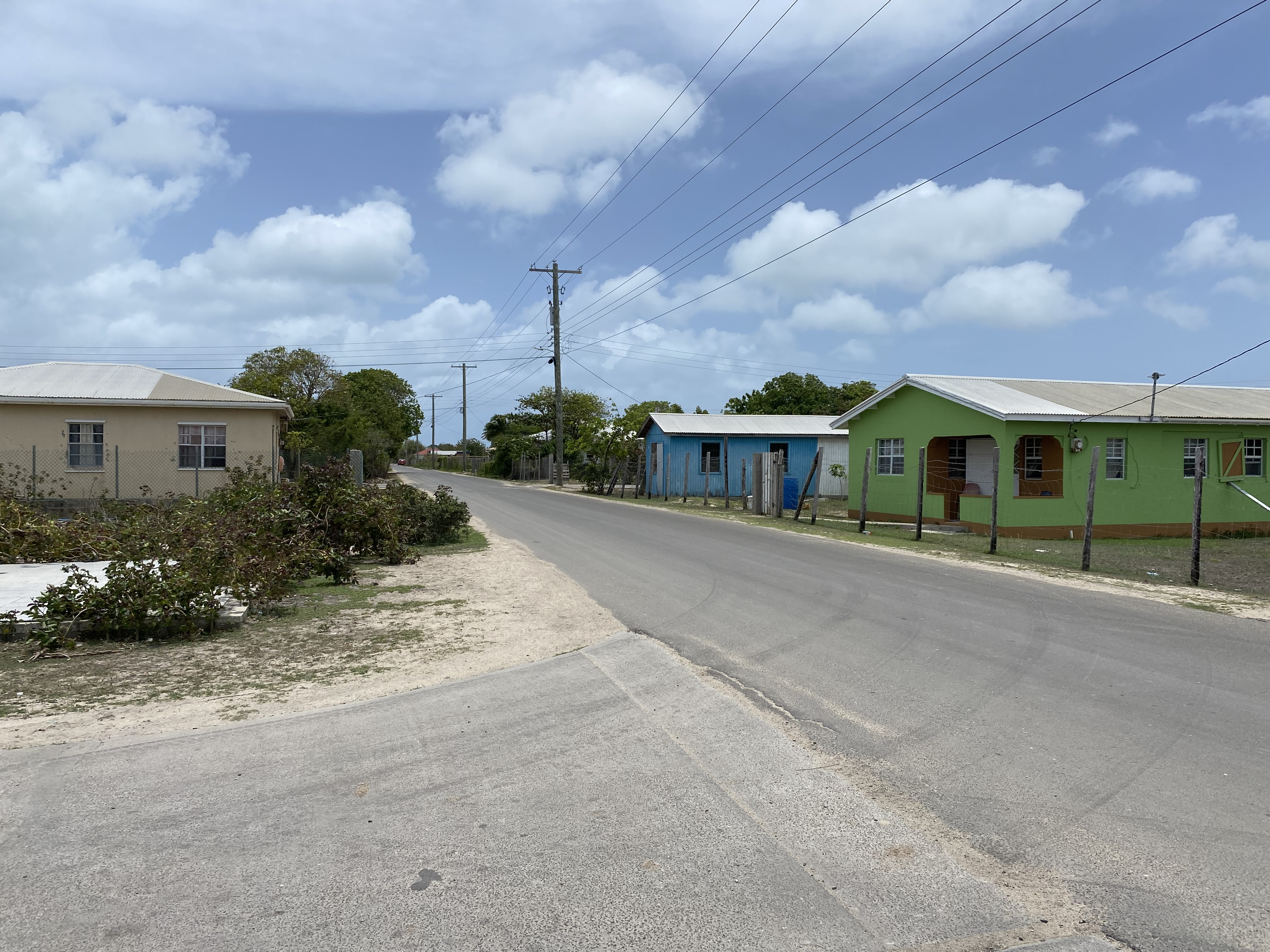
- Top Mission Street in 2023
- Nickname: (the) Village
- Location within Antigua and Barbuda
- Coordinates: 17°38′N 61°50′W
- Country: Antigua and Barbuda
- Island: (Antigua and Barbuda) Barbuda
- District: Midlands
- Settled: 1685
- Incorporated: April 30, 1904; 122 years ago
- Founder: Christopher and John Codrington
- Elevation: 6 m (20 ft)

Population (2011)
  - Total: 796
  - Rank: 23rd in Antigua and Barbuda
- Demonym: Codringtonian
- Time zone: UTC-4 (AST)
- Airport: Burton–Nibbs International Airport

Codrington (Barbudan Creole: Kaadringtin) is the only village on the island of Barbuda, which is part of the country of Antigua and Barbuda. Codrington coincides with the Codrington major division, one of the two major divisions on Barbuda. Situated on the Codrington Lagoon, Codrington is the country's northernmost settlement. The population of Codrington was 796 in 2011.

As the primary residential area on the island, Codrington was established in 1685 by Christopher Codrington and his brother John. Codrington is one of the oldest settlements in the country, and is now the country's twenty-third largest settlement. Codrington is on the larger end of villages in the country, and due to its position as the only settlement on Barbuda, is home to many specialized facilities, such as seven churches, a post office, a police station, a daycare, a preschool, a primary school, and a secondary school.

In 1685, Christopher Codrington and his brother John established Codrington as the primary residential area on the island. They constructed a castle that towered over the town, but in 1843 an earthquake severely damaged it, leaving only ruins.

For the purpose of the census, Codrington is split into three enumeration districts: Codrington-North, Codrington-Central, and Codrington-South (Airport). Codrington is also made up of different settlements: the old airport is located in the Park community, the village hospital is located in the Spring View community, and the village center is in the Middle Section and Mulatto Quarter communities.

The local government in Codrington is the Barbuda Council, which governs Codrington and the rest of the island. Situated in the Middle Section neighborhood, the Barbuda Council Millenium Administration Building serves as the secretary of the Barbuda Council's primary headquarters. The Fisheries Complex, where the Barbuda Council meets, is also located in the Middle Section neighborhood.

== History ==
=== Colonisation and slavery ===
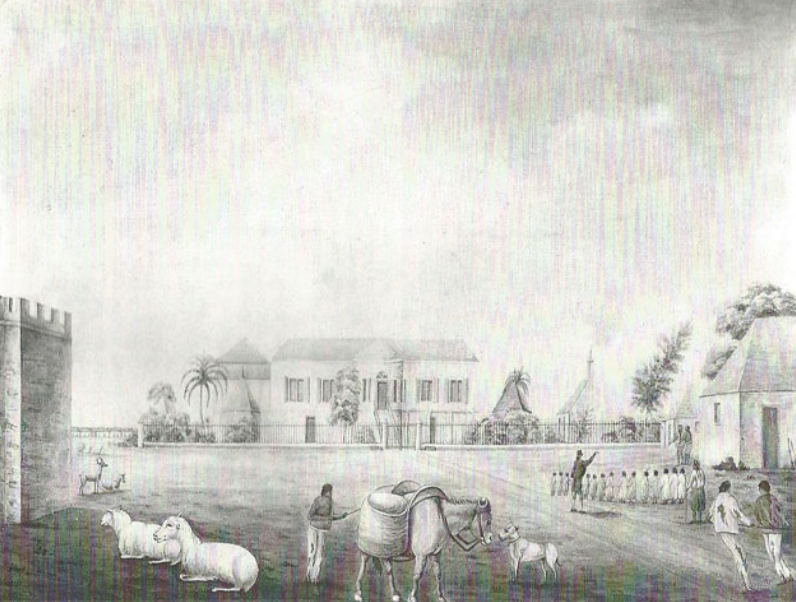
Watercolor of the Codrington Castle, c. 1818

Prior to European colonisation, Barbuda was a centre of trade in the pre-Columbian Caribbean. While many parts of the island had permanent villages, the area around Codrington is not known to have had extensive settlement. It is likely that when indigenous people first arrived during the Archaic period about six thousand years ago, the site of the present-day village was on the shores of a former small pond. Most indigenous peoples preferred to build their settlements around the Barbuda Highlands and along the South Coast. The first successful European settlement on Barbuda was a community of British farmers whose end-goal was for the island to become an export hub for agricultural products. Some sources state that these initial settlers may have inhabited the Codrington area and the Codrington family did already own some of the land on the island.

Barbuda was leased to the Codrington family by King Charles II for an initial period of 50 years starting in 1684. John Codrington moved to the island and likely lived there until his death. After the lease was secured, he ordered the self-funded construction of the Codrington Castle near the lagoon. This castle became the administrative centre of the island. The castle became the epicentre of the modern village, with most of the island's slaves living in close proximity to it forming a small settlement (others living in either the Highlands or along the coast). It was fortified by an extant wall, mostly to keep wild animals out. The castle was also intended to protect the small population of Barbudans during attacks. As human activity in the area expanded, many of the evergreen forests of the island's central plain were cleared. In March 1710, the castle was attacked by a French force led by John Bermingham. The castle along with several other buildings were destroyed and many of the people in the village were carried off, including slaves and servants. Sir William Codrington the Elder was tasked with rebuilding the area with heavy expenses. By the end of the eighteenth century, the castle's fortifications were described by a shipwrecked sailor as useless for the purpose of defending against Europeans. This was made clear in 1743 when a group of Spanish privateers landed on the narrow isthmus across the lagoon from the village. Armed slaves and servants from the village were sent after them and support from Antigua was eventually required to calm the situation. Two slave rebellions also took place in the 1740s: the first of which being Beech's Rebellion, which took place in 1741 due to poor conditions on the island. In December 1745 a second rebellion took place in the village, with the island's manager at the time, a Mr. McNish, being murdered and the castle being occupied. Eventually, the slaves seized the island's arms and ammunition as well and it was feared by the Codrington family that the slaves would attempt to side with the French. An Antiguan contingent was able to capture the island and the leaders of the rebellion, known as the "Afro heroes" were burned alive in front of the castle.

As time progressed under the Codringtons, some managers decided to make their homes outside of the village and at some points the castle was mainly used for storage and defence purposes as well as when the Codrington family or guests decided to come to the island. It is likely that slaves in the village lived in small homes constructed with wood and sedge-thatched roofs sourced from Palmetto Point. Some slaves also lived in larger slaves' quarters that usually had two rooms: a living area and a bedroom. Water was sourced from the castle and the other wells that dotted the village. With an abundance of building materials, the village tended to recover quickly from hurricanes and slaves would be housed in the castle as repairs went on. An 1837 visitor noted that the homes on the island were significantly poorer quality than those on Antigua although it is likely that this was due to a crisis on the island. Barbudans had their own gardens and there were also some community enclosures on the village's outskirts. Slaves would also travel from their homes in the village to their provision grounds, usually about ten to eleven acres, where they would farm about one day per week both for self-sufficiency and as part of required slave labour in a quasi-feudal system. The enslaved population was known to value their time on their provision grounds deeply and discontent arose when this schedule was disrupted. By the 1820s it is possible that some slaves were not required to work on Sundays and that some were permitted to fish in the lagoon freely.

=== Post-emancipation village ===
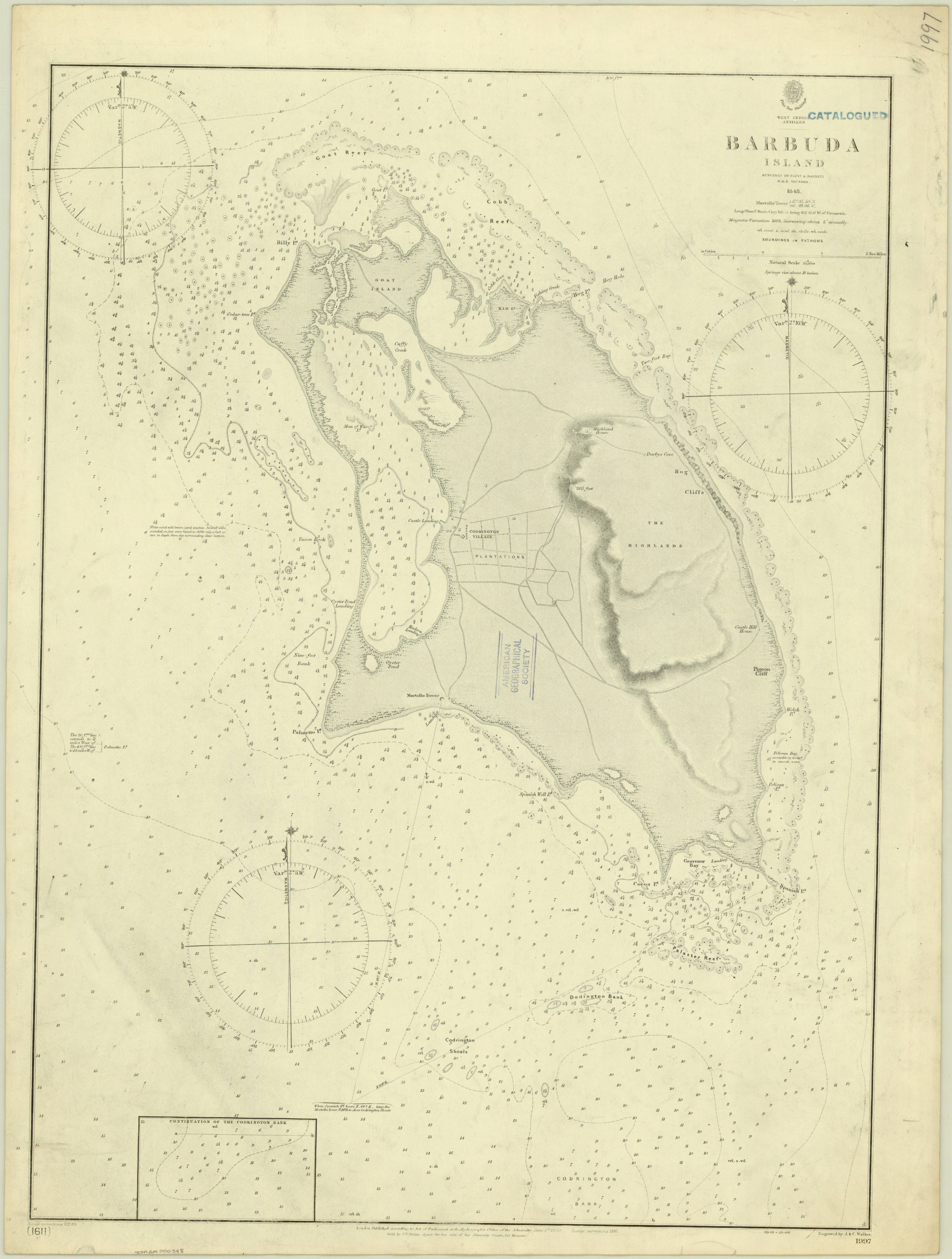
Map from 1850 showing the village

Slavery was abolished in Barbuda in 1834. As the island continued to be owned by the Codrington family, villagers continued to work for the family. In 1843 the castle was destroyed by an earthquake and the rubble was used to construct a new building in the village, The Ginnery, used for storage purposes. A new castle was eventually built that was likely demolished by Robert Dougall's Barbuda Island Company (BIC) by the end of the century. In 1860, the Codringtons issued a directive requiring that all Barbudans maintain their provision grounds within two miles of the village as the Codringtons were losing many of their sheep that roamed the island to theft. On 1 August 1860, Barbuda was merged with Antigua and the Codrington family's rule ended in 1870 with the expiration of their final lease. This is when communal land ownership is considered to have begun on the island.

Following the Codrington's departure, the island changed hands between several owners until the BIC purchased the island in 1894. The company had ownership of the entire island except for major throughfares, a cemetery, and some grazing lands until 1899. Like the 1860 directive, BIC prevented islanders from being able to build outside of the village other than some small one-acre gardens, a policy that was further confirmed by the Barbuda Ordinance in 1904 that restricted outward development for several decades. In 1895, many Barbudans refused to accept their BIC-assigned plots and instead petitioned for lands in the Highlands, a location that Barbudans had desired to settle since emancipation. The Barbuda Ordinance established an island warden who resided in Codrington's Government House. It also defined the legal boundaries of the village and codified the process of land distribution within its limits. A similar system was also established in 1942 in Bell Village (which eventually was absorbed into Codrington to form the Park neighbourhood) where residents would pay rent for 21 years and then have an exclusive right to occupation.

Many visitors to the island in the 1920s described Codrington as a clean and orderly village. At the village post office, there was a "Visitors' Book" in which an Anglican minister, J. F. Pilgrim, wrote that he was "struck by the cleanliness of the village" in 1921. A medical officer in 1924 described Codrington as in good health and as a "village clean and tidy". Leeward Islands governor also wrote in the book in 1923. Roads were constructed in the village in 1947 and the Barbuda Codrington Airport opened in 1961.

=== Independence era ===
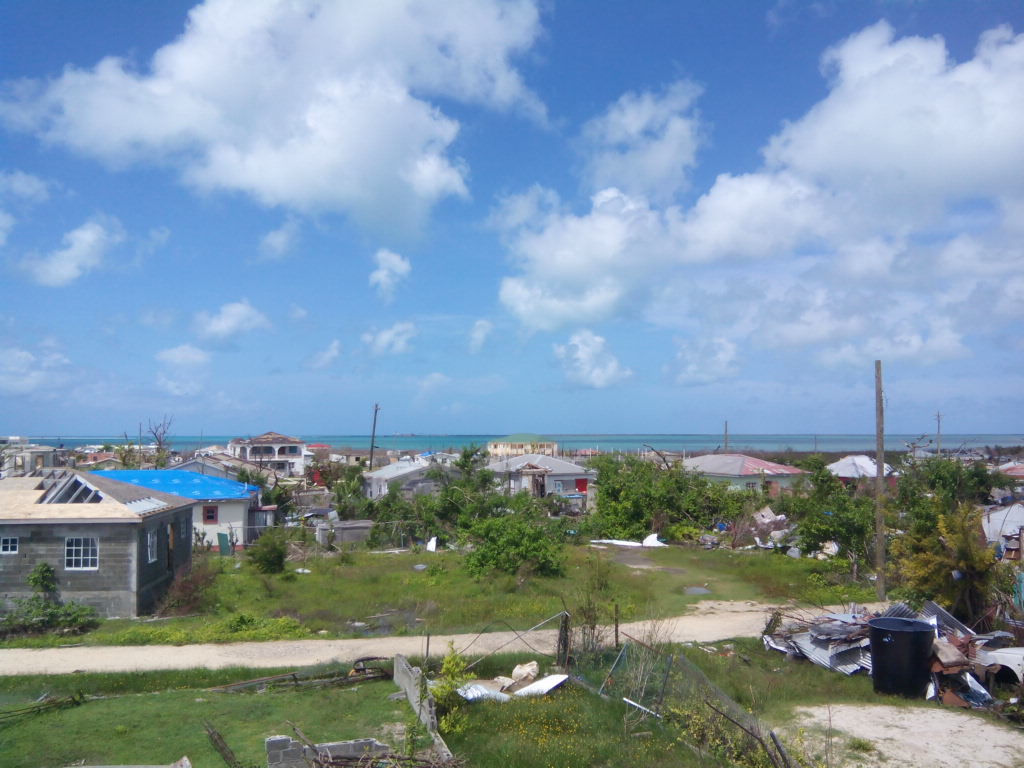
The village in 2017 following the Hurricane

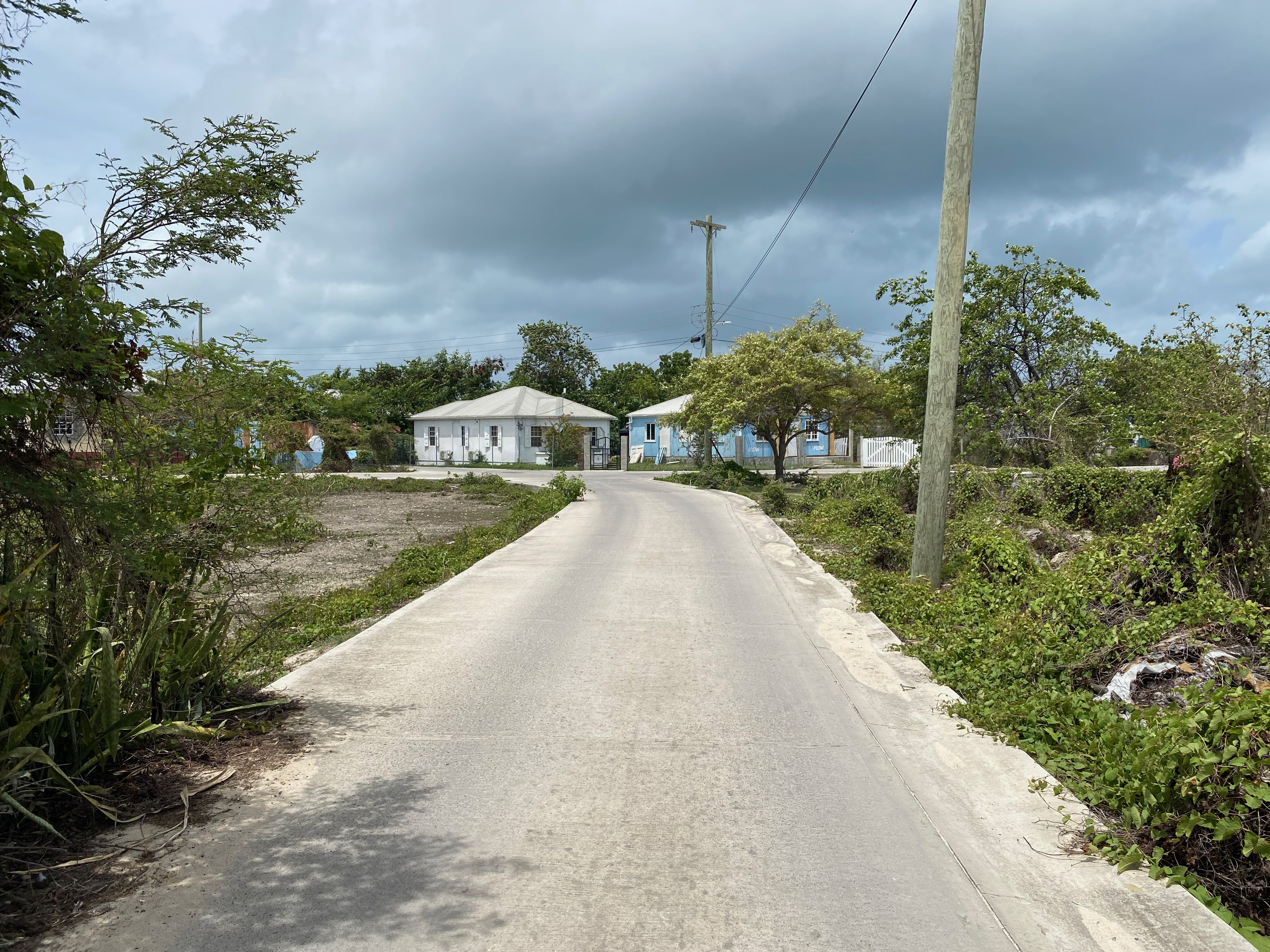
A street in the village in 2023

As Antigua and Barbuda negotiated its independence in the 1960s and 1970s, premier Vere Bird proposed allowing settlement outside of the village, experiencing a roadblock with his party's loss in the 1971 general election. When his party returned to government in 1976, he established a local government for the island, abolishing the island warden's position, leaving the Government House abandoned. The first election took place in January 1977. As Antigua and Barbuda moved towards independence, Barbudan voters repeatedly elected parties opposed to unification with Antigua. As a condition for granting the country independence, the Barbuda Council was granted increased autonomy. The country gained independence on 1 November 1981, although protests erupted in the village on 3 November with the majority of villagers signing a petition to separate Barbuda from the new country.

In January 2007, prime minister Baldwin Spencer visited the village. Spencer toured both the schools in the village and met with the council to discuss various issues. In April 2007, community consultations about the Barbuda Land Acts commenced, establishing the modern system of land management on the island. In May 2007 there was a crime wave with an attempted bank robbery and a burglary at the secondary school. In February 2011 an interpretation centre opened in the village for the Codrington Lagoon National Park. Road surfacing works took place in July 2011, especially in the Middle Section area. In August 2011 the Barbuda Fisheries Complex opened along the lagoon's shores which continues to be one of the tallest and largest buildings on the island. In January 2012 a Chinese-funded community centre opened in the Spring View area in the village's south. In March 2015, prime minister Gaston Browne visited Codrington to attend a controversial village meeting which resulted in a disputed vote in favour of the Paradise Found development. In September 2016 reports surfaced that some students in the local school system were being taught outside, prompting intervention by the Ministry of Education. In November 2016, Prince Harry visited both schools in the village.

On 6 September 2017, Codrington was directly hit by category 5 Hurricane Irma. 95% of buildings on the island were destroyed and the entire population was evacuated to Antigua following fears of a potential second hit by Hurricane Jose. A small minority of villagers began to return in October 2017 to begin the reconstrction process. In Codrington, the police station, the hospital, and the post office all had access to water and electricity by April 2018; nevertheless, many of the island's few residents were still residing in tents, and numerous government structures were still undergoing repairs. An estimated 75% of inhabitants had returned to Barbuda by February 2019 and as of 2025 the population of the island is higher than it was before the hurricane. In October 2024 the Barbuda Codrington Airport closed to make way for the Burton–Nibbs International Airport. Codrington is currently represented in parliament by Trevor Walker.

== Geography ==
A palm and sunset near the former airport, 2026

According to the Barbuda Act, Codrington's northern boundary is a wall that divides the settlement from Sedge Garden. On the south by a line that runs along to the old settlement's south wall, starting at the southernmost point of the eastern boundary and continuing until it reaches the lagoon. By a wall that separated it from Indigo Piece to the east, and by a line that ran 700 yards south from the southernmost point of that wall. To the west, by the lagoon.

=== Climate ===
Codrington exhibits a tropical climate marked by well-defined wet and dry seasons. Typically, winters experience lower precipitation levels compared to the more rainfall-intensive summers. Köppen and Geiger's climate classification categorizes Codrington as Aw. Codrington maintains an average temperature of 26.2 °C (79.2 °F), while annual rainfall accumulates to 899 mm (35.4 in).

Climate data for Codrington, Barbuda
Month	Jan	Feb	Mar	Apr	May	Jun	Jul	Aug	Sep	Oct	Nov	Dec	Year
Mean daily maximum °C (°F)	25.8 (78.4)	25.7 (78.3)	26.1 (79.0)	26.7 (80.1)	27.4 (81.3)	28.1 (82.6)	28.4 (83.1)	28.6 (83.5)	28.6 (83.5)	28.1 (82.6)	27.3 (81.1)	26.5 (79.7)	27.3 (81.1)
Mean daily minimum °C (°F)	24.2 (75.6)	23.9 (75.0)	24.0 (75.2)	24.5 (76.1)	25.3 (77.5)	26.0 (78.8)	26.2 (79.2)	26.4 (79.5)	26.4 (79.5)	26.0 (78.8)	25.5 (77.9)	24.8 (76.6)	25.3 (77.5)
Average precipitation mm (inches)	37 (1.5)	30 (1.2)	29 (1.1)	47 (1.9)	71 (2.8)	56 (2.2)	79 (3.1)	98 (3.9)	130 (5.1)	154 (6.1)	106 (4.2)	62 (2.4)	899 (35.5)
Average precipitation days	10	9	7	9	12	10	13	14	14	14	13	11	136
Average relative humidity (%)	75	73	72	75	78	77	78	79	79	80	78	75	77
Mean monthly sunshine hours	8.4	8.6	8.9	9.5	9.6	9.6	9.4	9.3	9.0	8.6	8.4	8.2	107.5

== Neighbourhoods ==
Map of the communities within Codrington and the surrounding area

Codrington has three enumeration districts, Codrington-North, Codrington-Central, and Codrington-South Airport. Broady, Guava Farm, Indigo North, Indigo South, Jeffrey Wood, Meadow East, Meadow West, Middle Section, Mulatto North, Mulatto South, Park (also known as Bell Village), Spring View, and the White Ponds East and White Ponds West on River Road at the edge of the village are some of the settlements in Codrington.

=== Major neighbourhoods ===
Indigo comprises two communities, Indigo North, and Indigo South. Indigo borders Mulatto North, Mulatto South, Middle Section, Park, Meadow East, Meadow West, Louis Hill, and Jeffrey Wood. Indigo is home to Barbuda's secondary school. The secondary school is also used as a voting station.

Meadow comprises two communities, Meadow East, and Meadow West. Meadow borders Spring View, Park, White Ponds East, Broady, Indigo South, and Louis Hill. Meadow also completely surrounds the Guava Farm section. Meadow was home to large plantations during the period of 1750–1800.

The junction of Middle Section and Mulatto South forms the village's center. Holy Trinity School, the Fisheries Complex, the Tennis Court, the Administration Building, the Environment Department, and numerous other shops and organizations are located within the communities.

=== Enumeration districts ===
==== Codrington-North ====
Codrington-North has 256 people. 90.84% of Codrington-North residents were born in Antigua and Barbuda. Most other subgroups hover at a population of a few people. The largest minority subgroups in Codrington-North are Guyanese people and Jamaicans, both making up 1.99% of the population respectively. The largest religious denomination in Codrington-North is Anglicanism, making up 25.10% of the population, followed by Wesleyan Holiness' who make up 24.70% of the population. The largest ethnic group in Codrington-North is Afro-Barbudans, who make up 99.20% of the population. 0.40% of the population is Mixed Black/White, and another 0.40% of the population didn't know or didn't state their ethnic group. This makes virtually all of the population of Codrington-North Afro-Barbudan or Mixed Afro-Barbudan.

Codrington-North has a living condition index of 13.72, exactly the same as the Fiennes Street enumeration district in St. John's. Codrington-North has an income weight of 1.89, making it an upper low income area, exactly the same as the income weight of Liberta (West) in Saint Paul.

Unmet basic needs in Codrington-North include 16.33% of people having an unmet basic need for housing, 7.97% having an unmet basic need for sanitation, 2.39% for fuel, 2.39% for light, 0.80% for information, 29.08% of people have one or more unmet basic needs, and 0.80% of people have two or more unmet basic needs.

==== Codrington-Central ====
Codrington-Central has 272 people. Codrington-Central is the most diverse area in Codrington, with 83.52% of the population being African descendant, 11.24% mixed black/white, 3.37% other mixed, 0.37% white, 0.37% Syrian/Lebanese, 0.37% other, and 0.75% Hispanic. 81.65% of residents were born in Antigua and Barbuda. The largest minority group in Codrington-Central is Guyanese, making up 5.62% of the population. The largest religious denomination in Codrington-Central is Wesleyan Holiness, making up 24.81% of the population. 3.76% of the population is Rastafarian.

Codrington-Central has a living condition index of 13.6, slightly higher than Willikies-East in Saint Philip. Codrington-Central has an income weight of 1.88, making it an upper low income area, exactly the same as Barnes Hill (East), Carlisle, and Wapping Lane (South) in Antigua.

Unmet basic needs in Codrington-Central include 17.98% of people having an unmet basic need for housing, 2.25% for sanitation, 2.62% for fuel, 0.37% for light, 3.00% for information, 22.47% of people having one or more UBN, 3.37% of people having two or more UBNs, and 0.37% of people having three or more UBNs.

==== Codrington-South Airport ====
Codrington-South Airport contains the word "Airport" in its name due to the Barbuda Codrington Airport being located in/near the enumeration district. Codrington-South has 268 people. 92.78% of residents were born in Antigua and Barbuda, with the largest minority immigrant group being those born in the Commonwealth of Dominica, who make up 1.90% of the population. 96.96% of the population is African descendant, 2.28% of the population is Mixed Black/White, 0.38% of the population is other mixed, and 0.38% of the population is Syrian/Lebanese. The largest religious denomination is Pentecostal, which make up 28.90% of the population. 8.75% of the population have no religion, and 1.52% of the population is Rastafarian.

Codrington-South has a living condition index of 15.14, the highest in Codrington, with the living condition index being exactly the same as Bathlodge in Antigua. While Codrington-South does have the highest living condition index in Codrington, Codrington-South is by far the lowest income only having an income weight of 1.60, similar to Green Hill and Clare Hall West in Antigua.

Unmet basic needs in Codrington-Central include 11.41% of people having an unmet basic need for housing, 3.42% for sanitation, 1.52% for fuel, 1.90% for light, 1.52% for refuse collection, 1.14% for information, 16.35% have one or more UBNs, 3.80% have two or more UBNs, and 0.76% have three or more UBNs.

== Demographics ==
The town's unemployment rate is 6.58 percent, and the Living Condition Index (a measure of unmet basic requirements) is 14.05. The town is categorized as "Urban" by the Antigua & Barbuda Statistics Department.

There are three enumeration districts.

- Codrington (North) (ED 90100)
- Codrington (Central) (ED 90200)
- Codrington (South) (ED 90300)

796 people were living in Codrington as of the 2011 census. Residents of Codrington are predominantly Black, Mixed, Hispanic, Syrian/Lebanese, and white, with 93.09% having African ancestry, 4.74% having Mixed Black/White heritage, 1.28% having other mixed heritage. 88.35% of the people who live in Codrington were born in Antigua and Barbuda. Those born in Guyana, who make up 2.69% of the population, are the second largest group. 1.54% of the population was born in the United States. 1.41% of people were born in the Commonwealth of Dominica. 1.15% of the people of Codrington were born in Jamaica. 1.15% of the population was born in the US Virgin Islands. Other groups make up less than 1% each of the population.

== Religion ==
With 22.44% of the population, Wesleyan Holiness is the most prevalent religious denomination in the village. 20.13% of the population is Anglican. The Pentecostal population is 20.00% of the total. There are 2.82% Rastafarians. 4.49% of people identify as not religious. Other Christian denominations and a tiny number of adherents of other faiths make up the majority of the remaining population.

There are 8 churches on Barbuda, all of them in Codrington, these churches are the Holy Trinity Anglican Church, the Pilgrim Holiness Church, the Living Faith Baptist Church, the Seventh Day Adventists, the Barbuda Pentecostal Church, the Hope Community Church, Abundant Life Ministries and The People's Church.

Holy Trinity Church is a parish in the Aruba Diocese in the Northeastern Caribbean. It is a member of the worldwide Anglican Communion. Being the first church constructed on the island during the slave trade, this chapel is well known among the Barbudan people. Barbuda received its early education from the Anglican Church, which also managed the Holy Trinity School until the government took possession in 1950. In 1982, Pastor James Punter established the Living Faith Baptist Church. On Sundays, there are two service times: 11:00 am and 7:30 pm. The church runs a year-round campground in Rock Bay, which is close to Two Foot Bay. The Barbuda Pentecostal Church is a part of the largest Evangelical movement in the Caribbean, the Pentecostal Assemblies of the West Indies. The Hope Community Church was once known as the Deeper Life Church. The minister of The People's Church is Bishop Moses John. The church holds Sunday school at 10:00 am, morning worship at 11:00 am, and evening worship at 7:00 pm on Sundays.

The only Christian radio station on Barbuda is The Abundant Life Radio. On 103.1 MHz and 103.9 MHz, the evangelist Clifton François, his wife Michal James-François, and numerous Barbudans broadcast daily.

== Economy ==
Most employees in Codrington fell into one of three categories, paid government employees, who make up 59.22% of workers, paid private employees, who make up 23.79% of workers, and self-employed without paid employees, who made up 8.98% of the population. The rest of the workers in Codrington mostly worked for statutory bodies, and self-employed with paid employees. For job status, most people (73.97%) had a job and worked, or are retired and do not work (9.14%).

Most workers in Codrington have a fixed place of work outside of the home (78.88%), 3.64% of workers work from home, and 16.99% of workers have no fixed place of work.

There are 43 business owners in Codrington. 30.95% of businesses make less than $1,000 Eastern Caribbean dollars per month, 7.14% of businesses make between $1,000 and $1,999 per month, 21.43% of businesses make between $2,000 and $2,999 per month, 19.05% of businesses make between $3,000 and $4,999 per month, and 21.43% of businesses make more than $5,000 per month.

There are 282 households in Codrington. 73.40% of households in Codrington use concrete blocks as the main material of outer walls, 8.16% use wood, 7.45% use concrete, 5.67% use wood and concrete, 4.26% use other materials such as improvised, stone, stone and brick walls, and 1.06% use wood and brick. 40.43% of households have one person, 18.09% have two people, 15.25% have three, 7.09% have four, 7.80% have five, 5.67% have six, 0.71% have seven, 2.13% have eight, and 2.84% of households have nine or more people. 91.49% of housing units have metal roofing, 6.03% of housing units have wood shingles, 1.77% have concrete roofing, 0.35% have asphalt shingles, and 0.35% have other materials such as improvised, tarpaulin, and tile. 61.35% of housing units are owned outright, 8.87% are rent free, 28.72% are rented private, 0.71% owned in another method such as leased, rented government, or squatted, and 0.35% of households do not know. 1.06% of households have a leasehold tenure, and 98.94% have a freehold tenure. This is due to the Barbuda Land Acts holding all land in common with the people of Barbuda, vested in the crown.

== Infrastructure ==
=== Government offices ===
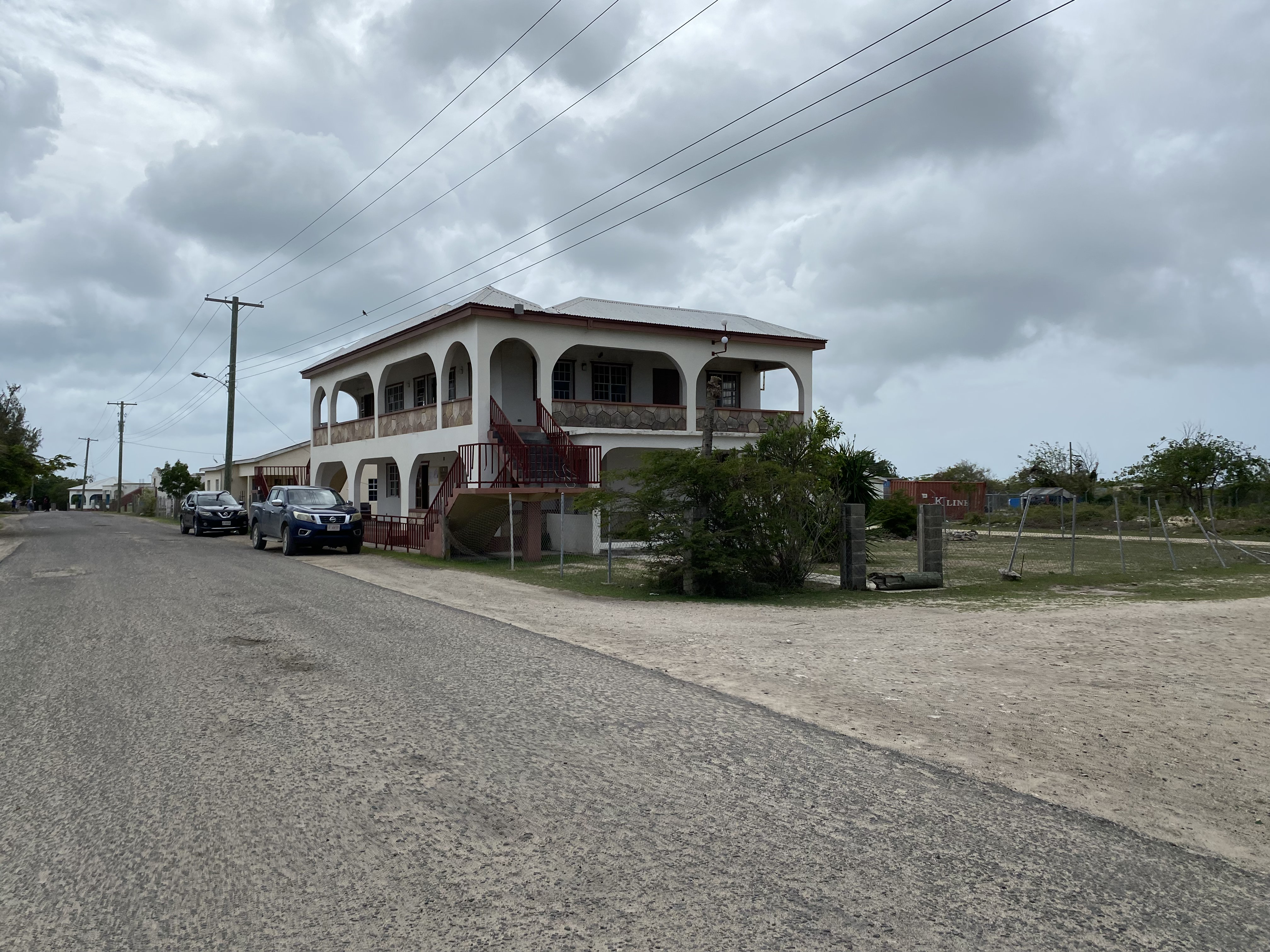
Barbuda Council Millennium Administration Building

After Hurricane Irma, the Council administration building is now fully functioning and serves as the headquarters for the Secretary of the Barbuda Council and a team of administrative staff. The Treasury, where bills and salaries are paid, is located right next door. The tourism building is open daily for visits and offers information about Barbuda and has "a large team of Council staff" working there. There are crafts and mementos for sale occasionally. After Hurricane Irma, the post office was repaired and is now open every day during regular hours for mail and stamp purchases.

The Barbudan fisheries complex was opened in August 2011. The complex also serves as the meeting place for the Barbuda Council.

=== Police, fire, and hospital services ===
In a rented and renovated house on Barbuda, a temporary police station has been established from funding from the Peace, Love, and Happiness organization after many years of neglect, the absence of any facilities for holding suspects, and "unsuitable" working conditions for police personnel.

Since Hurricane Irma, the Hanna Thomas Hospital has continuously received support from a variety of organizations, including the Indian government Aid Programme, PLH, Coco Point Trust, locals, and the Barbuda Council staff. It has been partially rebuilt and is currently equipped with wards for the majority of local emergencies, including a delivery room. It has an "experienced and qualified" pharmacist and a dedicated pharmacy with the majority of necessary medications on hand. Dr. Jeremy Deazle is the team's leader, and it includes a medical staff from Barbuda and doctors from Cuba.

Most illnesses can be treated at the hospital for "reasonable" costs, but serious situations must be airlifted to Antigua if a pilot is available. Otherwise, a boat from the coast guard is deployed. Barbuda also has a visiting dentist.

Barbuda has a fire brigade on duty at the airport for both emergency services and every plane landing.

== Education ==
27.33% of Codrington residents attend school full time, mostly children. 1.17% of Codrington residents attend school part-time. 71.50% of Codrington residents do not attend school. For those attending school, 55.91% of learners attend a government or government assisted primary school, 16.82% of learners attend a secondary school, 10.91% of learners attend a preschool, 5.00% of learners attend a daycare, 2.27% of learners attend a community/state college (inc. Sixth Form and Post Secondary), 2.73% of learners attend adult education, and 1.36% of learners attend a university. The remainder of learners participate in minority forms of education.

All residents of Codrington were asked what their current or highest level of education was. 5.12% of all Codrington residents had no education, including those too young to attend school, 2.18% had a daycare education, 2.69% had a preschool education, 2.43% had an infant or kindergarten education, 7.04% of residents had a primary/elementary (1–3) education, 9.22% of residents had a primary/elementary (4–7) education, 15.62% of residents had a junior secondary education, 12.93% of residents had a secondary (form 1–3) education, 21.51% of residents, the largest group, had a secondary (form 4–5) education, 0.38% of residents had a sixth form (A'Level) - lower education, 0.51% of residents had a sixth form (A'Level) - upper education, 1.28% of residents had a post-secondary education, 5.51% of residents had a post secondary/pre-university/college education, 0.64% of residents had a post primary - vocational/trade education, 0.38% of residents had a special school/special education. 2.05% of residents had a university education, 1.66% of residents had "other" education, and 8.83% of residents didn't know or didn't state their education.

64.02% of all residents had no examination, 3.33% of residents had a school leaving certificate, 2.05% of residents had a high school certificate, 6.02% of residents had a Cambridge School/CXC examination, 6.79% of residents had a GCE 'O' level/CXC General examination, 0.64% of residents had a GCE 'A' Levels, CAPE examination, 3.59% of residents had a college certificate, 1.92% of residents had an associate degree, 1.66% of residents had a bachelor's degree, 0.26% of residents had a Professional Certificate, 0.26% of residents had a Master's or Doctoral Degree, and 9.48% of residents didn't know or didn't state their examination.

=== Educational facilities ===
The Barbuda Council offers subsidized daycare for the infants and young children of Council employees. Additionally, there are private daycare centers in Codrington, albeit the majority are still closed following Hurricane Irma and the COVID-19 pandemic.

The Barbuda Council operates a preschool in Codrington that enjoys long-term financial support from the Coco Point Trust Fund as well as regular contributions from other sponsors. The council also maintains and staffs the preschool. Since Hurricane Irma, it has been almost entirely rebuilt and renovated, but it largely stayed closed before, during, and after Covid. The head teacher is Elaine Teague.

The first school established on Barbuda was the Holy Trinity Primary School. Two powerful hurricanes, Luis and Irma, completely destroyed it, but the Council rebuilt it. Charlene Harris is the principal.

The Sir McChesney George Secondary School is Barbuda's only secondary school.

== Culture ==
The Barbuda Caribana Festival takes place every year in May and features events including the Teenage Pageant, Caribana Queen Show, Calypso competitions, and weekend beach parties.

From an early age, students are encouraged to participate in sports in school. Two Barbuda Council employees have been designated to support sports in the local area.

The success of the Anguilla professional tennis program served as inspiration for the construction of the village tennis court, which is available to use 24 hours a day by anyone who wishes to play a game. The court has been utilized by school groups for CXC athletics tests, and in the past, Barbuda had a Tennis Association. Barbuda has consequently given rise to a few "strong" tennis players. After Hurricane Irma, the court's surface has been restored. For casual games, the court is still frequently utilized.

The floodlit basketball court is where the Vipers, Young Warriors, Rockers, Flip-mo, Boars, and Vikings teams compete in a league table structure, with the top teams moving on to the playoffs. The basketball season on Barbuda typically begins in August.
