= Warden of Barbuda =

Head of government of Barbuda (1904–1976)

The warden of Barbuda was the primary government official on the island from 1904 to 1976 with the passing of the Barbuda Ordinance (now entitled the Barbuda Act). The warden was appointed by the colonial government, and later by the associated state's government. The warden had the authority to levy taxes, divide lands within the village, manage public resources and highways, and many other local governance tasks now exercised by its successors: the Barbuda Council and its chairperson. The warden resided at the Government House in Codrington.

The position was created after the failure of two business ventures that were primarily intended to turn the island into an agricultural powerhouse. The warden was supposed to run the island in the fashion of an estate rather than like a colony. While the Antigua Labour Party government which consolidated power starting in the 1950s initially tolerated the office, the party's stance eventually became one of discontent, viewing it as a remnant of colonialism. The office was eventually abolished by the Barbuda Local Government Act in 1976.
