= 6th legislature of Antigua and Barbuda =

Parliament of Antigua and Barbuda (1976–1980)

The 6th legislature of Antigua and Barbuda was elected on Wednesday, 18 February 1976, and dissolved on Saturday, 5 April 1980.

== Members ==
=== Senate ===
Unknown

=== House of Representatives ===
Speaker: Casford Murray

Party	Representative	Constituency
PLM	Donald Halstead	St. John's City West
ALP	John St. Luce	St. John's City East
ALP	Christopher O'Mard	St. John's City South
ALP	Donald Christian	St. John's Rural West
ALP	Vere Bird Jr.	St. John's Rural South
ALP	Lester Bird	St. John's Rural East
ALP	Vere Bird Sr. Premier	St. John's Rural North
PLM	Robert Hall	St. Mary's North
PLM	Victor McKay	St. Mary's South
PLM	Charlesworth Samuel	St. Lukes
PLM	George Walter	All Saints
ALP	Adolphus Freeland	St. George
ALP	Joseph Myers	St. Peter
ALP	Robin Yearwood	St. Phillip North
ALP	Reuben Henry Harris	St. Phillip South
ALP	Ernest Williams	St. Paul
IND	Claude-Earl Francis	Barbuda
