= Barbuda Local Government Act =

6th legislature of Antigua and Barbuda
- Commenced: 23 December 1976
- Status: In force

The Barbuda Local Government Act (c. 44) is an Act of the Parliament of Antigua and Barbuda which legislated for the establishment of the Barbuda Council. The Act is enshrined under section 123 of the Constitution and can only be amended by Parliament with the consent of the Council.

== Contents and history ==
The Act establishes the Barbuda Council, establishes the procedure on how members of the Barbuda Council are elected, and sets out the procedure on how the Council can create by-laws for the island. The Act also establishes the legislative competence of the Barbuda Council, listing what topics the Council is permitted to make by-laws for.

The Act also establishes that the national Cabinet may give direction to the Council, and establishes the duties of the Council that are subjected to the guidance of the Cabinet. The Act additionally establishes that all monies owed to the Council must be paid to the Secretary, and that all payments by the Council shall only be made with the countersignature of the Council's chairperson.

The Act has been an important discussion point during the Barbuda crisis, and members of the Barbuda People's Movement have often cited the Act when advocating for the preservation of the Barbudan communal land system.

== Relation to section 123 of the Constitution ==
In section 123 of the Constitution of 1981, it is stated that "There shall be a Council for Barbuda which shall be the principal organ of local government in that island" and "The Council shall have such membership and functions as Parliament may prescribe". In subsection 3, it is stated that House of Representatives may not pass a bill amending the Barbuda Local Government Act without the consent of the Council through a resolution. The Senate also may not change a bill passed by the House amending the Act without the Council signifying to the Clerk of the House of Representatives that the Council consents to the amendment. A bill amending the Act may also not be submitted to the Governor-General without a certificate from the Speaker of the House.

== See also ==
- Local government in Antigua and Barbuda
- Village councils (Antigua and Barbuda)
- Law of Barbuda
