= The Ginnery =

Official historic site of Antigua and Barbuda

- The building in 2026

- Location within Antigua and Barbuda
- 17°38′30″N 61°49′38″W
- Location: Codrington, Barbuda

National Cultural Heritage of Antigua and Barbuda

The Ginnery is a historic site in Codrington, Barbuda used to store salt and cotton from before emancipation to the early 1900s. The building has since been used as a classroom and a meeting hall for the Barbuda Council before losing its roof during Hurricane Irma in 2017. As of 2025, it has yet to be repaired.
