= Law of Barbuda =

Barbuda is an autonomous island and dependency within the country of Antigua and Barbuda. The Barbuda Council is the main local government authority on the island, and has the authority to make by-laws. Various other agencies have the authority to make statutory instruments, and Parliament can also make laws affecting the island.

== Statutory instruments ==
=== 1997 ===
==== Barbuda (Codrington Lagoon Magnificent Frigate Bird Sanctuary) ====
The Barbudan frigate bird sanctuary is a popular tourist destination located in Barbuda. Visitors are required to pay a fee of EC$2.00 if they are citizens and US$2.00 if they are non-citizens to the Barbuda Council upon entry. This fee is used to support the maintenance and conservation efforts of the sanctuary.

=== 2010 ===
==== Barbuda Land Regulations ====
The Barbuda Land Regulations constitute a legal document that delineates the requisites for obtaining recognition as a Barbudan, a necessary qualification for participation in the island's distinctive land system. According to the stipulations of the act, a Barbudan is defined as an individual who was born in Barbuda and has at least one grandparent who shares the same birthplace. Furthermore, the act extends recognition to children born to at least one Barbudan parent, irrespective of the place of birth. These criteria are explicitly detailed within the relevant section of the act.

In addition, the regulations encompass clauses pertaining to the export of timber and the licensing of coal burning. Precisely, the regulations prohibit the export of Barbudan timber and mandate that individuals or entities engaged in timber harvesting acquire a Barbudan timber license. Furthermore, those involved in coal burning are obligated to secure a coal burning license, as outlined by the regulations.

=== 2014 ===
==== Barbuda (Coastal Zoning and Management) Regulations ====
These regulations comprise a set of guidelines that establish the maritime boundaries of the region and delineate diverse marine geographical features around Barbuda. These regulations also aim to protect these features and ensure their preservation for future generations.

==== Barbuda (Fisheries) Regulations ====
The Barbuda Coastal Management Advisory Committee and the Barbuda Senior Fisheries Officer were established by this law. These positions are appointed by the Barbuda Council, with the exception of one member of the committee who is appointed by the Defence Force and serves as a coast guard officer.

==== Barbuda (National Parks Authority) Establishment Regulations ====
The Barbuda (National Parks Authority) Establishment Regulations is a legal document that outlines the framework for the establishment of a parks authority in Barbuda.

== By-laws ==
These are the notable by-laws of Barbuda.

=== Barbuda Cutting of Wood Prohibition By-Law ===
According to regulations set forth by the council, it is prohibited to cut, take away, or collect any wattle, sedge, or broom-straw without prior permission. A penalty of $50 is imposed in case of a violation.

=== Barbuda Bell Village By-Law ===
The term "Bell Village" refers to the Park community, where lands have been allocated to individuals or groups. This process of land allocation is commonly known as allotment.
