= Local government in Antigua and Barbuda =

Administrative structures for local governments can be found in Antigua and Barbuda. Antigua and Barbuda had seventeen district councils corresponding with the constituencies. Under the direction of the Local Government Officer, the district councils have been categorized into a total of four distinct zones. At a more fundamental level, village councils are encouraged the participation of local citizens. The island of Barbuda has a constitutionally-protected unique status, and it has given the authority to solicit financial contributions in order to meet the needs of its inhabitants.

The Barbuda Council is the only functioning local government institution in the country. The St. John's Development Corporation has some characteristics of a local government but mostly only serves the Downtown St. John's area, rather than the whole city. Many services once provided by local governments in Antigua are now directly provided by the Government of Antigua and Barbuda or by special districts.

The Local Government Department had existed in Antigua and Barbuda until 2023 when it was absorbed into the Community Development Division.

== Barbuda ==
There is an active and functioning Barbuda Council, which has authority over the island of Barbuda. It is an elected body enshrined in the Constitution.

== Parishes ==
There has not been any form of parish government in Antigua and Barbuda since the parish vestry system became defunct after its establishment in the late 1600s. The parishes do, however, have some restricted powers, such as the issuing of papers. Antigua is administratively divided into parishes, which are also known as civil parishes.

=== 2023 Asot Michael proposal ===
Asot Michael claimed in his manifesto that one of his first priorities as MP for Saint Peter would be to establish a "modern" system of parish councils within the first sixty days of his election. In his manifesto, he proposed that parish councils receive their money from property taxes. This was one of his proposals. Michael also proposed the establishment of a Saint Peter Parish Council; however, the geographic boundaries of this particular parish are unknown. This is because Long Island is sometimes considered to be part of both Saint George and Saint Peter, and the boundaries of the St. Peter Constituency are distinct from those of the Saint Peter Parish. As an independent candidate, Michael was successful in winning the election for his seat.

=== 2023 Democratic National Alliance proposal ===
The Democratic National Alliance campaigned on the promise that it will repeal the "Local Government Act" and replace existing municipal governments with a network of parish councils. The minority political group is working toward the goal of constructing a Council Administrative Headquarters and taking powers away from the central government. In the event that they did win the election, they planned to establish Parish Councils in each parish, with the exception of Saint John Parish, which contains the majority of the country's population. Saint John Parish would instead be transformed into a municipality and would be led by a Mayor in this scenario. In the 16th parliament, the DNA was not successful in gaining any seats.

== Zones ==
Under the former local government system on Antigua, there were four zones. While these zones had no local government purpose, they were under the supervision of the Local Government Officer.

== District councils ==
Antigua and Barbuda had 17 inactive district councils which correspond to the borders of parliamentary constituencies. District councils were composed of at least five members, and among those members, a chairman and secretary/treasurer were elected. The member of parliament who represents that constituency automatically had a seat in the committee as an ex-officio member. The responsibility for providing service to three (3) councils was shared between one officer of the local government and the assistant.

== Village councils ==
Village councils in Antigua and Barbuda were local government bodies responsible for the administration of the villages on the Island of Antigua. Village councils were responsible for the delivery of public services, such as waste management, road maintenance, and community development projects, to the residents of the village. Village councils were also responsible for collecting taxes and fees from residents, as well as for creating and enforcing local by-laws and regulations. The members of the village councils were elected by the residents of the village, and they served a specified term of office. The village councils worked in collaboration with the national government of Antigua and Barbuda to ensure the effective delivery of services to the communities they serve.

Thirteen councils were established in 1946 and 1947.

A system of village councils was created by the Village Councils Act (1945). While all village councils are inactive, the legislation has never been repealed.

== Local government in St. John's ==
St. John's once had a city council from 1898 to the 1910s, which had major reforms in 1907 and had the authority to make by-laws. The idea of a city board was first seriously proposed in 1897. In the downtown area, the St. John's Development Corporation has assumed many local government responsibilities and has control over some utilities and various city services and lands.

== See also ==
- Law of Barbuda
