= Government House, Codrington =

Official historic site of Antigua and Barbuda

Government House
- The building in 2026

- Location within Antigua and Barbuda
- 17°38′27″N 61°49′33″W
- Location: Codrington, Barbuda

History
- Built: 1694

Historical Site of Antigua and Barbuda

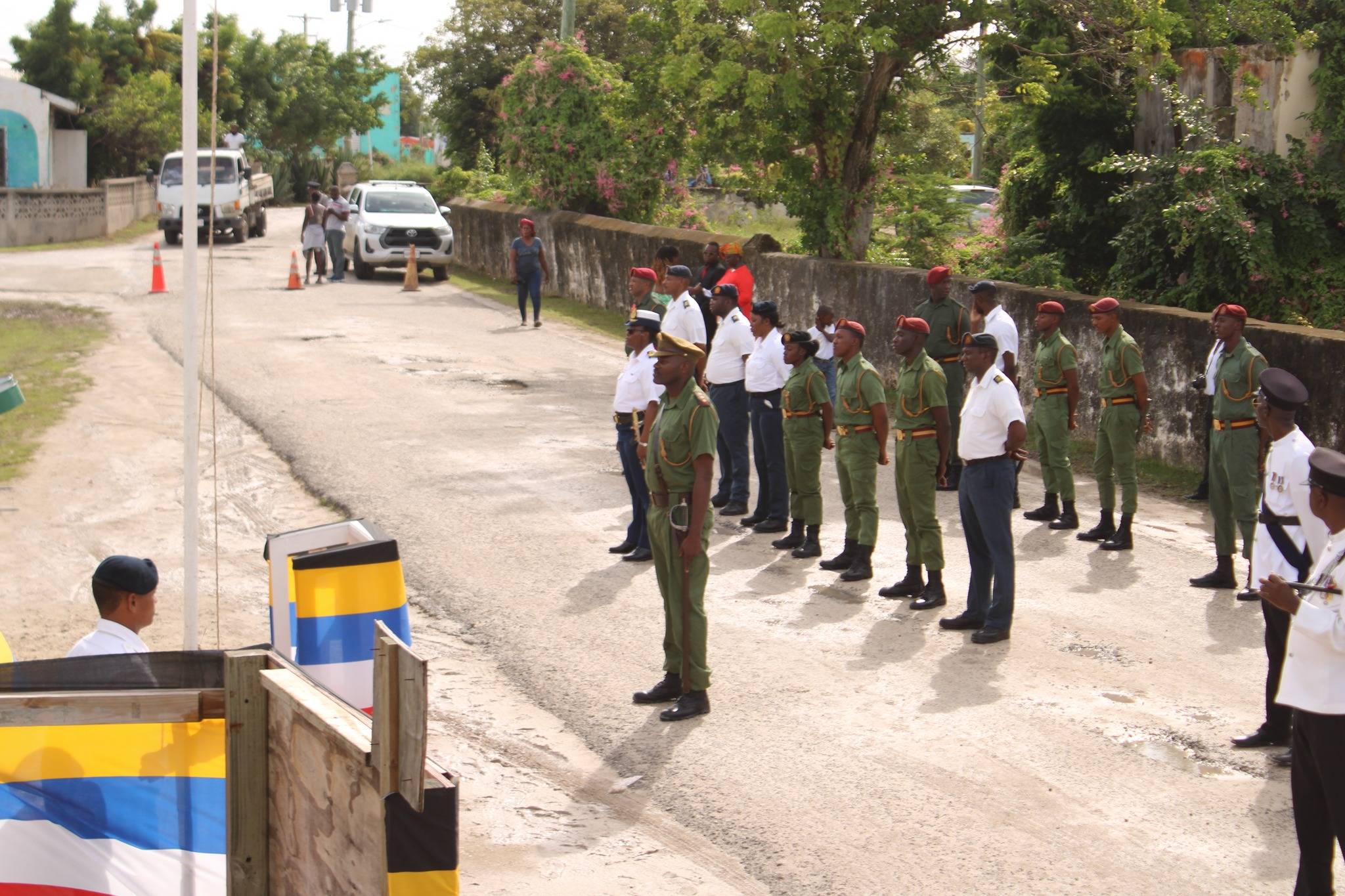
A military parade in front of the building

Government House is a building in central Codrington, Barbuda dating to 1694. The house was inhabited by the island wardens who represented the British government on the island until 1976. The building has since been left dilapidated due to various hurricanes. The building is a large mansion surrounded by an old stone wall. The yard is often used as a mass dumping site for litter.
