= Codrington Lagoon =

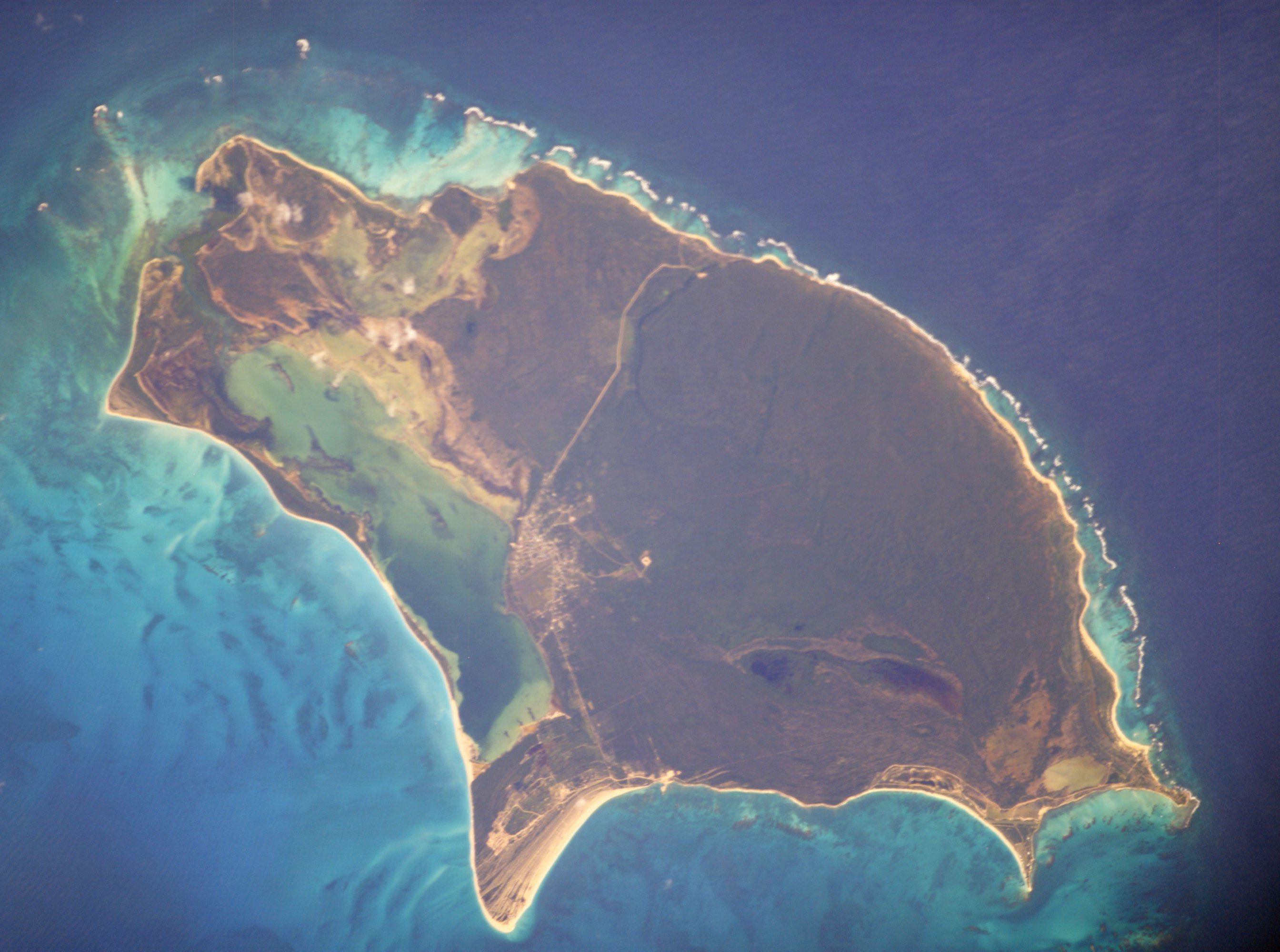
- Codrington Lagoon on the west of Barbuda

- Location within Antigua and Barbuda
- Location: Barbuda, Antigua and Barbuda
- Coordinates: 17°39′N 61°50′W
- Type: lagoon
- Surface area: 3,600 hectares (8,900 acres)
- Settlements: Codrington

Ramsar Wetland
- Official name: Codrington Lagoon
- Designated: 2 June 2005
- Reference no.: 1488

Codrington Lagoon is a lagoon and national park on the west coast of Barbuda. It is the largest saltwater lagoon in the Eastern Caribbean. The lagoon is home to the largest magnificent frigatebird colony in the world. The village of Codrington, the main settlement on Barbuda, is located on the eastern shore of the lagoon.

== Description ==
Codrington Lagoon measures 9 km long and 2.5 km wide, covering 3,600 hectares and taking up a large portion of the island. Its water is shallow (between 1–4.5 m deep), and much of the shore of the northern half of the lagoon is marshland.

The lagoon is separated from the Caribbean Sea by 140–260 m wide natural barrier, approximately 1–3 m in height. The barrier is made of coral, mollusks, algae, and foraminifers. Three small channels provide access to the lagoon from the sea.

== History ==
Codrington Lagoon developed in the mid- to late-Holocene era.

In 1960, a hurricane breached the southwest corner of the lagoon, temporarily opening a small passage to Caribbean Sea. This breach, known as "The Canal", lasted approximately four months, and was used as an entrance for sloops coming from Antigua.

In 2005, Codrington Lagoon was designated a Ramsar Site, as a wetland of international importance.

Prior to 2017, the lagoon's connection to the Caribbean Sea was a small channel at the northern tip of the lagoon, called Cuffy Creek (locally "The Creek"). In 2017, Hurricane Irma destroyed a portion of the western edge of the lagoon and two inlets developed, providing additional access to the lagoon from the sea.

== Frigatebird colony ==
To the north of the lagoon is a magnificent frigatebird (Fregata magnificens) colony, on the tiny Man of War Island. The colony, known as the Frigate Bird Sanctuary, is one of the main ecotourism attractions in Barbuda. The colony is the largest in the world, and is a Ramsar site.

During the mating season (from September through March or April), the male bird displays a large, scarlet red throat pouch to attract a female mate. The pair will lay one egg on a nest built on the mangroves of Man of War island. These birds do not walk or swim. They live solely on fish, which they often steal from other birds, giving them their local name, Man of war. They have few predators in the lagoon, making this nesting site one of the most important in the world for the endangered species.

The colony had an estimated 2,500—5,000 nesting pairs prior to Hurricane Irma landfall in September 2017. The lagoon was hit by Hurricane Irma's storm surge, and although there was a temporary decline in magnificent frigatebird numbers, the population survived.
