= Secretary of the Barbuda Council =

Head of government of Barbuda

- Incumbent; Shari Cannegieter
- Reports to: the Barbuda Council
- Appointer: the Barbuda Council

The Secretary is the chief executive officer of the Barbuda Council and head of government of Barbuda. The current secretary is Shari Cannegieter.

== Role ==
The Secretary is appointed by the Barbuda Council. The Secretary solely reports to the Barbuda Council.

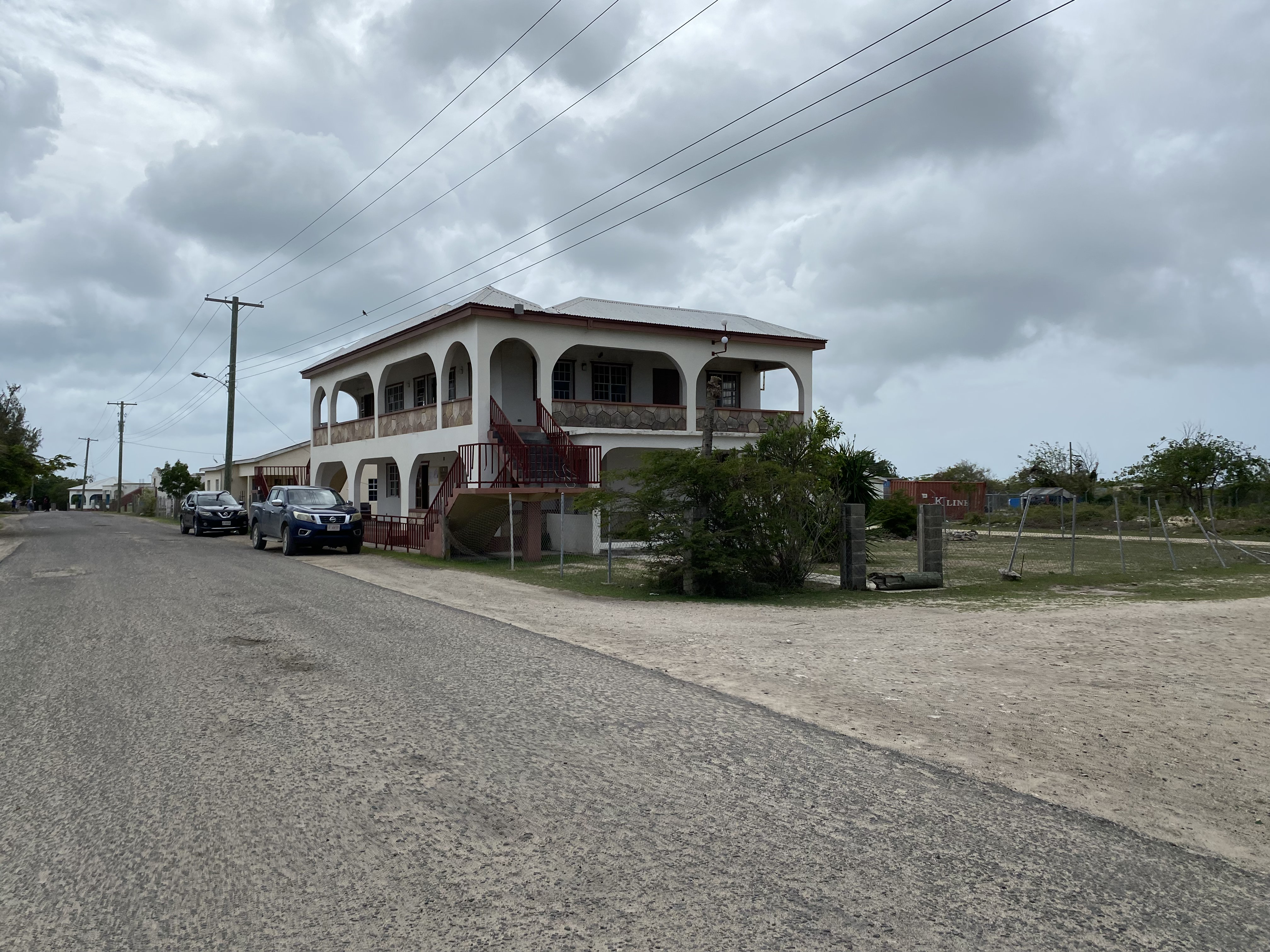
Barbuda Council Millenium Administration Building is the base for the Secretary of the council. It is located in Codrington.

In carrying out their responsibilities as such, the Secretary, who serves as the council's Chief Executive Officer, is answerable to the council. They have all the authority and carry out all the responsibilities that may be granted or imposed upon them by the Barbuda Local Government Act, any other legislation, or any Barbuda Council bylaw.

The Secretary is responsible for–

- keeping a vote book in which all revenues and payments must be recorded in line with the entries made in the council's deposit account;
- assemble and deliver to the Minister–
  - the Council-approved annual revenue and expense projections; and
  - any request to modify those projections made in accordance with section 25(3) of the Barbuda Local Government Act;
- make the required preparations for the council's and its committees' meetings;
- keeping minutes at all Council meetings and meetings of its committees, attending all Council meetings.
