= Barbuda Land Acts =

The Barbuda Land Acts establish that the citizens of Barbuda communally own the land. The act specifies that residents must provide consent for major development projects on the island. The Government of Antigua and Barbuda passed the act on January 17, 2008.

In 2016, the act was altered to increase the standard price of a major development required for an island-wide vote. Gaston Browne, the current prime minister of Antigua and Barbuda, has expressed interest in transitioning to a privatized land system in the midst of the larger Barbuda crisis.

== Details of the Act ==
=== 2007 Act ===
The act states that all people in Barbuda own the land collectively. Any citizen over 18 years old has the right to occupy residential land, graze animals and use land for commercial purposes, as long as projects are not considered major developments. Major developments, in this act, are defined as anything that costs over $5.4 million and will affect the island in a major way, through the economy, infrastructure or environment. The act also gives citizens the ability to voice their support or discontent for development on the island. The majority of citizens must support a major development project in order for a land lease to be granted. The governing Council and Cabinet must approve development projects as well. The Government of Antigua and Barbuda passed the act on January 17, 2008.

=== 2016 Act ===
In 2016, the Government of Antigua and Barbuda amended the 2007 act in order to change the value of major developments from $5.4 million to $40 million. Moving forward, development projects worth less than $40 million are not subject to a vote from residents.

== Communal land history ==
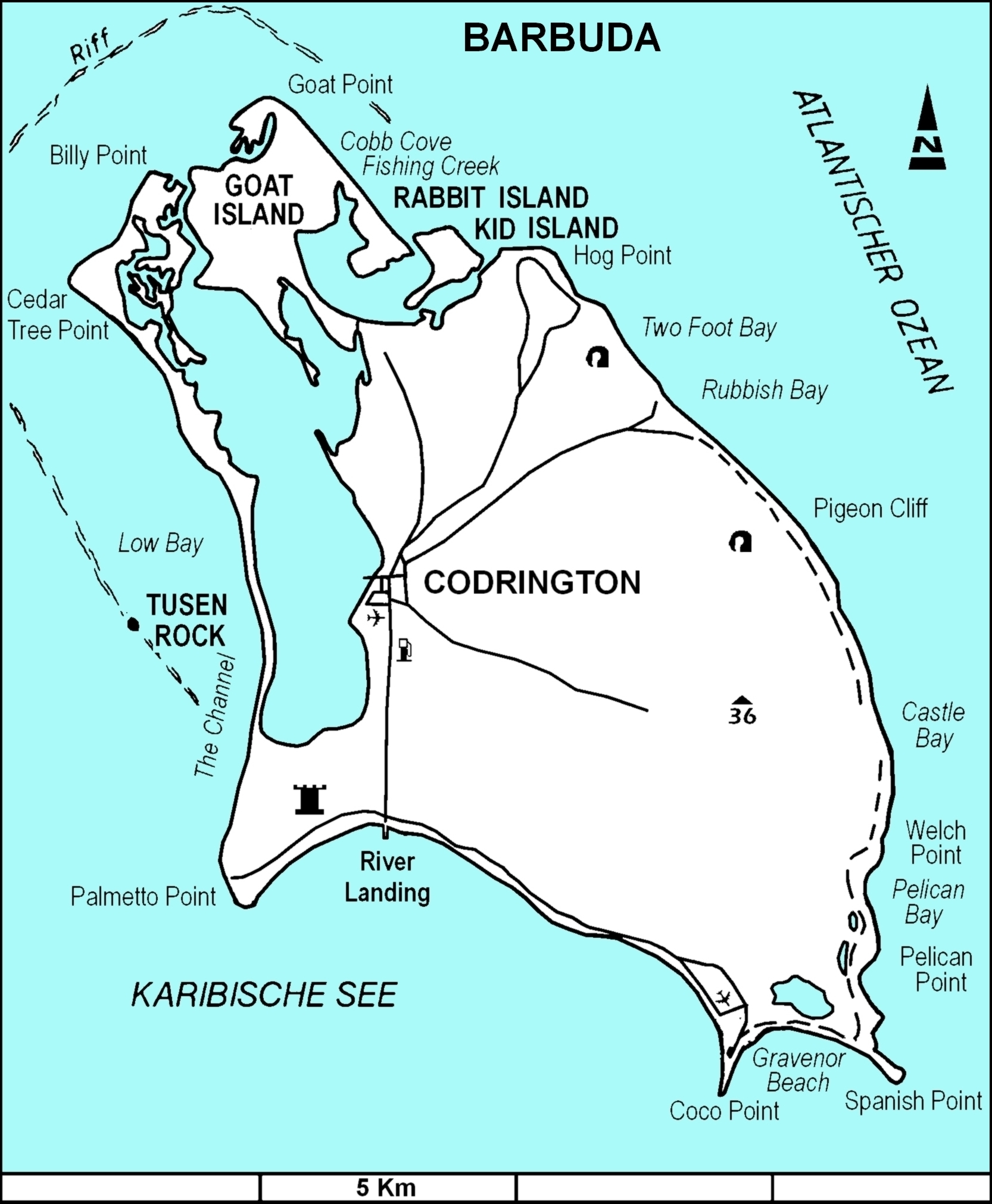
Map of Barbuda.

Since the period of British rule, the community-driven relationship with the land has been maintained through a communal land tenure system. In 1685, the Crown leased the island to Christopher Codrington. This lease lasted until 1898. The largest town on the island is named after Codrington.

During the Codrington family's lease, cattle was bred and traded for use at sugar plantations in Antigua and other nearby Caribbean islands. The Royal Navy also purchased cattle for consumption. Traditional, open cattle grazing methods fared better than the enclosed, private pastoral methods typically used by colonial regimes. The Codringtons attempted to transform Barbuda into a large-scale agricultural and plantation economy, but the island's dry weather patterns made this very difficult.

In letters from Codrington's assistants who monitored the island, they indicated that the citizens of Barbuda felt the land was their own. One such letter is from a man named R. Jarrit. In 1820, he wrote to the Codringtons that the people "acknowledged no master, and believe the island belongs to themselves".

In 1904, Parliament granted Barbudans with crown tenant status. Many people in Barbuda think that this signifies they have communal ownership. In 1969, Barbuda reached statehood and some occupants recognized themselves as co-owners of the land. Barbudan citizens continued to see the land as their own, even as the islands of Antigua and Barbuda integrated into one nation in 1981. But in that same year, an act was passed in Parliament that transferred any crown land into the ownership of the Antiguan and Barbudan government.

Residents are shifting away from communal agricultural methods. There is decreasing demand for Barbudan beef, as Antigua (its main export market) imports greater amounts of foreign beef instead. Barbudan citizens are consuming more foreign beef as well. There is also stigma in choosing herding as an occupation, as younger generations are looking for more profitable opportunities off the island. Declines in rainfall in the past 100 years also make it more difficult for livestock to travel freely and drink from outside water sources.

== Recent developments ==
=== Robert De Niro and James Packer ===
In 2015, actor Robert De Niro and billionaire James Packer purchased a resort on the island. The duo will renovate the former K Club resort for a projected US$250 million. Residents voted on the proposed venture in March, 2015. 206 people voted in favour of the project, outscoring the 175 who contested the development. According to the Antigua Observer, some voters did not think the voting process was fair because there was no system in place to ensure all voters were citizens and that people only voted once. They also claimed the vote was not anonymous.

Before the vote, the government chairman of the event expressed his support for foreign investment to voters. He spoke about potential jobs opportunities the resort would bring to the area. While there was some discontent in the crowd, the room after the vote was filled with loud cheers of approval.

The current Prime Minister of Antigua and Barbuda, Gaston Browne, is a large advocate for external development projects, believing that a strong, developed economy is beneficial to residents.

=== Hurricane Irma ===
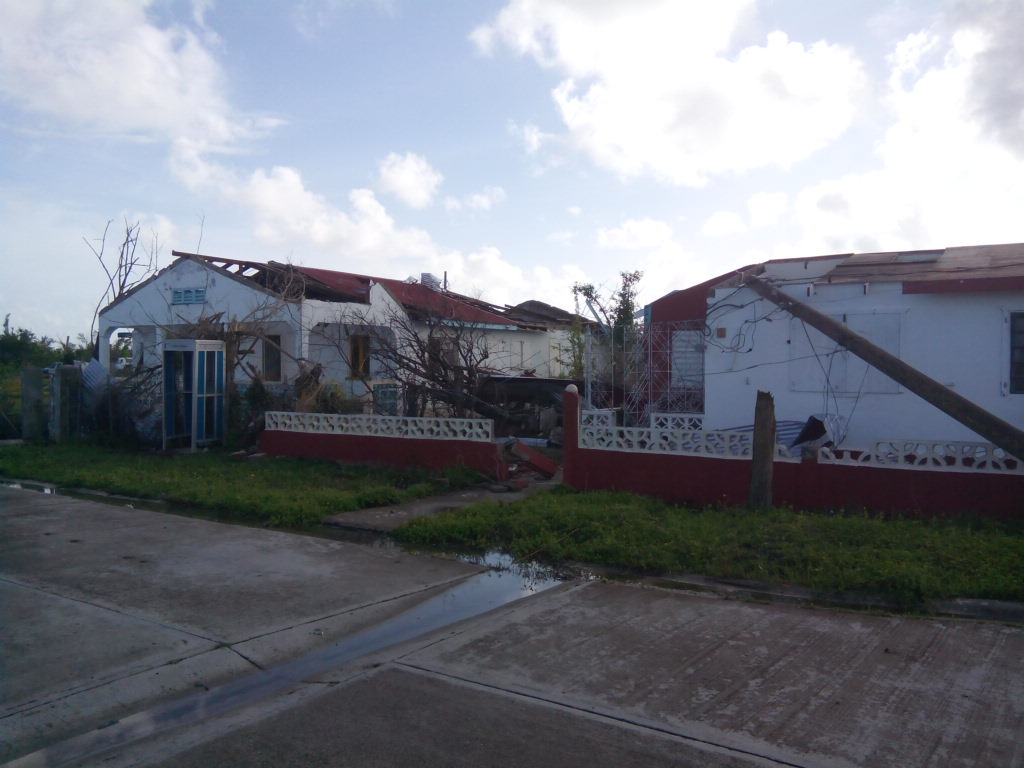
The aftermath of Hurricane Irma in Barbuda.

In 2017, Hurricane Irma destroyed 90 percent of the island and left a majority of the island's population homeless and exiled in nearby Antigua. The event brought attention to the issue of land ownership on the island. Prime Minister Browne wants citizens to purchase their current plots of land for $1. In return, landowners would receive deeds exchangeable for bank loans. These loans are needed in order to rebuild homes destroyed during the hurricane. Browne says this proposed measure will empower citizens to own their land.

Trevor Walker, member of the council, believes that this is not a plan to empower citizens, but a way to take away land rights that are enshrined in the 2007 act.

Browne has expressed the need to have citizens come back to an environmentally conscious island that is self-sustainable and open for tourists. The island's only hospital was destroyed during the hurricane and is one of the main priorities for the Barbudan government. Browne has also indicated the possibility of having tourists come to the island to take advantage of lower health care costs once the hospital is rebuilt.
