= Eric Burton =

Barbudan politician (1931–2021)

Sir Eric Burton KCN

Leader of the Opposition
- In office 17 April 1984 – 20 February 1989
- Preceded by: Robert Hall
- Succeeded by: Baldwin Spencer

Member of the House of Representatives of Antigua and Barbuda
- In office 24 April 1980 – 20 February 1989
- Preceded by: Claude Earl-Francis
- Succeeded by: Thomas Hilbourne Frank
- Constituency: Barbuda

Personal details
- Party: Barbuda National Movement (1989)
- Other political affiliations: Progressive Labour Movement (1976); Independent (1980-1989)

Sir Eric Burton (January 9, 1931 – June 11, 2021) was a Barbudan politician, who was elected as Member of Parliament for Barbuda in the 1980 general elections and 1984 general elections. Burton served as the Leader of the Opposition from 1984 until 1989.

House of Representatives of Antigua and Barbuda
Preceded by Claude Earl-Francis	Member of Parliament for Barbuda; 1980–1989	Succeeded by Thomas Hilbourne Frank
