= Claude Earl Francis =

Antiguan politician (died 1978)

1st Chairperson of the Barbuda Council
- In office 1977 – 19 February 1978

Member of the House of Representatives of Antigua and Barbuda
- In office 11 February 1971 – 19 February 1978
- Preceded by: McChesney George
- Succeeded by: Eric Burton
- Constituency: Barbuda

Minister of Barbuda Affairs
- In office 1976 – 19 February 1978

Personal details
- Died: 19 February 1978
- Spouse: Thirza Francis

Claude Earl Francis (died 19 February 1978) practised law as a solicitor and barrister-at-law in Antigua and other Leeward Islands starting around 1950. Francis had a key role in promoting the building of Barbudan houses outside the boundaries of the Codrington village. The Barbuda Local Government Act is the work of Sir Claude Earl Francis.

== Career ==
Francis was named a Junior Minister after the Progressive Labour Movement gained the Barbuda seat in the 1971 election. Premier George Walter revoked his appointment as a minister in November 1975. It was thought that his votes against the government in the House of Representatives and criticism of the administration's new laws led to his removal from the cabinet. Francis was re-elected as an independent in the 1976 election, and in March of that same year, he was appointed Minister of Barbuda Affairs to the Vere Bird Cabinet.

== Death ==
In February 1978, Claude-Earl Francis died unexpectedly. In September 1978, an independent candidate named Eric Burton prevailed in the Barbuda by-election.

== Electoral history ==
Year	District	Party	Votes	%	Result
1976	Barbuda	Independent	145	31.45%	2nd term
1971	Barbuda	Progressive Labour Movement	211	50.00%	1st term
