= Antigua and Barbuda Democratic Movement =

Antiguan political alliance

The Antigua and Barbuda Democratic Movement (ABDM) was a political alliance in Antigua and Barbuda. It included the Antigua Democratic Labour Party and the Barbuda Democratic Movement and was led by Robert Hall.

The only general elections it contested were those of 1965. Despite receiving 20% of the vote, the alliance failed to win a seat. The alliance went on to contribute to the formation of the Progressive Labour Movement.
