= Barbuda (constituency) =

Antigua and Barbuda electoral district

- Constituency for the Parliament of Antigua and Barbuda
- Autonomous island: Barbuda
- Polling divisions: 1
- Electorate: 1,326 (2026)

Current constituency
- Party: BPM
- Member: Trevor Walker

The island of Barbuda is constitutionally mandated to have at least one parliamentary constituency within itself. The member of the house of representatives for Barbuda is also an ex officio member of the Barbuda Council. The island has one polling district, polling district "A", which supported the Barbuda People's Movement in the 2023 general elections. The current MP for Barbuda is Trevor Walker.

== Electoral history ==
Party	1971	1976	1980	1984	1989	1994	1999	2004	2009	2014	2018	2023	2026
ALP	16.82%	21.26%	32.13%	-	-	43.36%	44.04%	-	49.95%	50.05%	42.01%	42.22%	38.83%
BPM	-	-	-	-	57.90%	56.64%	55.96%	50.87%	50.05%	49.95%	54.65%	57.77%	61.17%
PLM	50.00%	19.09%	-	-	-	-	-	-	-	-	-	-	-
IND	26.30%	31.45%	67.87%	54.16%				-	-	-	0.39%	-	-
Others	6.87%	28.20%	0.00%	45.84%	42.10%	0.00%	0.00%	49.13%	0.00%	0.00%	1.27%	0.00%	0.00%
Valid	422	461	445	493	525	648	747	802	947	962	1,021	1,080	1,007
Invalid	2	2	5	4	3	2	13	3	5	6		6	8
Total	424	463	450	497	528	650	760	805	952	968		1,086	1,015
Registered	629	485	522	629	731	865	1,002	846	1,084	1,056		1,281	1,326
Turnout	67.41%	95.46%	86.21%	79.01%	72.23%	75.14%	75.85%	95.15%	87.82%	91.67%		84.78%	76.55%

== Members of parliament ==
The current member of parliament is Trevor Walker.

Year	Winner	Party	% Votes
1960	McChesney George	ALP	58.82%
1965	McChesney George	ALP	86.67%
1971	Claude-Earl Francis	PLM	50.00%
1976	Claude-Earl Francis	IND	31.45%
1980	Eric Burton	IND	67.87%
1984	Eric Burton	IND	54.16%
1989	Thomas Hilbourne Frank	BPM	57.90%
1994	Thomas Hilbourne Frank	BPM	56.64%
1999	Thomas Hilbourne Frank	BPM	55.96%
2004	Trevor Walker	BPM	50.87%
2009	Trevor Walker	BPM	50.05%
2014	Arthur Nibbs	ABLP	50.05%
2018	Trevor Walker	BPM	55.58%
2023	Trevor Walker	BPM	57.77%
2026	Trevor Walker	BPM	61.17%
