= Independence Day (Antigua and Barbuda) =

Antiguan and Barbudan holiday on November 1st

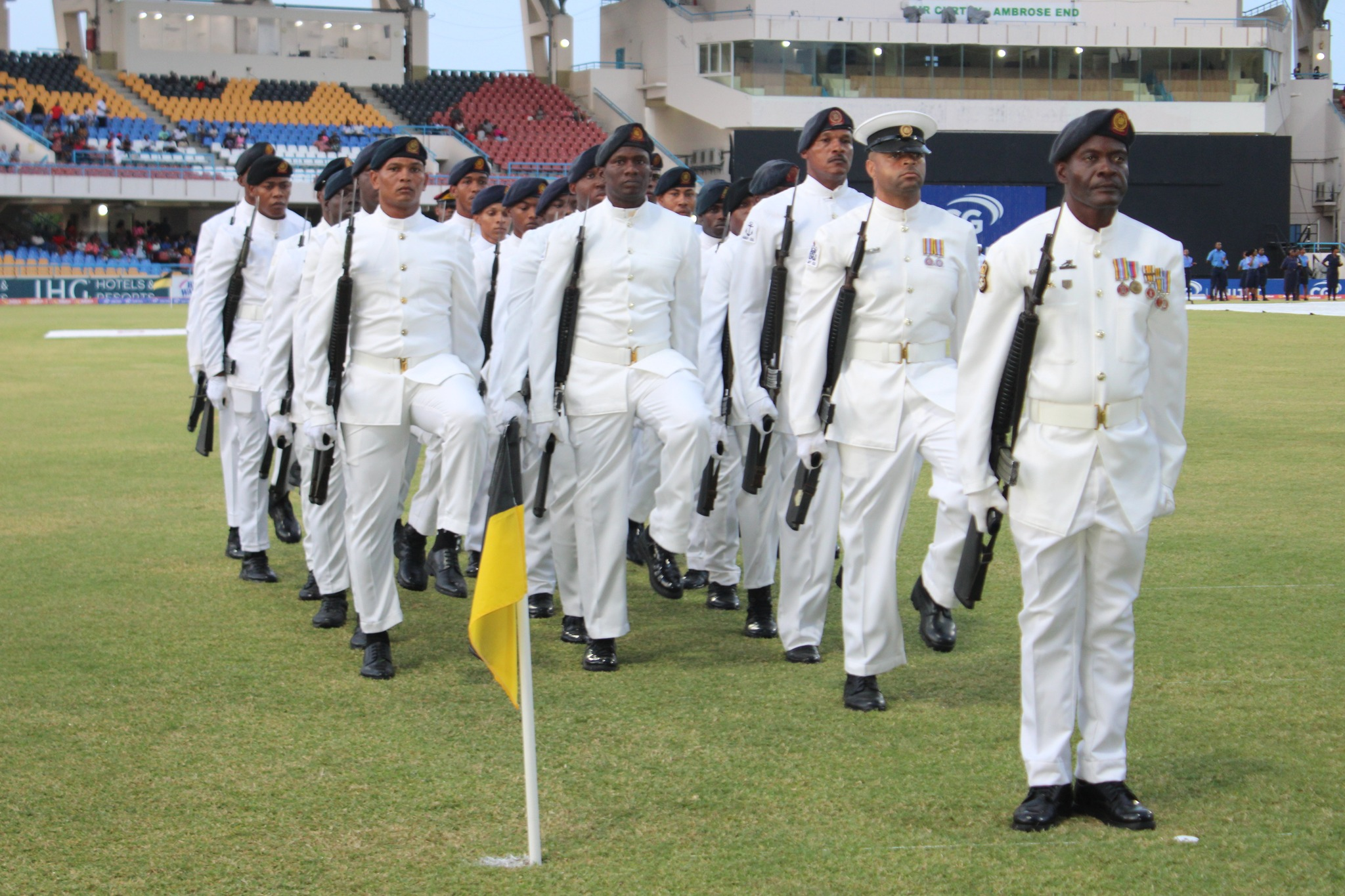
- Main military parade at Sir Vivian Richards Stadium at the 43rd anniversary of independence in 2024
- Observed by: Antiguans and Barbudans
- Type: National day
- Significance: Date of the independence of Antigua and Barbuda
- Celebrations: Parades, family reunions
- Date: 1 November
- Frequency: Annual
- First time: 1981; 45 years ago

Independence Day is a public holiday of Antigua and Barbuda, celebrated every year on 1 November. It commemorates the independence of Antigua and Barbuda, which took effect immediately after the termination of association with the United Kingdom on 1 November 1981.

Independence was granted to the country after a formal request which passed the Senate of the Associated State of Antigua on 1 May 1981, with the proposed constitution of Antigua and Barbuda being finalized by the state's government on 31 July. Independence negotiations had begun the year prior in July 1980, with some controversy due to the Barbudan nationalist movement.

Antiguans and Barbudans celebrate independence through parades, family gatherings, parties, picnics, and church services. There is also a military parade held in the evening, usually at the Sir Vivian Richards Stadium in North Sound, along with a smaller one at Madison Square in Codrington.

== Background ==
Prior to the full independence of Antigua and Barbuda, 27 February was celebrated as "independence in association", that being the date of the establishment of the Associated State of Antigua in 1967. In July 1980, a draft constitution for an independent state was debated in Antigua's parliament following the 1980 general election– deemed an unofficial independence referendum.

A constitutional conference was held in December 1980, resulting in a second draft that was passed by the House of Representatives on 23 April 1981. The draft passed the Senate on 1 May and was finalized on 31 July. Independence took effect at a ceremony on 1 November 1981 at Antigua Recreation Ground.

== Customs ==
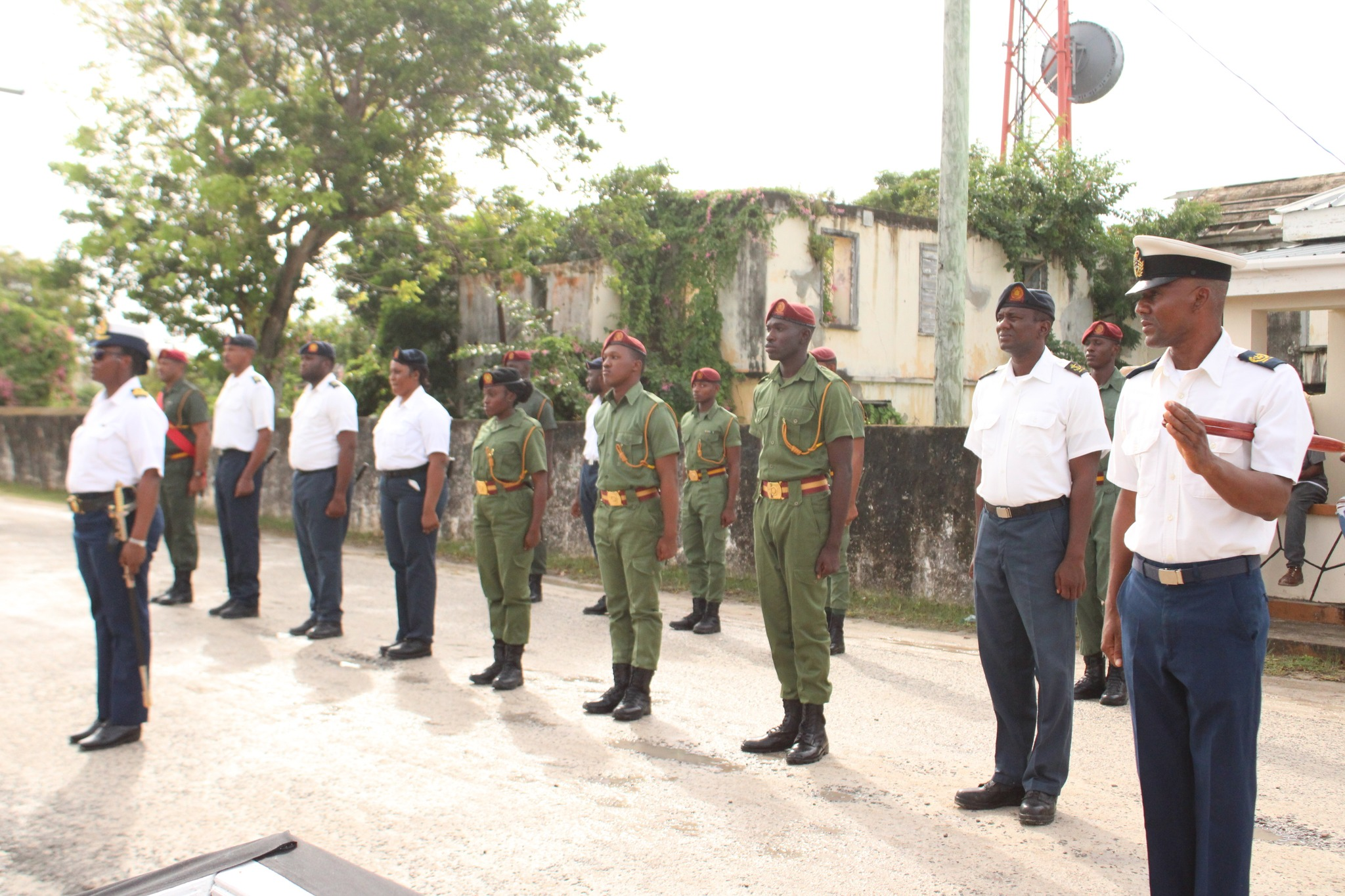
Military parade at the Government House on Madison Square in Codrington

As a public holiday, most places of business and all government offices in the country are closed on this day. If 1 November falls on a Saturday or Sunday, the following Monday is considered a public holiday. All officially sanctioned celebrations are also delayed to that date.

Traditionally, a main independence parade is held at a major stadium, either the Antigua Recreation Ground, or more recently, the Sir Vivian Richards Stadium. The prime minister tends to deliver a yearly address here, and the governor-general and many other government officials also attend. This precedent was established by Vere Bird, who delivered a televised speech entitled "A Nation to Build, A Country to Mould" shortly after the country received independence from the United Kingdom in 1981. National awards are also usually granted at this ceremony.

A parade is also held in Codrington, the only village in Barbuda. This usually takes place at the Holy Trinity School or the nearby Madison Square.

== Gallery ==
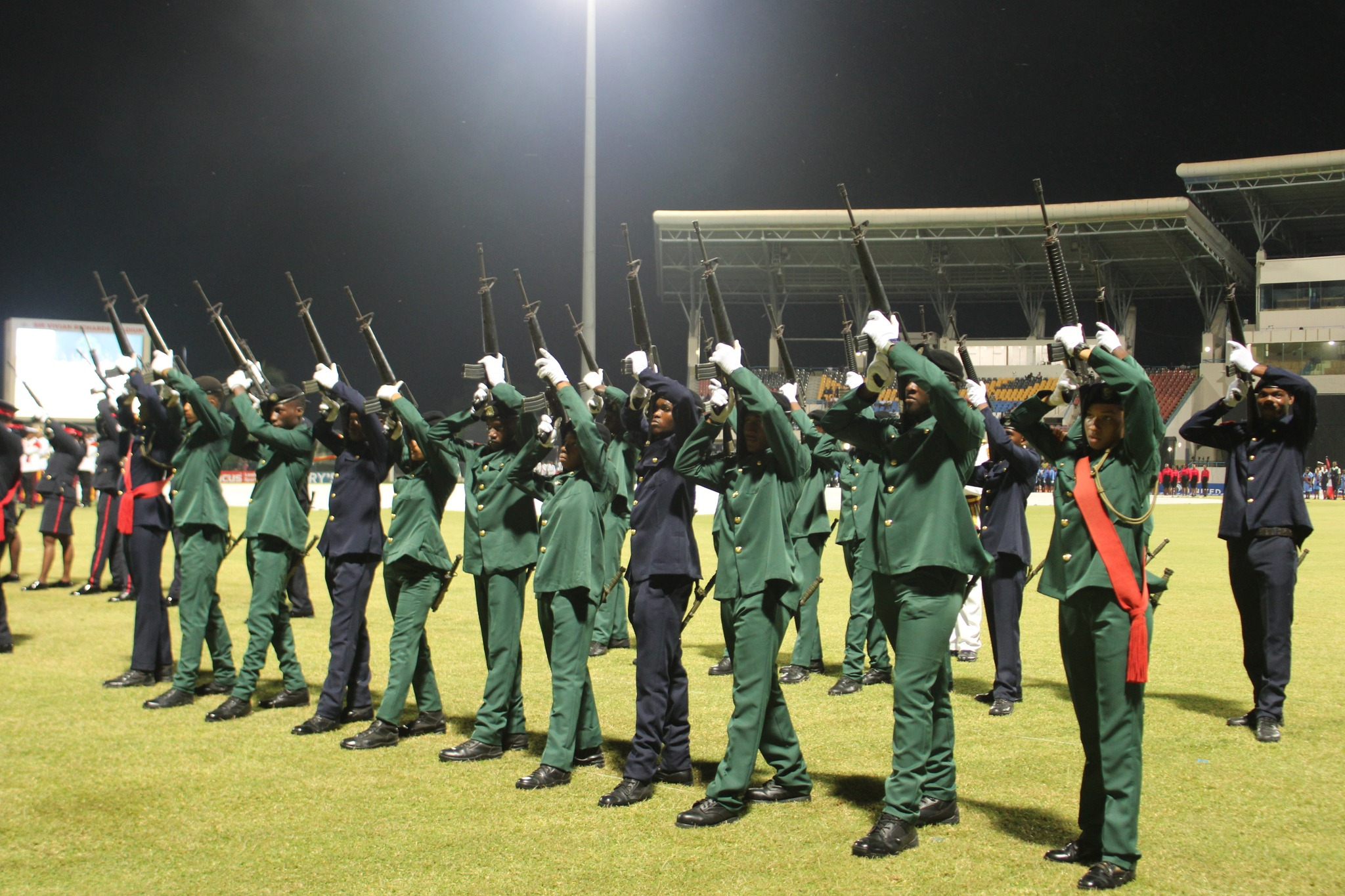
Troops firing guns at a 2024 parade

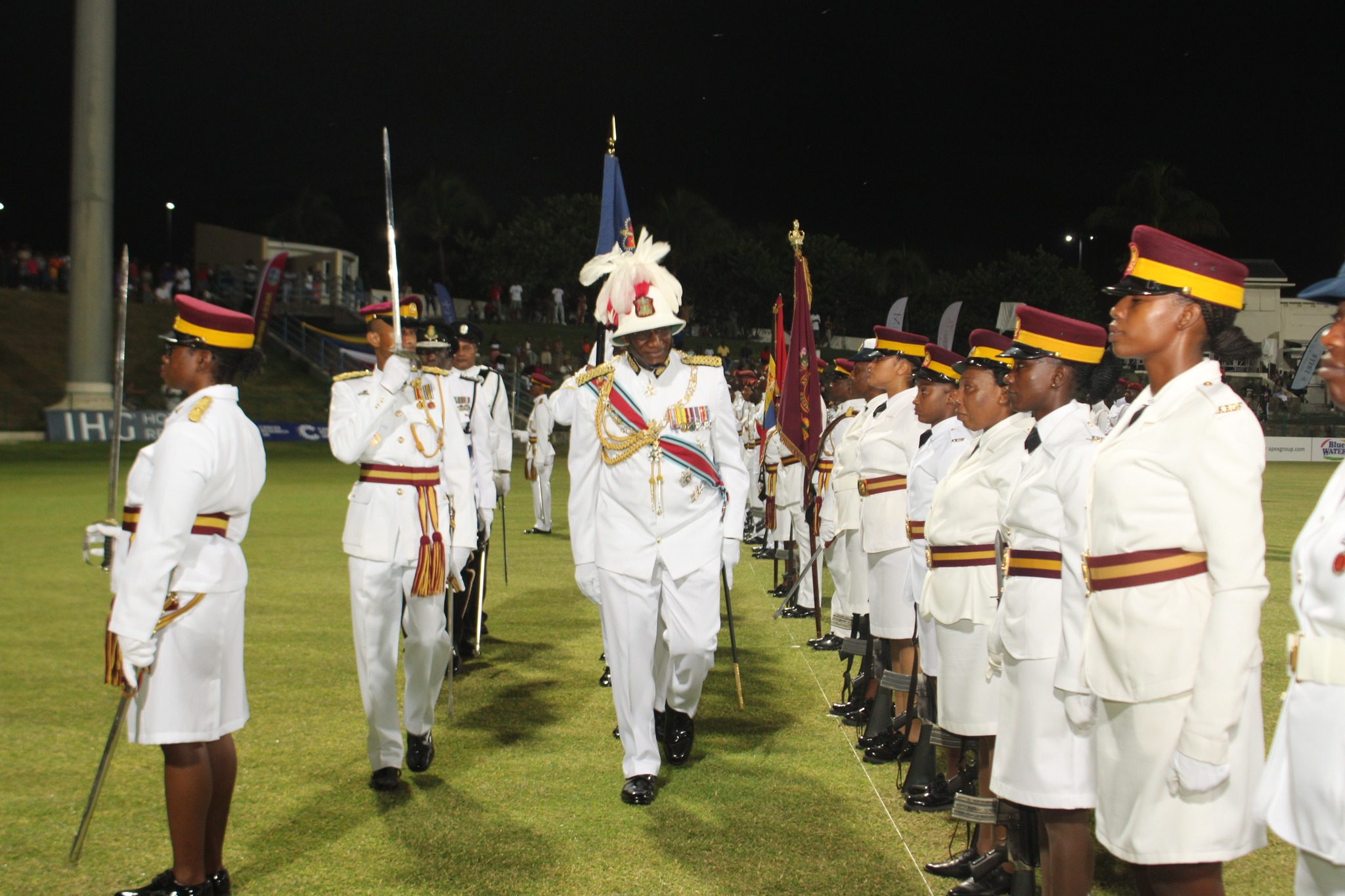
Sir Rodney Williams inspecting troops

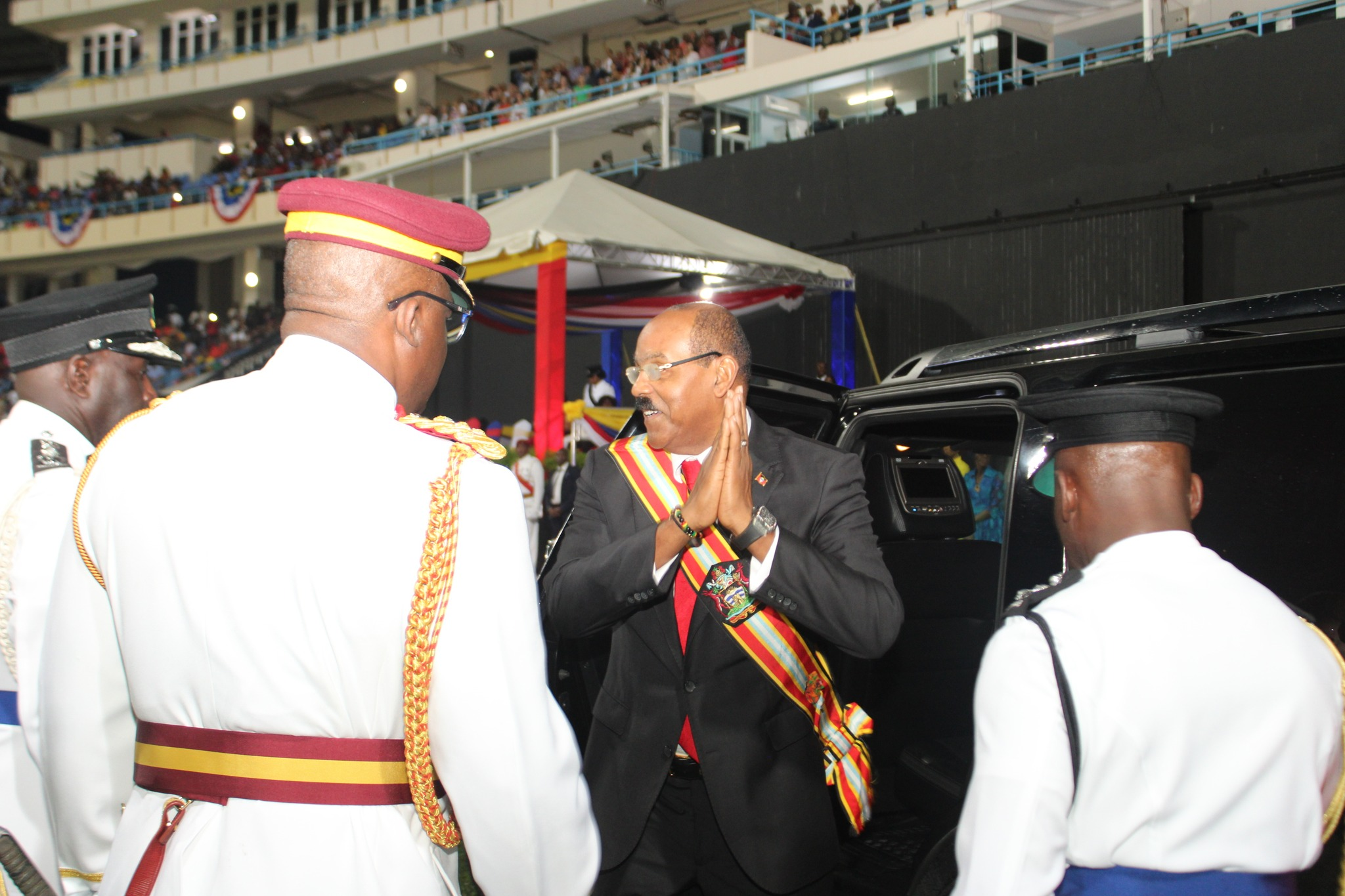
Gaston Browne arriving at a parade

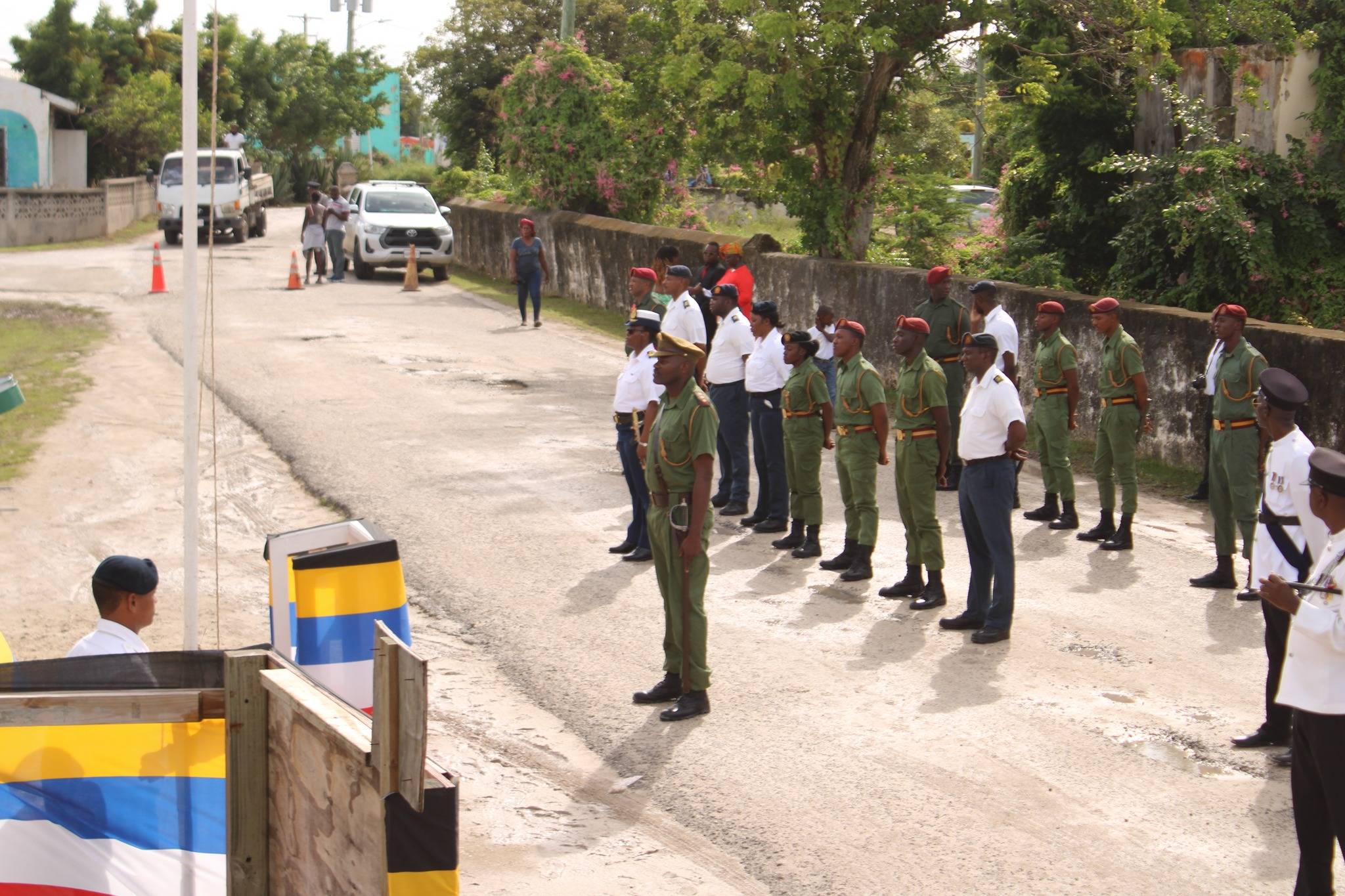
Troops in Barbuda standing at attention

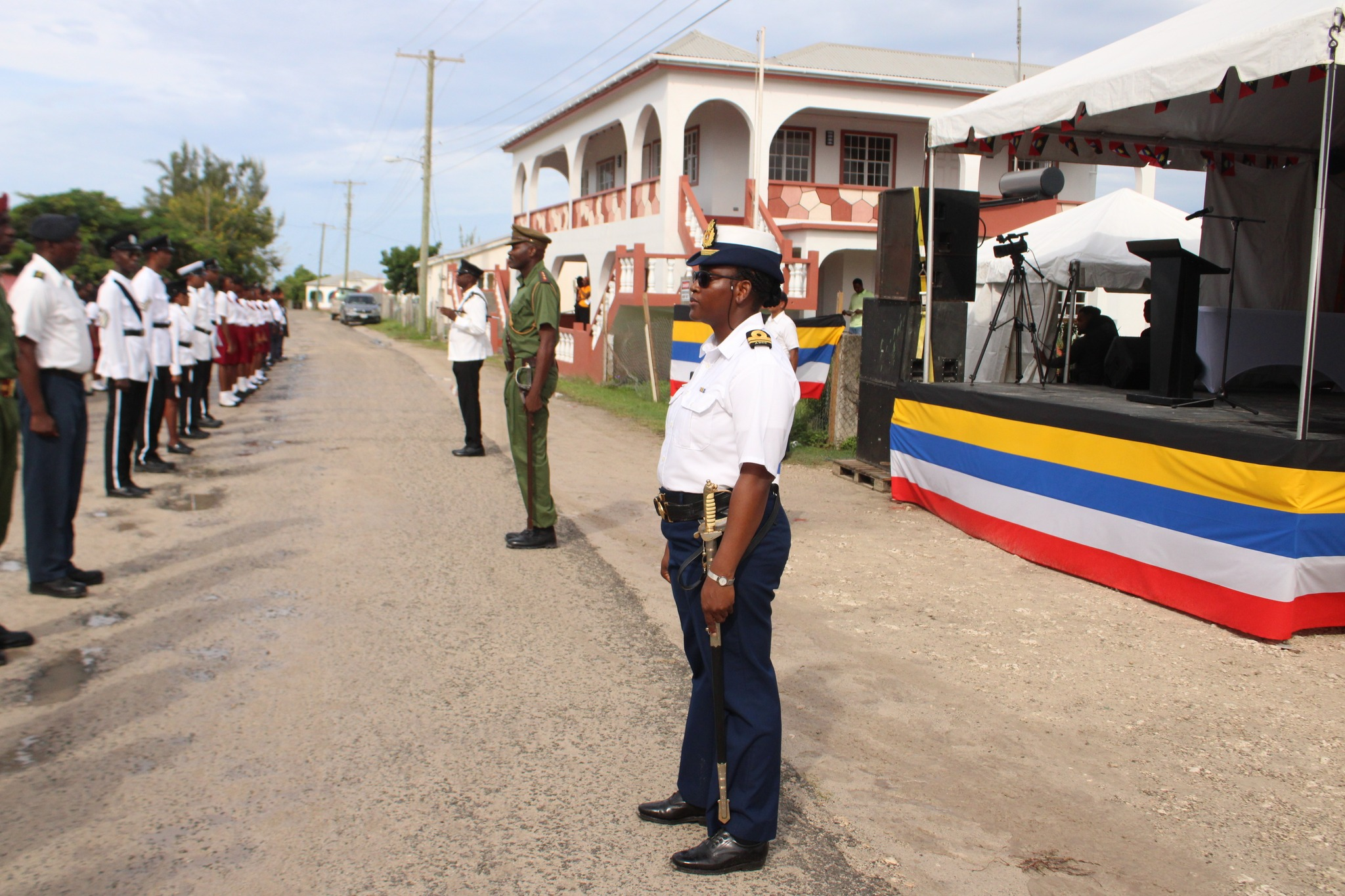
Troops awaiting an independence address in Barbuda

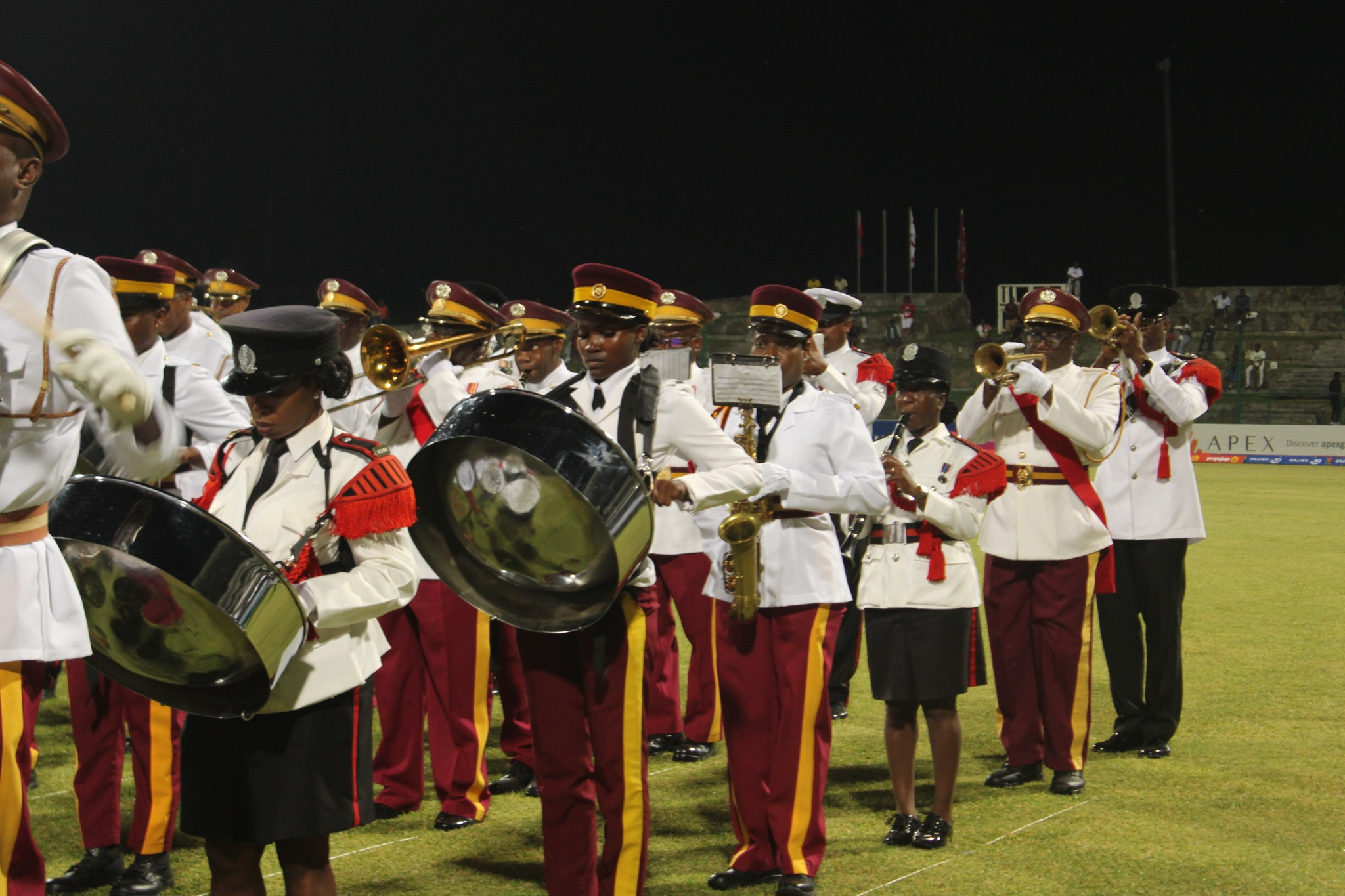
Military band

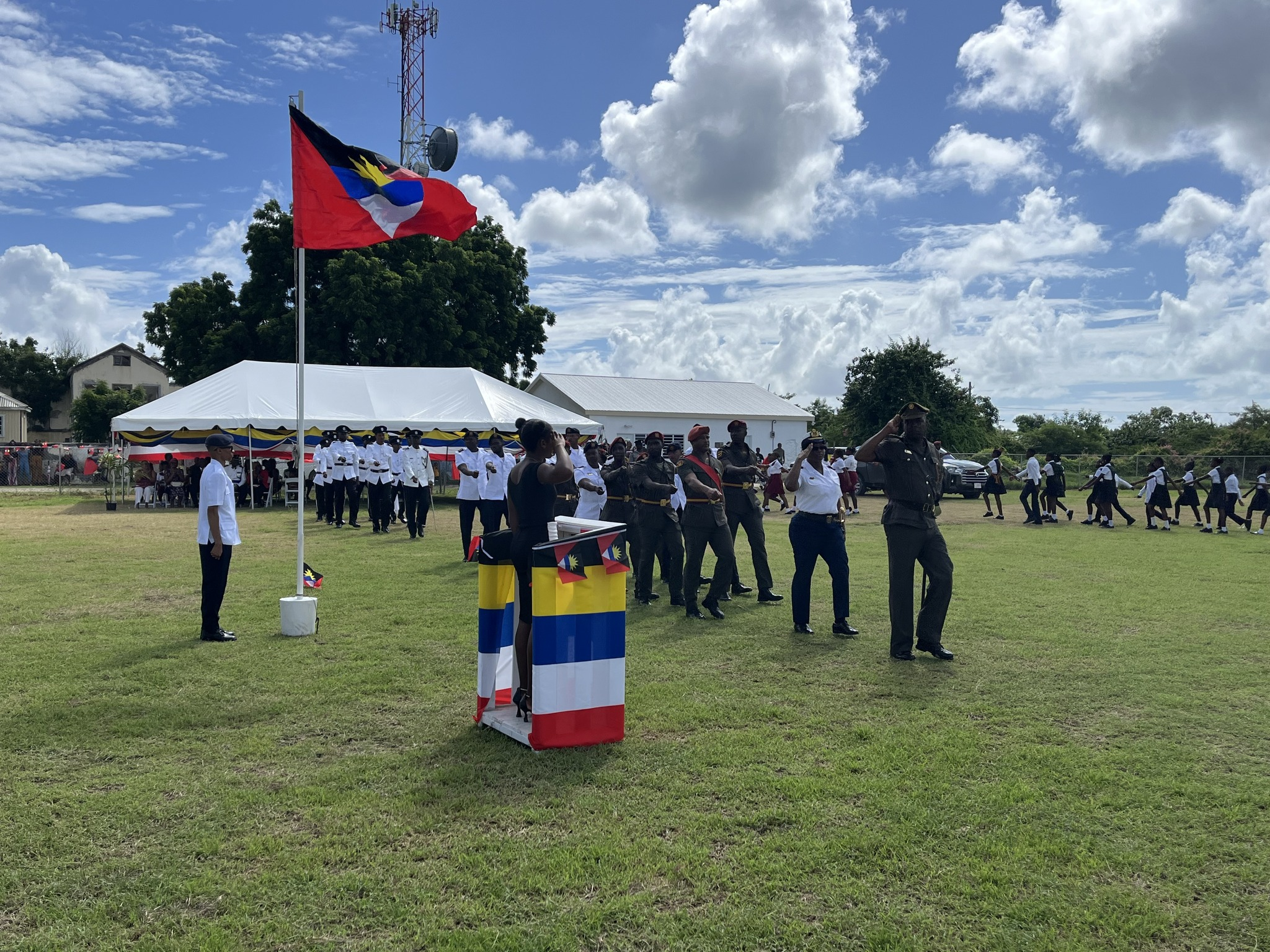
Troops marching in Barbuda

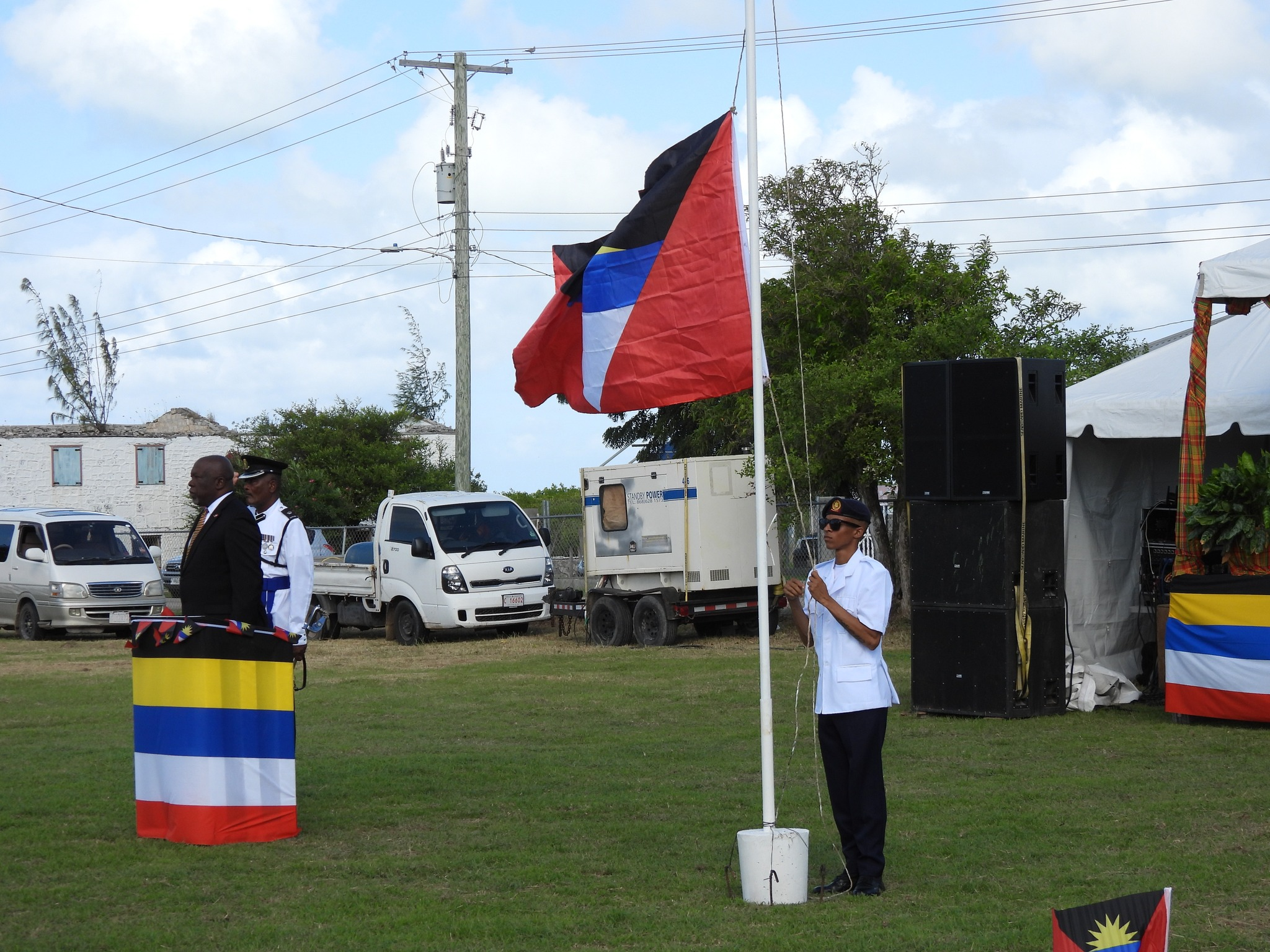
Flag raising in Barbuda in the presence of Melford Nicholas
