= Adolphus Freeland =

Antiguan politician

Sir Adolphus Freeland

Member of the House of Representatives of Antigua and Barbuda
- In office 18 February 1976 – 19 February 1999
- Preceded by: Sydney Prince
- Succeeded by: Jacqui Quinn-Leandro
- Constituency: St. George

Minister of Labour, Health, and Home Affairs
- In office 20 February 1976 – 19 May 1978

Minister of Barbuda Affairs and Labour
- In office 19 May 1978 – November 1982

Minister of Labour, Housing, Cooperatives and Development Control Authority
- In office November 1982 – unknown

Personal details
- Born: 1934 Antigua and Barbuda
- Died: 18 January 2014 (aged 79–80) Antigua and Barbuda
- Party: Antigua Labour Party

Sir Adolphus Freeland was an Antigua Labour Party politician and Leeward Islands cricketer, who served as Member of Parliament for St. George from 1976 to 1999. He was born in 1934, and died on 18 January 2014 after a brief illness. Freeland additionally held various portfolios in the Vere Bird administration.

House of Representatives of Antigua and Barbuda
Preceded by Sydney Prince	Member of Parliament for St. George; 1976–1999	Succeeded by Jacqui Quinn-Leandro
