= Human rights in Antigua and Barbuda =

Human rights in Antigua and Barbuda comprise a series of rights legally protected by the Constitution of Antigua and Barbuda. Additionally, the Parliament of Antigua and Barbuda has ratified various international conventions and treaties to protect the human rights of its population. If a person in Antigua and Barbuda believes that their constitutional rights have been violated, they may appeal to the Antigua and Barbuda High Court.

== Gender equality ==
Antigua and Barbuda faces significant issues with gender equality. As of December 2020, Antigua and Barbuda has only adopted 44.4% of legal frameworks that protect women's rights, and as of December 2024, only 5.6% of seats in the House of Representatives and 41.2% of seats held in the unelected Senate are held by women. Women have rose to some important political positions in Antigua and Barbuda, such as the former governor-general Louise Lake-Tack, multiple speakers of the House of Representatives, and the current president of the Senate Alincia Williams-Grant. The first woman elected to the House of Representatives was Jacqui Quinn-Leandro in 2004. Discrimination by sex in Antigua and Barbuda is prohibited by section three of the Constitution.

== Freedoms ==
=== Freedom of the press ===
Freedom of the press does not have a particularly reputable history. This dates back to before independence, when the Antiguan government under V. C. Bird expelled Bobby Margetson from the associated state for critical claims he made while on broadcast. On 23 July 1982, twenty police officers raided The Outlet, a socialist anti-government newspaper. Later that year, the High Court ruled the raid unconstitutional. The editor of the newspaper, Tim Hector, was later charged with defamation for his comments in the newspaper, although the Privy Council later ruled this action unconstitutional as well. The press continues to be attacked in Antigua and Barbuda, with Prime Minister Gaston Browne frequently suing his political opponents and opposition newspapers for defamation.

=== Freedom of religion ===
Freedom of religion is generally respected in Antigua and Barbuda. However, the present Antigua and Barbuda Labour Party government has used the preamble to the Constitution of Antigua and Barbuda as justification for bringing religion into public schools. After a series of youth violence incidents in 2024, Browne required that all public schools in the country conduct a mandatory Christian prayer in their morning assemblies. Also in 2024, the government established a national day of prayer. The government has expressed a commitment to the protection of the Rastafarians, however.
