= Leader of the Opposition (Antigua and Barbuda) =

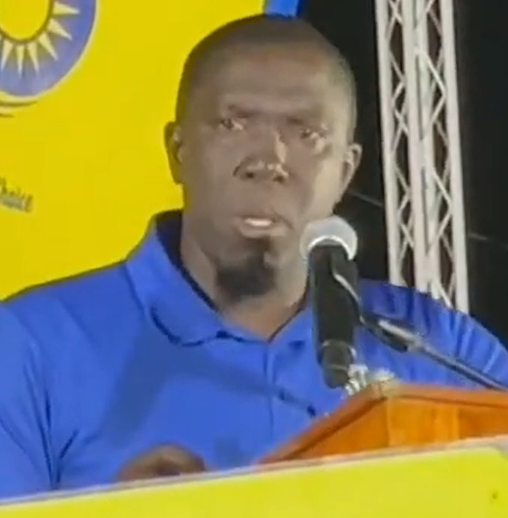
- Incumbent; Jamale Pringle since 21 March 2018
- Appointer: The governor-general
- Formation: December 1968
- First holder: Robert Hall
- Salary: EC$72,000 per annum

The leader of the opposition, officially the leader of His Majesty's Opposition, is the leader of the largest political party in the House of Representatives of Antigua and Barbuda that is not in government. The Leader of the Opposition is appointed by the Governor-General of Antigua and Barbuda.

== Appointment and disqualification ==
The Governor-General must select the opposition leader, except when there aren't any House members who are against the government. When the need for a opposition leader arises, the Governor-General must appoint the member of the House who, in their opinion, is most likely to be supported by the majority of House members who oppose the government; or, if no member of the House appears to them to be so supported, the member of the House who, in their opinion, is most likely to be supported by the largest single group of House members who oppose the government provided that the Governor-General may, acting in his discretion, appoint any one of the two or more members of the House who oppose the government as opposition leader. In exercising this discretion, the Governor-General shall be guided by each member's seniority based on the number of years of service as a member of the House and by the votes cast in favor of each at the most recent election of members.

If it is essential to select a opposition leader between the time that Parliament is dissolved and the day that the members of the House are subsequently elected, the appointment may be made as if Parliament was never dissolved. The Governor-General must remove the opposition leader from office if it appears that they can no longer gather the support of the largest group of members of the House who are against the Government or the majority of members of the House who are against the Government.

== Role ==
The opposition leader has the following constitutionally mandated responsibilities:

- The Governor-General, acting on the counsel of the opposition leader, must appoint four senators.
- The Governor-General, acting in line with the Prime Minister's advice and following consultation with the opposition leader, must select the Chairman of the Constituencies Boundaries Commission.
- The Governor-General, in agreement with the Prime Minister and the opposition leader, appoints no more than four additional members of the Advisory Committee on the Prerogative of Mercy.
- The Prime Minister must consult the opposition leader before giving the Governor-General any advise about the Public Service Commission.
- The Prime Minister must first consult with the opposition leader before offering any advice to the Governor-General about the Public Service Commission, the Police Service Commission, or the Public Service Board of Appeal.

== Leaders of the Opposition ==
Name	Took office	Left office	Party	Notes
Robert Hall	December 1968	1970	PLM	
George Walter	1970	1971	PLM	
Ernest Williams	1971	1976	ABLP	
George Walter	1976	1979	PLM	
Robert Hall	1979	1984	PLM	
Eric Burton	1984	1989	IND	
Baldwin Spencer	1989	2004	UPP	
Robin Yearwood	2004	2006	ABLP	
Steadroy Benjamin	2006	March 2009	ABLP	
Lester Bird	March 2009	December 2012	ABLP	
Gaston Browne	December 2012	June 2014	ABLP	
Baldwin Spencer	June 2014	March 2018	UPP	
Jamale Pringle	March 2018	Incumbent	UPP	

== See also ==
- Politics of Antigua and Barbuda
- Governor-General of Antigua and Barbuda
- Prime Minister of Antigua and Barbuda
