= Antigua Democratic Labour Party =

Antiguan political party

The Antigua Democratic Labour Party was a political party in Antigua and Barbuda. In the 1960 general elections it received only 66 votes (2.6%) and failed to win a seat. It was part of the Antigua and Barbuda Democratic Movement for the 1965 elections, in which it again failed to win a seat.
