= Antigua People's Party =

Extinct political party in Antigua and Barbuda

The Antigua People's Party was a minor political party in Antigua and Barbuda. It began as a faction within the Progressive Labour Movement, an opposition party founded in 1968. This faction, called the Antigua Progressive Movement, believed that the state's political parties should be separate from the trade unions. In 1969, the faction left the PLM to campaign independently. It attracted few votes at the 1971 general election, and it soon folded into the Antigua Labour Party.
