= United People's Movement (Antigua and Barbuda) =

Antiguan political party

The United People's Movement was a political party in Antigua and Barbuda and led by former Prime Minister George Walter. It was established in 1982, when Walter was expelled from Progressive Labour Movement. The party contested the general elections of 1984, in which the party received 23% of the vote, but failed to win a seat. The party merged in 1986 to United National Democratic Party.
