= Barbuda Independence Movement =

The Barbudan independence movement seeks the independence of Barbuda from Antigua.

Barbuda Independence Movement may also refer to:

- Barbuda Independence Movement (political party), a former political party in Barbuda
- Barbuda People's Movement, which introduced Barbuda's secession request into the 15th legislature of Antigua and Barbuda
