= Antigua Observer =

Antiguan newspaper

- "Let There Be Light"
- Type: Daily newspaper
- Owner: NewsCo Limited
- Editor: Algernon Watts
- Founded: 1993
- Language: English
- Headquarters: St. John's, Antigua and Barbuda
- City: St. John's, Antigua and Barbuda
- Country: Antigua and Barbuda
- Website: antiguaobserver.com

The Antigua Observer is a newspaper of Antigua and Barbuda based in St. John's. Established in 1993, the paper is owned by NewsCo Limited and covers domestic, regional, and international news. The paper was founded by Winston and Samuel Derrick and was originally distributed only through fax. At the time, it was one of the only non-government affiliated media companies in country.

The paper is considered to be aligned with the United Progressive Party and regularly endorses them along with the Barbuda People's Movement in general elections. This has caused conflict between the paper and the Labour Party government. Due to the success of the newspaper, NewsCo has since launched other subsidiaries including Observer Radio and HITZ FM.

Since 2018, the newspaper is published solely online, both on its website and in a daily PDF version. The newspaper has received praise for its perceived independence in a country where freedom of the press has been hindered.

The paper is edited and published by Algernon Watts, and is headquartered at the ABI Financial Building in Downtown St. John's.
