= 1976 Antiguan general election =

- 18 February 1976

All 17 seats in the House of Representatives 9 seats needed for a majority
- Turnout: 94.97% (▲35.05pp)
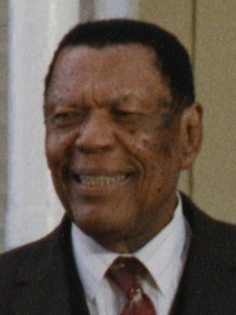

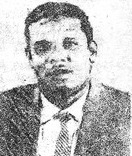
	First party	Second party
Leader	Vere Bird	George Walter
Party	ALP	PLM
Seats won	11	5
Seat change	▲7	▼8
Popular vote	12,056	12,268
Percentage	49.01%	49.87%
Swing	▲11.11pp	▼7.85pp
- Results by constituency
Premier before election
George Walter
PLM
Subsequent Premier
Vere Bird
ALP

General elections were held in Antigua and Barbuda on 18 February 1976. Whilst the Progressive Labour Movement received the most votes, the opposition Antigua Labour Party won more than double the number of seats. ALP leader Vere Bird was elected Premier of Antigua. Bird had previously served as head of government of Antigua and Barbuda between 1960 and 1971. He defeated the incumbent Premier George Walter of the Progressive Labour Movement.

The elections marked the second change of government in the history of Antigua and Barbuda. Voter turnout was 95%.

== Results ==
Party	Votes	%	Seats	+/–
Progressive Labour Movement	12,268	49.87	5	–8
Antigua Labour Party	12,056	49.01	11	+7
Independents	275	1.12	1	+1
Total	24,599	100.00	17	0
Valid votes	24,599	98.87		
Invalid/blank votes	280	1.13		
Total votes	24,879	100.00		
Registered voters/turnout	26,197	94.97		
Source: Nohlen
