= Dean Jonas =

Antiguan politician

Dean Jonas MP

Member of the House of Representatives of Antigua and Barbuda
- In office 12 June 2014 – 16 December 2022
- Preceded by: Jacqui Quinn-Leandro
- Succeeded by: Algernon Watts
- Constituency: St. George

Personal details
- Party: Antigua and Barbuda Labour Party

Dean Jonas is an Antiguan Labour Party politician who was elected as Member of Parliament for St. George in the general election held on 12 June 2014. On 28 December 2022, he has been nominated as ABLP candidate for 2023 General Elections. On 18 January 2023 he was defeated by UPP candidate Algernon Watts. He was afterwards appointed as Advisor to the Minister with Responsibility for the Blue Economy, but he had his appointment revoked by Prime Minister Gaston Browne on 1 November 2023. On 19 September 2024 Jonas was appointed as Ambassador at large.
