= Robert Hall (Antiguan politician) =

Sir Robert Hall

Leader of the Opposition
- In office 1979–1984
- Preceded by: George Walter
- Succeeded by: Eric Burton

Deputy Premier of Antigua
- In office 1971–1976
- Prime Minister: George Walter
- Succeeded by: Lester Bird

Minister of Agriculture
- In office 1971–1976

Leader of the Opposition
- In office December 1968 – 1970
- Succeeded by: George Walter

Personal details
- Born: 1909 Colony of Antigua and Barbuda
- Died: 1994 (aged 84–85) Antigua and Barbuda
- Party: Progressive Labour Movement

Sir Robert Hall (1909–1994) was a politician of Antigua and Barbuda. Hall was an opponent of the dominant Antigua Labour Party throughout his career. He was politically active mainly during Antigua and Barbuda's time as a West Indies Associated State.

== Career ==
During the 1960s, Hall led the Antigua and Barbuda Democratic Movement. This very loose political organisation was most significant for the role it allowed Hall to play in the creation of the Progressive Labour Movement (PLM) in 1968. After the party won four by-elections, it became Antigua and Barbuda's first parliamentary opposition party. Hall was the first leader of this party and was appointed as the first parliamentary Leader of the Opposition in the state, but he relinquished this role to George Walter before the 1971 general election.

Hall served as Deputy Premier of Antigua during the Progressive Labour Movement government of 1971–76, and during that period he was also the first Minister for Agriculture in the state. Agricultural policy had been divided among several separate civil service bodies during the previous administration. His flagship policy was diversification of agriculture away from the archipelago's heavy dependence on sugar exports, and to increase the cultivation of other crops, such as the pineapple.

Hall assumed the leadership of the Progressive Labour Movement for a second time in time for the 1980 general election, due to the electoral defeat and subsequent imprisonment of his predecessor, George Walter, on false corruption charges relating to PLM economic mismanagement. Though a free man by 1980, Walter had been barred from participating in the election. This oppression diminished the appeal of opposition parties, and Hall left the legislature in 1984, three years after the full independence of Antigua and Barbuda.

Hall died in 1994, and was posthumously knighted by the United Progressive Party government that came to power in 2004. Outside politics, Hall was a planter and farmer, as well as a former civil servant in the field of agriculture. He was a White Antiguan. Hall's family owns Smith's Estate in Saint Mary, which was redeveloped by himself and other members of his family.
