= Nathaniel Francis (Antiguan politician) =

Antiguan politician

Nathaniel Francis MP

Member of the House of Representatives of Antigua and Barbuda
- In office 9 March 1999 – 26 February 2004
- Preceded by: Adolphus Freeland
- Succeeded by: Jacqui Quinn-Leandro
- Constituency: St. George

Personal details
- Party: United Progressive Party

Nathaniel Francis is an Antiguan United Progressive Party politician, who was elected as Member of Parliament for St. George in the 1999 general election.
