= Chairperson of the Barbuda Council =

Chairperson of Barbuda Council
- Seal of the Barbuda Council

- Flag of the Barbuda Council
- Incumbent; John Mussington since 7 April 2025
- Precursor: Warden
- Deputy: Vice Chairperson of the Barbuda Council (Nadia George)
- Salary: 44,100 EC$ annually

The Chairperson of the Barbuda Council is the leader of the Barbuda Council. Established by the Barbuda Local Government Act of 1976, the first council election was on March 22, 1979.

== Role ==
The council's members vote for the chairperson. Every January or at the first council meeting following an election, the chair is chosen. The representative representing Barbuda in the House of Representatives is in charge of the council meeting when a chairperson is being chosen. The members elect a Chairman, as the case may be, to fill the vacancy caused if the Chairman resigns, dies, or is otherwise ineligible to serve on the Council during its term.

== List ==
Below is a table of the chairpersons of the Barbuda Council.

Incumbent	Tenure		Party
Incumbent	Took office	Left office	Party
Claude Earl Francis	1977	Feb 1978	
McChesney George	1978	1979	ABLP
Hilbourne Frank (1st time)	1979	1985	BPM
Arthur Nibbs (1st time)	1985	1987	ONR
Emmanuel Punter	1987?	1989?	BPM
Hilbourne Frank (2nd time)	1989	1996	BPM
John Thomas	1996	1997	ABLP
Arthur Nibbs (2nd time)	1997	April 2001	BPM
Fabian Jones (1st time)	April 2001	2005	BPM
Lincoln Burton	2005	19 January 2006	BPM
Randolph Beazer	19 January 2006	9 January 2008	BPM
Fabian Jones (2nd time)	9 January 2008	31 March 2009	BPM
Kelvin Punter	1 April 2009	March 2013	BPM
Arthur Nibbs (3rd time)	March 2013	31 March 2015	ABLP
David Shaw	1 April 2015	March 2017	ABLP
Knacyntar Nedd	March 2017	9 May 2018	ABLP
Wayde Burton	9 May 2018	7 January 2020	BPM
Calsey Joseph	7 January 2020	12 April 2021	BPM
Jacklyn Frank	12 April 2021	January 2022	BPM
Mackenzie Frank	January 2022	16 January 2024	BPM
Devon Warner	16 January 2024	7 April 2025	BPM
John Mussington	7 April 2025	present	BPM

Additionally, the council was chaired by Francilla Francis / Francine Francis before 1995, probably sometime between 1984 and 1988.
