= St. George (constituency) =

Electoral unit of Antigua and Barbuda

- Constituency for the Parliament of Antigua and Barbuda
- Polling divisions: 3
- Electorate: 5,997 (2026)

Current constituency
- Party: APLB
- Member: Michael Freeland

St. George is a parliamentary constituency in Saint John and Saint George, Antigua and Barbuda. It is composed of the villages of New Winthorpes, Barnes Hill, Powells, Potters, Piggotts, Osbourn, Jonas, and Scotts Hill.

Most polling stations and all three polling districts in the constituency were dominated by the United Progressive Party during the 2023 general elections.

== Electoral history ==
Party	1971	1976	1980	1984	1989	1994	1999	2004	2009	2014	2018	2023	2026
ALP	40.88%	51.62%	62.72%	76.90%	62.04%	52.34%	49.55%	36.33%	42.76%	54.51%	56.68%	47.46%	60.80%
UPP	-	-	-	23.10%	35.67%	47.66%	49.74%	63.67%	57.24%	44.09%	39.51%	50.80%	37.59%
PLM	59.12%	48.38%	37.28%	-	-	-	-	-	-	-	-	-	-
Others	0.00%	0.00%	0.00%	0.00%	2.28%	0.00%	0.71%	0.00%	0.00%	1.40%	3.29%	1.27%	1.61%
Valid	1,272	1,885	1,757	1,459	1,752	2,090	2,674	3,336	3,468	4,003	3,675	4,205	3,615
Invalid	34	18	14	13	3	8	13	10	20	9		19	27
Total	1,306	1,903	1,771	1,472	1,755	2,098	2,687	3,346	3,488	4,012		4,224	3,642
Registered	1,906	1,964	2,207	2,337	2,720	3,180	3,977	3,668	4,414	4,535		5,883	5,997
Turnout	68.52%	96.89%	80.24%	62.99%	64.52%	65.97%	67.56%	91.22%	79.02%	88.47%		71.80%	60.73%

== Members of parliament ==
The current member of parliament is Michael Freeland.

Year	Winner	Party	% Votes
1971	Sydney Prince	PLM	59.12%
1976	Adolphus Freeland	ALP	51.62%
1980	Adolphus Freeland	ALP	62.72%
1984	Adolphus Freeland	ALP	76.90%
1989	Adolphus Freeland	ALP	62.04%
1994	Adolphus Freeland	ALP	52.34%
1999	Nathaniel 'Nat Moses' Francis	UPP	49.74%
2004	Jacqui Quinn-Leandro	UPP	63.67%
2009	Jacqui Quinn-Leandro	UPP	57.24%
2014	Dean Jonas	ABLP	54.51%
2018	Dean Jonas	ABLP	56.97%
2023	Algernon Watts	UPP	50.80%
2026	Michael Freeland	ABLP	60.80%
