= Sydney Prince =

Antiguan politician

Sydney Prince MP

Member of the House of Representatives of Antigua and Barbuda
- In office 11 February 1971 – 31 January 1976
- Preceded by: Joseph Lawrence
- Succeeded by: Adolphus Freeland
- Constituency: St. George

Personal details
- Political party: Progressive Labour Movement

Sydney Prince is an Antiguan Progressive Labour Movement politician, who was elected as Member of Parliament for St. George in the 1971 general election. He was Minister of Public Works, Housing, and Communications from February 1971 to January 1974, and then Minister of Finance, Industry and Tourism from January 1974 to 1 February 1976.

He was the chairman of Progressive Labour Movement in 1974.
