= McChesney George =

Barbudan politician

Sir McChesney George

Member of the House of Representatives of Antigua and Barbuda
- In office 29 November 1960 – 5 December 1970
- Preceded by: constituency established
- Succeeded by: Claude Earl-Francis
- Constituency: Barbuda

Personal details
- Party: Antigua Labour Party

Sir McChesney George was a Labour Party politician from Barbuda, who was elected as Member of Parliament for Barbuda in the 1960 and 1965 general elections.

The Sir McChesney George Secondary School in the Indigo section of Codrington is named after him.

House of Representatives of Antigua and Barbuda
Preceded by Constituency part of St. John's City South/Barbuda; Edmund Lake	Member of Parliament for Barbuda; 1960–1970	Succeeded by Claude-Earl Francis
