= ABWU =

ABWU may refer to:

- All Bengal Women's Union, a non-governmental organization
- Antigua Workers' Union, a national trade union of Antigua and Barbuda
