= Nathaniel Francis =

Nathaniel Francis may refer to:

- Nathaniel Francis (Turks and Caicos Islander politician) (1912–2004)
- Nathaniel Francis (Antiguan politician) (fl. 1999–2004)
