= Tomlinson House (Antigua) =

Official historic site of Antigua and Barbuda

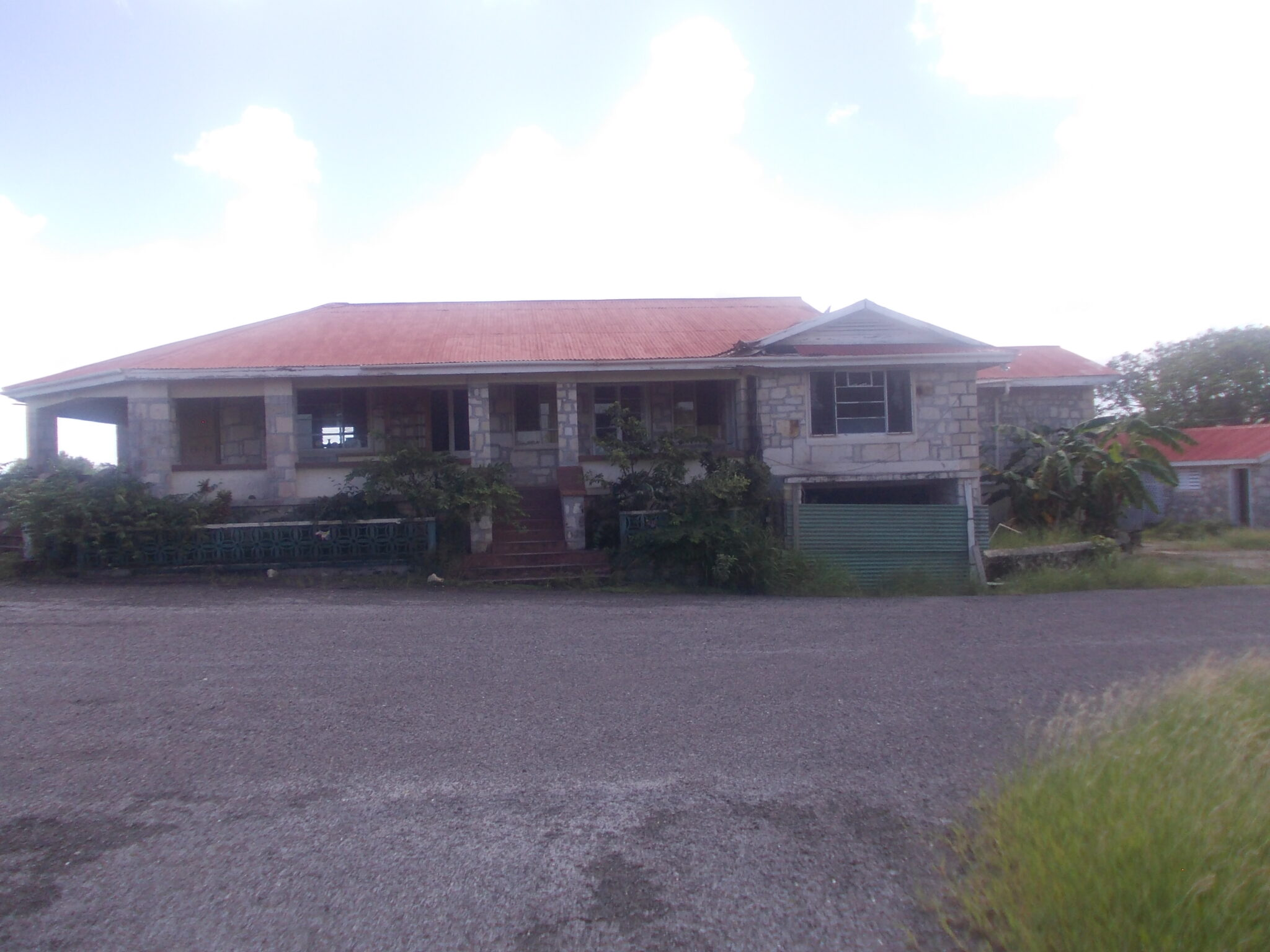

- Location within Antigua and Barbuda
- 17°06′52.48″N 61°48′54.65″W
- Location: Tomlinson, Antigua and Barbuda

History
- Built: 1948

Historical Site of Antigua and Barbuda

Tomlinson House is a historical site of Antigua and Barbuda and a former sugar estate located in Tomlinson. Under Vere Bird, the house was the official residence of the prime minister of Antigua and Barbuda. The sugar estate was established in 1708. George Walter and Bird were both interred here. This house is the second house on the estate: the old one was demolished by Sir Alexander Moody-Stuart in 1948. When slavery was abolished, the Tomlinson family was granted about two-thousand pounds for 145 enslaved people at the estate. Heads of the Antigua Syndicate Estates would reside here.
