= 1989 Antiguan general election =

- 9 March 1989

All 17 seats in the House of Representatives 9 seats needed for a majority
- Turnout: 60.72% (▼0.40pp)
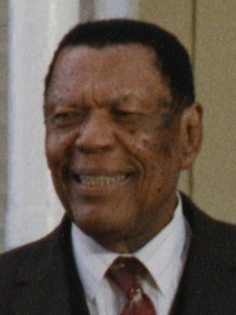

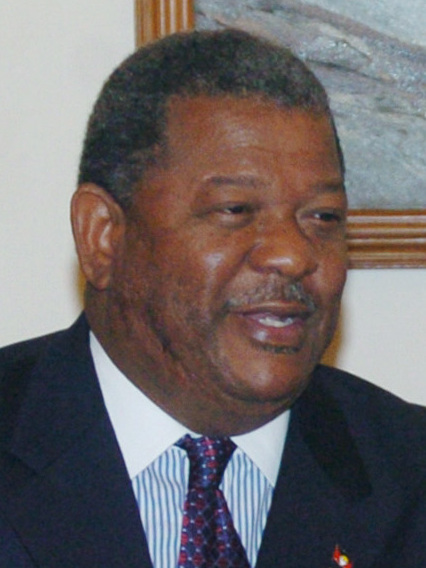

	First party	Second party	Third party
Leader	Vere Bird	Baldwin Spencer	Hilbourne Frank
Party	ALP	UNDP	BPM
Seats won	15	1	1
Seat change	▼1	▲1	▲1
Popular vote	14,207	6,889	304
Percentage	63.85%	30.96%	1.37%
Swing	▼4.05pp	▲30.96pp	▲1.37pp
- Results by constituency
Prime Minister before election
Vere Bird
ALP
Subsequent Prime Minister
Vere Bird
ALP

General elections were held in Antigua and Barbuda on 9 March 1989, the second after it had become an independent Commonwealth realm. The elections were won by the governing Antigua Labour Party (ALP), whose leader Vere Bird was reelected as prime minister. Voter turnout was 60.7%.

This was Bird's eighth and final election victory. He resigned as prime minister in 1994, just before the subsequent general elections. Bird was replaced by his son, Lester Bird, the long-time party chairman.

== Results ==
Party	Votes	%	Seats	+/–
Antigua Labour Party	14,207	63.85	15	–1
United National Democratic Party	6,889	30.96	1	New
Antigua Caribbean Liberation Movement	435	1.96	0	New
Barbuda People's Movement	304	1.37	1	New
Barbuda Democratic Movement	150	0.67	0	New
Barbuda Independence Movement	71	0.32	0	New
Independents	193	0.87	0	–1
Total	22,249	100.00	17	0
Valid votes	22,249	99.37		
Invalid/blank votes	141	0.63		
Total votes	22,390	100.00		
Registered voters/turnout	36,876	60.72		
Source: Nohlen
