= List of foreign ministers in 1991 =

This is a list of foreign ministers in 1991.

== Africa ==
| Flag | Country | Foreign minister | Term |
|---|---|---|---|
| (Algeria) | Algeria | Sid Ahmed Ghozali; Lakhdar Brahimi | 1989-1991; 1991-1993 |
| (Angola) | Angola | Pedro de Castro van Dúnem | 1989-1992 |
| (Benin) | Benin | Théophile Nata; Théodore Holo | 1990-1991; 1991-1992 |
| (Botswana) | Botswana | Gaositwe K.T. Chiepe | 1985-1994 |
| (Burkina Faso) | Burkina Faso | Prosper Vokouma | 1989-1992 |
| (Burundi) | Burundi | Cyprien Mbonimpa | 1987-1992 |
| (Cameroon) | Cameroon | Jacques-Roger Booh-Booh | 1988-1992 |
| (Cape Verde) | Cape Verde | Silvino Manuel da Luz; Jorge Carlos Fonseca | 1981-1991; 1991-1993 |
| (Central African Republic) | Central African Republic | Laurent Gomina-Pampali | 1990-1992 |
| (Chad) | Chad | Soungui Ahmad | 1990-1992 |
| (Comoros) | Comoros | Mtara Maécha; Said Hassane Said Hachim | 1990-1991; 1991-1993 |
| (Republic of the Congo) | Congo | Antoine Ndinga Oba; Jean-Blaise Kololo | 1985-1991; 1991-1992 |
| (Djibouti) | Djibouti | Moumin Bahdon Farah | 1978-1993 |
| (Egypt) | Egypt | Ahmed Asmat Abdel-Meguid; Amr Moussa | 1984-1991; 1991-2001 |
| (Equatorial Guinea) | Equatorial Guinea | Santiago Eneme Ovono | 1990-1992 |
| (Ethiopia) | Ethiopia | Tesfaye Dinka; Tesfaye Tadesse; Seyoum Mesfin | 1989-1991; 1991; 1991-2010 |
| (Gabon) | Gabon | Ali Bongo Ondimba; Pascaline Mferri Bongo | 1989-1991; 1991-1994 |
| (The Gambia) | The Gambia | Omar Sey | 1987-1994 |
| (Ghana) | Ghana | Obed Asamoah | 1981-1997 |
| (Guinea) | Guinea | Jean Traoré | 1985-1993 |
| (Guinea-Bissau) | Guinea-Bissau | Júlio Semedo | 1984-1992 |
| (Ivory Coast) | Ivory Coast | Amara Essy | 1990-2000 |
| (Kenya) | Kenya | Wilson Ndolo Ayah | 1990-1993 |
| (Lesotho) | Lesotho | Tom Thabane; Pius Tanki Molapo | 1990-1991; 1991-1993 |
| (Liberia) | Liberia | Gabriel Bacchus Matthews | 1990-1993 |
| (Libya) | Libya | Ibrahim al-Bishari | 1990-1992 |
| (Madagascar) | Madagascar | Jean Bemananjara; Césaire Rabenoro | 1983-1991; 1991-1993 |
| (Malawi) | Malawi | Hastings Banda | 1964-1993 |
| (Mali) | Mali | N'Golo Traoré; Souleymane Sidibe | 1989-1991; 1991-1992 |
| (Mauritania) | Mauritania | Hasni Ould Didi | 1990-1992 |
| (Mauritius) | Mauritius | Jean-Claude de l'Estrac; Paul Bérenger | 1990-1991; 1991-1993 |
| (Morocco) | Morocco | Abdellatif Filali | 1985-1999 |
| (Mozambique) | Mozambique | Pascoal Mocumbi | 1987-1994 |
| (Namibia) | Namibia | Theo-Ben Gurirab | 1990-2002 |
| (Niger) | Niger | Mahamane Sani Bako; Hassan Hamidou | 1989-1991; 1991-1993 |
| (Nigeria) | Nigeria | Ike Nwachukwu | 1990-1993 |
| (Rwanda) | Rwanda | Casimir Bizimungu | 1989-1992 |
| (São Tomé and Príncipe) | São Tomé and Príncipe | Guilherme Posser da Costa; Alda Bandeira | 1990-1991; 1991-1993 |
| (Senegal) | Senegal | Seydina Oumar Sy; Djibo Leyti Kâ | 1990-1991; 1991-1993 |
| (Seychelles) | Seychelles | Danielle de St. Jorre | 1989-1997 |
| (Sierra Leone) | Sierra Leone | Abdul Karim Koroma | 1985-1992 |
| (Somalia) (Somaliland) | Somalia Somaliland | Ahmed Muhammad Aden; Muhammad Ali Hamoud Yusuf Ali Guray Sheikh Madar | 1990-1991; 1991-1992? 1991-1993 |
| (South Africa) | South Africa | Pik Botha | 1977-1994 |
| (Sudan) | Sudan | Ali Sahloul | 1989-1993 |
| (Eswatini) | Swaziland | Sir George Mbikwakhe Mamba | 1987-1993 |
| (Tanzania) | Tanzania | Ahmed Hassan Diria | 1990-1993 |
| (Togo) | Togo | Yaovi Adodo; Aboudou Tchiaka | 1987-1991; 1991-1992 |
| (Tunisia) | Tunisia | Habib Boularès; Habib Ben Yahia | 1990-1991; 1991-1997 |
| (Uganda) | Uganda | Paul Ssemogerere | 1988-1994 |
| (Western Sahara) | Western Sahara | Mohamed Salem Ould Salek | 1988-1995 |
| (Zaire) | Zaire | Mushobekwa Kalimba Wa Katana; Inonga Lokongo Lome; Ipoto Eyebu-Bakand Asi; Buketi Bukayi; Bagbeni Adeito Nzengeya | 1990-1991; 1991; 1991; 1991; 1991-1992 |
| (Zambia) | Zambia | Benjamin Mibenge; Vernon Mwaanga | 1990-1991; 1991-1994 |
| (Zimbabwe) | Zimbabwe | Nathan Shamuyarira | 1987-1995 |

== Asia ==
| Flag | Country | Foreign minister | Term |
|---|---|---|---|
| (Afghanistan) | Afghanistan | Abdul Wakil | 1986-1992 |
| (Armenia) | Armenia | Anatoly Mkrtchyan; Ashot Egiazaryan; Raffi Hovannisian | 1986-1991; 1991; 1991-1992 |
| (Azerbaijan) | Azerbaijan | Huseynagha Sadigov | 1988-1992 |
| (Bahrain) | Bahrain | Sheikh Muhammad ibn Mubarak ibn Hamad Al Khalifah | 1971-2005 |
| (Bangladesh) | Bangladesh | Fakhruddin Ahmed; A.S.M. Mostafizur Rahman | 1990-1991; 1991-1996 |
| (Bhutan) | Bhutan | Dawa Tsering | 1972-1998 |
| (Brunei) | Brunei | Pengiran Muda Mohamed Bolkiah | 1984–2015 |
| (Cambodia) | Cambodia | Hor Namhong | 1990-1993 |
| (China) | China (People's Republic) | Qian Qichen | 1988-1998 |
| (Georgia (country)) | Georgia | Giorgi Khoshtaria; Murman Omanidze | 1990-1991; 1991-1992 |
| (India) | India | Vidya Charan Shukla; Madhav Singh Solanki | 1990-1991; 1991-1992 |
| (Indonesia) | Indonesia | Ali Alatas | 1988-1999 |
| (Iran) | Iran | Ali Akbar Velayati | 1981-1997 |
| (Iraq) | Iraq | Tariq Aziz; Ahmad Husayn Khudayir as-Samarrai | 1983-1991; 1991-1992 |
| (Israel) | Israel | David Levy | 1990-1992 |
| (Japan) | Japan | Taro Nakayama; Michio Watanabe | 1989-1991; 1991-1993 |
| (Jordan) | Jordan | Marwan al-Qasim; Taher al-Masri; Abdullah Nsur; Kamel Abu Jaber | 1988-1991; 1991; 1991; 1991-1994 |
| (Kazakh Soviet Socialist Republic) | Kazakhstan | Akmaral Arystanbekova; Tuleutai Suleimenov | 1989-1991; 1991-1994 |
| (North Korea) | North Korea | Kim Yong-nam | 1983-1998 |
| (South Korea) | South Korea | Yi Sang-ok | 1990-1993 |
| (Kuwait) | Kuwait | Sheikh Sabah Al-Ahmad Al-Jaber Al-Sabah | 1978-2003 |
| (Kirghiz Soviet Socialist Republic) | Kyrgyzstan | Zhanyl Tumenbayeva; Muratbek Imanaliyev | 1989-1991; 1991-1992 |
| (Laos) | Laos | Phoune Sipraseuth | 1975-1993 |
| (Lebanon) | Lebanon | Farès Boueiz | 1990-1992 |
| (Malaysia) | Malaysia | Abu Hassan Omar; Abdullah Ahmad Badawi | 1987-1991; 1991-1999 |
| (Maldives) | Maldives | Fathulla Jameel | 1978-2005 |
| (Mongolia) | Mongolia | Tserenpiliyn Gombosüren | 1988-1996 |
| (Myanmar) | Myanmar | Saw Maung; Ohn Gyaw | 1988-1991; 1991-1998 |
| (Nepal) | Nepal | Krishna Prasad Bhattarai; Girija Prasad Koirala | 1990-1991; 1991-1994 |
| (Oman) | Oman | Yusuf bin Alawi bin Abdullah | 1982–2020 |
| (Pakistan) | Pakistan | Sahabzada Yaqub Khan; Akram Zaki; Siddiq Khan Kanju | 1988-1991; 1991; 1991-1993 |
| (Philippines) | Philippines | Raul Manglapus | 1987-1992 |
| (Qatar) | Qatar | Mubarak Ali al-Khater | 1990-1992 |
| (Saudi Arabia) | Saudi Arabia | Prince Saud bin Faisal bin Abdulaziz Al Saud | 1975–2015 |
| (Singapore) | Singapore | Wong Kan Seng | 1988-1994 |
| (Sri Lanka) | Sri Lanka | Harold Herath | 1990-1993 |
| (Syria) | Syria | Farouk al-Sharaa | 1984-2006 |
| (Taiwan) | Taiwan (Republic of China) | Fredrick Chien | 1990-1996 |
| (Tajik Soviet Socialist Republic) | Tajikistan | Lakim Kayumov | 1989-1992 |
| (Thailand) | Thailand | Arthit Ourairat; Arsa Sarasin | 1990-1991; 1991-1992 |
| (Turkey) | Turkey | Ahmet Kurtcebe Alptemoçin; Safa Giray; Hikmet Çetin | 1990-1991; 1991; 1991-1994 |
| (Turkmen Soviet Socialist Republic) | Turkmenistan | Awdy Kulyýew | 1990-1992 |
| (United Arab Emirates) | United Arab Emirates | Rashid Abdullah Al Nuaimi | 1980-2006 |
| (Uzbekistan) | Uzbekistan | Shahlo Mahmudova | 1991-1992 |
| (Vietnam) | Vietnam | Nguyễn Cơ Thạch; Nguyễn Mạnh Cầm | 1980-1991; 1991-2000 |
| (Yemen) | Yemen | Abd Al-Karim Al-Iryani | 1990-1993 |

== Australia and Oceania ==
| Flag | Country | Foreign minister | Term |
|---|---|---|---|
| (Australia) | Australia | Gareth Evans | 1988-1996 |
| (Fiji) | Fiji | Ratu Sir Kamisese Mara | 1988-1992 |
| (Kiribati) | Kiribati | Ieremia Tabai; Teatao Teannaki | 1983-1991; 1991-1994 |
| (Marshall Islands) | Marshall Islands | Tom Kijiner | 1988-1994 |
| (Federated States of Micronesia) | Micronesia | Andon Amaraich; Resio S. Moses | 1979-1991; 1991-1996 |
| (Nauru) | Nauru | Bernard Dowiyogo | 1989-1995 |
| (New Zealand) (Cook Islands) | New Zealand Cook Islands | Don McKinnon Inatio Akaruru | 1990-1999 1989-1999 |
| (Papua New Guinea) | Papua New Guinea | Sir Michael Somare | 1988-1992 |
| (Solomon Islands) | Solomon Islands | Sir Peter Kenilorea | 1990-1993 |
| (Tonga) | Tonga | Prince Tupouto'a Tungi | 1979-1998 |
| (Tuvalu) | Tuvalu | Bikenibeu Paeniu | 1989-1993 |
| (Vanuatu) | Vanuatu | Donald Kalpokas; Edward Natapei; Serge Vohor | 1987-1991; 1991; 1991-1993 |
| (Samoa) | Western Samoa | Tofilau Eti Alesana | 1988-1998 |

== Europe ==
| Flag | Country | Foreign minister | Term |
|---|---|---|---|
| (Albania) | Albania | Reis Malile; Muhamet Kapllani; Ilir Boçka | 1982-1991; 1991; 1991-1992 |
| (Austria) | Austria | Alois Mock | 1987-1995 |
| (Belarus) | Belarus | Petr Krauchenka | 1990-1994 |
| (Belgium) (Brussels) (Wallonia) | Belgium Brussels-Capital Region Wallonia | Mark Eyskens Jos Chabert Albert Liénard | 1989-1992 1989-1999 1988-1992 |
| (Bulgaria) | Bulgaria | Viktor Valkov; Stoyan Ganev | 1990-1991; 1991-1993 |
| (Croatia) | Croatia | Davorin Rudolf; Zvonimir Šeparović | 1991; 1991-1992 |
| (Cyprus) (Northern Cyprus) | Cyprus Northern Cyprus | Georgios Iacovou Kenan Atakol | 1983-1993 1985-1993 |
| (Czechoslovakia) | Czechoslovakia | Jiří Dienstbier | 1989-1992 |
| (Denmark) | Denmark | Uffe Ellemann-Jensen | 1982-1993 |
| (Estonia) | Estonia | Lennart Meri | 1990-1992 |
| (Finland) | Finland | Pertti Paasio; Paavo Väyrynen | 1989-1991; 1991-1993 |
| (France) | France | Roland Dumas | 1988-1993 |
| (Germany) | Germany | Hans-Dietrich Genscher | 1982-1992 |
| (Greece) | Greece | Antonis Samaras | 1990-1992 |
| (Hungary) | Hungary | Géza Jeszenszky | 1990-1994 |
| (Iceland) | Iceland | Jón Baldvin Hannibalsson | 1988-1995 |
| (Republic of Ireland) | Ireland | Gerry Collins | 1989-1992 |
| (Italy) | Italy | Gianni De Michelis | 1989-1992 |
| (Latvia) | Latvia | Jānis Jurkāns | 1990-1992 |
| (Liechtenstein) | Liechtenstein | Hans Brunhart | 1978-1993 |
| (Lithuania) | Lithuania | Algirdas Saudargas | 1990-1992 |
| (Luxembourg) | Luxembourg | Jacques Poos | 1984-1999 |
| (Socialist Republic of Macedonia) | Republic of Macedonia | Denko Maleski | 1991-1993 |
| (Malta) | Malta | Guido de Marco | 1989-1996 |
| (Moldova) | Moldova | Nicolae Țâu | 1990-1993 |
| (Netherlands) | Netherlands | Hans van den Broek | 1982-1993 |
| (Norway) | Norway | Thorvald Stoltenberg | 1990-1993 |
| (Poland) | Poland | Krzysztof Skubiszewski | 1989-1993 |
| (Portugal) | Portugal | João de Deus Pinheiro | 1987-1992 |
| (Romania) | Romania | Adrian Năstase | 1990-1992 |
| (Russia) (Chechen Republic of Ichkeria) | Russia Chechnya | Andrey Kozyrev Shamil Benno | 1990-1996 1991-1992 |
| (San Marino) | San Marino | Gabriele Gatti | 1986-2002 |
| (Slovenia) | Slovenia | Dimitrij Rupel | 1990-1993 |
| (Soviet Union) | Soviet Union | Eduard Shevardnadze; Aleksandr Bessmertnykh; Boris Pankin; Eduard Shevardnadze | 1985-1991; 1991; 1991; 1991 |
| (Spain) | Spain | Francisco Fernández Ordóñez | 1985-1992 |
| (Sweden) | Sweden | Sten Andersson; Margaretha af Ugglas | 1985-1991; 1991-1994 |
| (Switzerland) | Switzerland | René Felber | 1988-1993 |
| (Ukraine) | Ukraine | Anatoliy Zlenko | 1990-1994 |
| (United Kingdom) | United Kingdom | Douglas Hurd | 1989-1995 |
| (Vatican City) | Vatican City | Archbishop Jean-Louis Tauran | 1990-2003 |
| (Socialist Federal Republic of Yugoslavia) (Socialist Republic of Bosnia and Herzegovina) (Socialist Republic of Croatia) (Socialist Republic of Macedonia) (Socialist Republic of Montenegro) (Socialist Republic of Serbia) (Socialist Republic of Slovenia) | Yugoslavia Bosnia and Herzegovina Croatia SR Macedonia Montenegro Serbia Slovenia | Budimir Lončar; Milivoje Maksić Haris Silajdžić Frane Vinko Golem Denko Maleski Branko Lukovac; Nikola Samardžić Aleksandar Prlja; Branko Mikasinović; Vladislav Jovanović Dimitrij Rupel | 1987-1991; 1991-1992 1990-1993 1990-1991 1991-1993 1990-1991; 1991-1992 1989-1991; 1991; 1991-1992 1990-1993 |

== North America and the Caribbean ==
| Flag | Country | Foreign minister | Term |
|---|---|---|---|
| (Antigua and Barbuda) | Antigua and Barbuda | Lester Bird; Vere Bird; Lester Bird | 1982-1991; 1991; 1991-2004 |
| (The Bahamas) | The Bahamas | Clement T. Maynard | 1984-1992 |
| (Barbados) | Barbados | Maurice King | 1989-1993 |
| (Belize) | Belize | Said Musa | 1989-1993 |
| (Canada) (Quebec) | Canada Quebec | Joe Clark; Barbara McDougall John Ciaccia | 1984-1991; 1991-1993 1989-1994 |
| (Costa Rica) | Costa Rica | Bernd H. Niehaus Quesada | 1990-1994 |
| (Cuba) | Cuba | Isidoro Malmierca Peoli | 1976-1992 |
| (Dominica) | Dominica | Brian George Keith Alleyne | 1990-1995 |
| (Dominican Republic) | Dominican Republic | Joaquín Ricardo García; Juan Aristides Taveras Guzmán | 1988-1991; 1991-1994 |
| (El Salvador) | El Salvador | José Manuel Pacas Castro | 1989-1994 |
| (Grenada) | Grenada | Ben Jones; Nicholas Brathwaite | 1990-1991; 1991-1992 |
| (Guatemala) | Guatemala | Ariel Rivera Irias; Álvaro Arzú; Gonzalo Menéndez Park | 1989-1991; 1991; 1991-1993 |
| (Haiti) | Haiti | Paul Christian Latortue; Marie-Denise Fabien-Jean-Louis; Jean-Robert Sabalat; Jean-Robert Simonise | 1990-1991; 1991; 1991; 1991-1992 |
| (Honduras) | Honduras | Mario Carías Zapata | 1990-1994 |
| (Jamaica) | Jamaica | David Coore | 1989-1993 |
| (Mexico) | Mexico | Fernando Solana | 1988-1993 |
| (Nicaragua) | Nicaragua | Enrique Dreyfus | 1990-1992 |
| (Panama) | Panama | Julio Linares | 1989-1993 |
| (Puerto Rico) | Puerto Rico | Antonio Colorado | 1990–1992 |
| (Saint Kitts and Nevis) | Saint Kitts and Nevis | Kennedy Simmonds | 1983-1995 |
| (Saint Lucia) | Saint Lucia | Neville Cenac | 1987-1992 |
| (Saint Vincent and the Grenadines) | Saint Vincent and the Grenadines | James Fitz-Allen Mitchell | 1984-1992 |
| (Trinidad and Tobago) | Trinidad and Tobago | Sahadeo Basdeo; Ralph Maraj | 1988-1991; 1991-1995 |
| (United States) | United States | James Baker | 1989-1992 |

== South America ==
| Flag | Country | Foreign minister | Term |
|---|---|---|---|
| (Argentina) | Argentina | Domingo Cavallo; Guido di Tella | 1989-1991; 1991-1999 |
| (Bolivia) | Bolivia | Carlos Iturralde Ballivián | 1989-1992 |
| (Brazil) | Brazil | Francisco Rezek | 1990-1992 |
| (Chile) | Chile | Enrique Silva Cimma | 1990-1994 |
| (Colombia) | Colombia | Luis Fernando Jaramillo Correa; Noemí Sanín | 1990-1991; 1991-1994 |
| (Ecuador) | Ecuador | Diego Cordovez Zegers | 1988-1992 |
| (Guyana) | Guyana | Desmond Hoyte | 1990-1992 |
| (Paraguay) | Paraguay | Alexis Frutos Vaesken | 1990-1993 |
| (Peru) | Peru | Luis Marchand Stens; Raúl Sánchez Sotomayor; Carlos Torres y Torres Lara; Augusto Blacker Miller | 1990-1991; 1991; 1991; 1991-1992 |
| (Suriname) | Suriname | Robby D. Ramlakhan; Subhas Mungra | 1991; 1991-1996 |
| (Uruguay) | Uruguay | Héctor Gros Espiell | 1990-1993 |
| (Venezuela) | Venezuela | Reinaldo Figueredo | 1989-1992 |
