= 1984 Antiguan general election =

- 17 April 1984

All 17 seats in the House of Representatives 9 seats needed for a majority
- Turnout: 61.12% (▼15.96pp)
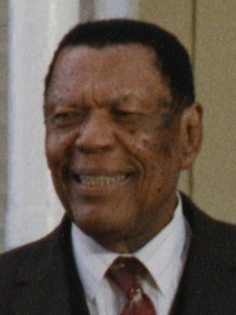

	First party	Second party
Leader	Vere Bird	–
Party	ALP	Independents
Seats won	16	1
Seat change	▲3	Steady
Popular vote	12,972	1,375
Percentage	67.90%	7.20%
Swing	▲9.86pp	▲5.68pp
- Results by constituency
Prime Minister before election
Vere Bird
ALP
Subsequent Prime Minister
Vere Bird
ALP

General elections were held in Antigua and Barbuda on 17 April 1984, the first after the country had become an independent Commonwealth realm in 1981.

The result was a victory for the governing Antigua Labour Party (ALP), whose leader Vere Bird was reelected as Prime Minister of Antigua and Barbuda. In contrast, the opposition vote was split between George Walter's new political vehicle, the United People's Movement, and the Progressive Labour Movement, Walter's former party from his pre-independence term as Premier. The only non-ALP seat was won by a pro-ALP independent from Barbuda. Voter turnout was 61.1%.

== Results ==
Party	Votes	%	Seats	+/–
Antigua Labour Party	12,972	67.90	16	+3
United People's Movement	4,401	23.04	0	New
Progressive Labour Movement	356	1.86	0	–3
Independents	1,375	7.20	1	0
Total	19,104	100.00	17	0
Valid votes	19,104	99.38		
Invalid/blank votes	119	0.62		
Total votes	19,223	100.00		
Registered voters/turnout	31,453	61.12		
Source: Nohlen
