= 1960 Antiguan general election =

- 29 November 1960

All 10 seats in the Legislative Council 6 seats needed for a majority
- Turnout: 37.98% (▼19.04pp)
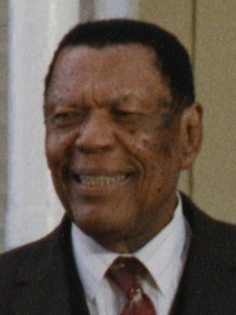
	First party
Leader	Vere Bird
Party	ALP
Seats won	10
Seat change	▲2
Popular vote	2,128
Percentage	85.02%
Swing	▼1.67pp
- Results by constituency
Chief Minister before election
Vere Bird
ALP
Subsequent Chief Minister
Vere Bird
ALP

General elections were held in Antigua and Barbuda on 29 November 1960. They were won by the governing Antigua Labour Party (ALP), whose leader Vere Bird was re-elected as Chief Minister, a position he had held since 1 January 1960 when the position was created.

The 1960 elections were the only general elections held in the territory during its membership of the West Indies Federation, a brief attempt to create a federal state in the British West Indies. Voter turnout was 38%.

== Results ==
Party	Votes	%	Seats	+/–
Antigua Labour Party	2,128	85.02	10	+2
Barbuda Democratic Movement	151	6.03	0	New
Antigua Democratic Labour Party	66	2.64	0	New
Independents	158	6.31	0	New
Total	2,503	100.00	10	+2
Valid votes	2,503	97.81		
Invalid/blank votes	56	2.19		
Total votes	2,559	100.00		
Registered voters/turnout	6,738	37.98		
Source: Nohlen
