= Sir McChesney George Secondary School =

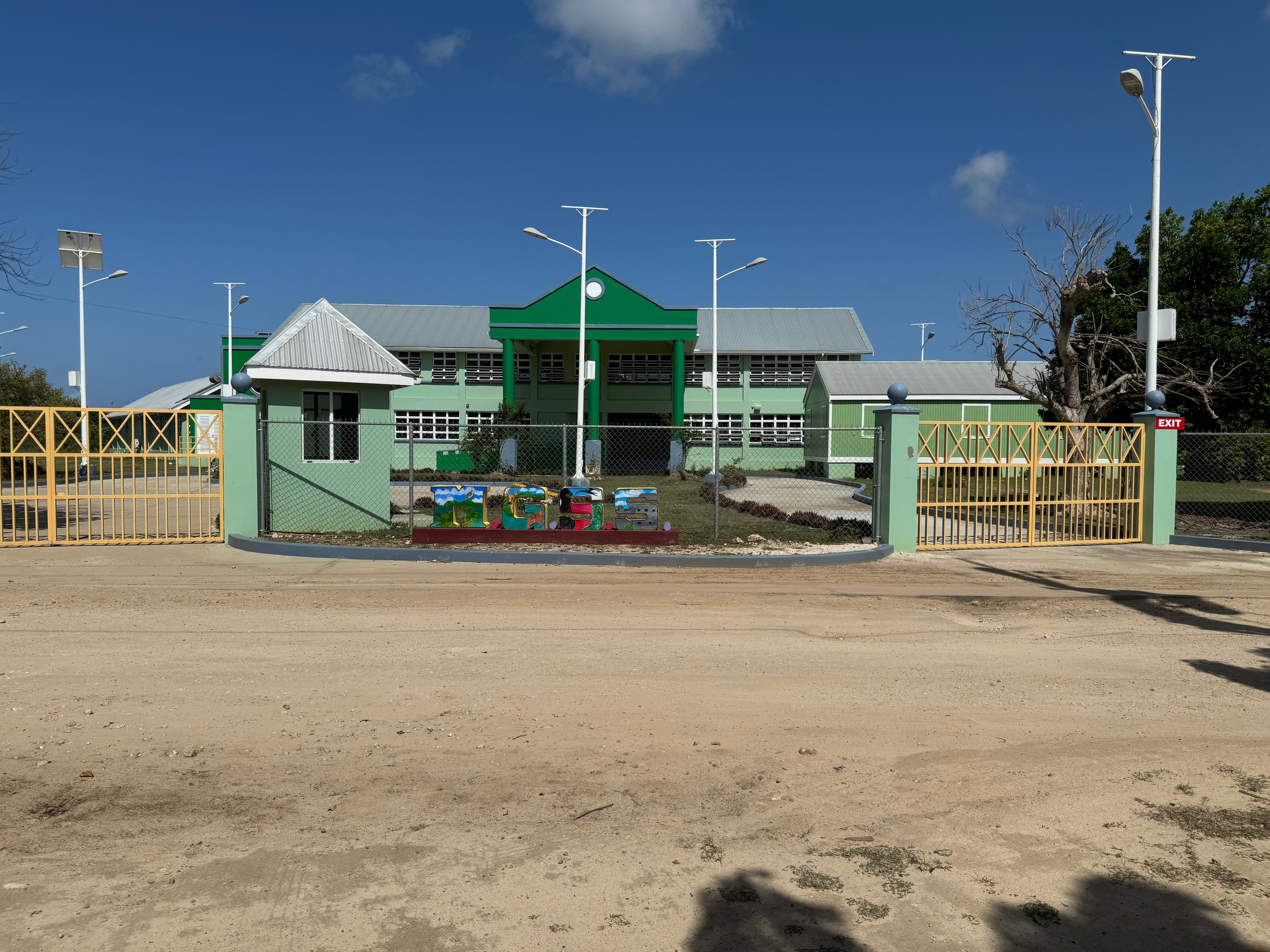
- The school in 2024

Location
- Barbuda; Antigua and Barbuda
- 17.6412°N 61.8167°W

Information
- Type: Secondary school
- Established: 2012; 14 years ago
- Principal: Rexford Harry
- Faculty: 20
- Enrollment: c. 120
- Named in honour of: Sir McChesney George

Sir McChesney George Secondary School is a secondary school on the island of Barbuda in the country of Antigua and Barbuda in the Caribbean. The principal is Rexford Harry.

The school was opened in 2012 and named in honour of Sir McChesney George, a member of the Antigua Labour Party who served as the Member for Barbuda in the Legislative Council from 1960 to 1965; and in the House of Representatives from 1965 to 1971.

On September 1, 2010, construction on a set of classrooms was completed. Following Hurricane Irma and the global COVID-19 pandemic, in September 2020 new facilities were completed including new lab spaces, retrofitting classrooms, and other changes to the main area of the school. The school includes a vegetable and fruit garden.
