= Tomlinson, Antigua and Barbuda =

Coordinates: 17°6′45.39″N 61°48′56.81″W

Tomlinson
- Village
- Tomlinsons
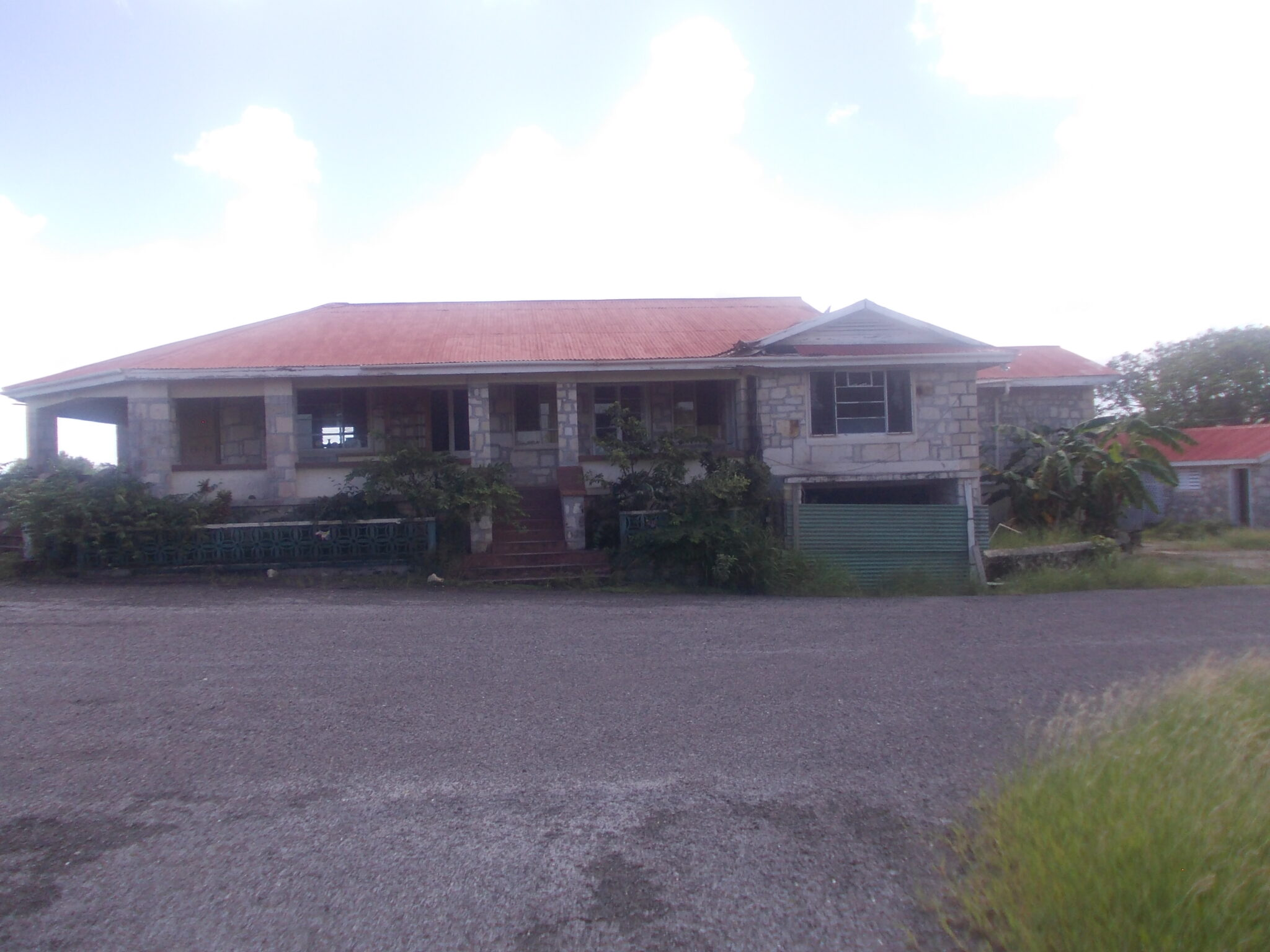
- Tomlinson House

- Location within Antigua and Barbuda
- Country: Antigua and Barbuda
- Island: Antigua
- Civil parish: Saint John Parish

Government
  - Type: Village Council (possibly dissolved)

Population (2011)
  - Total: 808
- Time zone: UTC-4 (AST)

Tomlinsons is a village in Saint John Parish, Antigua and Barbuda. Tomlinson is home to Tomlinson House, the former official residence of the Prime Minister.

== Demographics ==
Tomlinsons has two enumeration districts.

- 33301 Tomlinsons_1
- 33302 Tomlinsons_2

=== Census data (2011) ===
==== Individual ====
Q48 Ethnic	Counts	%
African descendent	722	89.34%
Caucasian/White	8	0.96%
East Indian/India	18	2.19%
Mixed (Black/White)	18	2.19%
Mixed (Other)	23	2.87%
Hispanic	4	0.55%
Other	10	1.23%
Don't know/Not stated	6	0.68%
Total	808	100.00%

Q49 Religion	Counts	%
Adventist	106	13.33%
Anglican	105	13.19%
Baptist	35	4.44%
Church of God	20	2.50%
Evangelical	20	2.50%
Jehovah Witness	10	1.25%
Methodist	36	4.58%
Moravian	72	9.03%
Nazarene	11	1.39%
None/no religion	9	1.11%
Pentecostal	118	14.86%
Rastafarian	1	0.14%
Roman Catholic	70	8.75%
Weslyan Holiness	28	3.47%
Other	63	7.92%
Don't know/Not stated	92	11.53%
Total	795	100.00%
NotApp :	13	

Q55 Internet Use	Counts	%
Yes	467	57.79%
No	306	37.84%
Don't know/Not stated	35	4.37%
Total	808	100.00%

Q61 Lived Overseas	Counts	%
Yes	39	6.80%
No	524	92.23%
Don't know/Not stated	6	0.97%
Total	569	100.00%
NotApp :	240	

Q58. Country of birth	Counts	%
Africa	2	0.27%
Other Latin or North American countries	2	0.27%
Antigua and Barbuda	569	70.36%
Other Caribbean countries	8	0.96%
Canada	4	0.55%
Other Asian countries	2	0.27%
Other European countries	4	0.55%
Dominica	45	5.60%
Dominican Republic	8	0.96%
Guyana	50	6.15%
Jamaica	35	4.37%
Monsterrat	4	0.55%
St. Kitts and Nevis	9	1.09%
St. Lucia	3	0.41%
St. Vincent and the Grenadines	7	0.82%
Trinidad and Tobago	6	0.68%
United Kingdom	6	0.68%
USA	27	3.28%
USVI United States Virgin Islands	4	0.55%
Not Stated	13	1.64%
Total	808	100.00%

Q71 Country of Citizenship 1	Counts	%
Antigua and Barbuda	666	82.38%
Other Caribbean countries	11	1.37%
Canada	3	0.41%
Other Asian and Middle Eastern countries	2	0.27%
Dominica	24	3.01%
Dominican Republic	9	1.09%
Guyana	32	3.96%
Jamaica	21	2.60%
Monsterrat	3	0.41%
St. Vincent and the Grenadines	2	0.27%
Trinidad and Tobago	3	0.41%
United Kingdom	1	0.14%
USA	14	1.78%
Other countries	9	1.09%
Not Stated	7	0.82%
Total	808	100.00%

Q71 Country of Citizenship 2 (Country of Second Citizenship)	Counts	%
Other Caribbean countries	2	2.82%
Canada	3	4.23%
Dominica	21	26.76%
Guyana	15	19.72%
Jamaica	10	12.68%
Monsterrat	3	4.23%
St. Lucia	2	2.82%
St. Vincent and the Grenadines	2	2.82%
Trinidad and Tobago	2	2.82%
United Kingdom	4	5.63%
USA	12	15.49%
Total	78	100.00%
NotApp :	730	

==== Household ====
Tomlinsons has 249 households.

Q3 Main roofing material	Counts	%
Concrete	13	5.22%
Sheet metal	214	85.94%
Shingle (asphalt)	18	7.23%
Shingle (Other)	1	0.40%
Other (inc. improvised, tarpaulin, tile)	3	1.20%
Total	249	100.00%

Q5 Type of dwelling	Counts	%
Separate house	198	79.52%
Part of a private house	2	0.80%
Flat/apartment/condo	22	8.84%
Double house/duplex	12	4.82%
Business & dwelling	3	1.20%
Other (inc. townhouse, barracks)	7	2.81%
Do not know/Not stated	5	2.01%
Total	249	100.00%

Q4 Year built	Counts	%
Before 1980	4	1.61%
1980 - 1989	9	3.61%
1990 - 1999	53	21.29%
2000 - 2006	58	23.29%
Year 2007	15	6.02%
Year 2008	6	2.41%
Year 2009	10	4.02%
Year 2010	7	2.81%
Don't Know/not stated	87	34.94%
Total	249	100.00%

Q2 Main Material of outer walls	Counts	%
Concrete	79	31.73%
Concrete/ Blocks	45	18.07%
Wood	61	24.50%
Wood and brick	3	1.20%
Wood and concrete	49	19.68%
Wood and galvanized	4	1.61%
Other (inc. improvised, stone, stone and brick)	7	2.81%
Don't know/not stated	1	0.40%
Total	249	100.00%

Q23 3a Desktop Computer	Counts	%
Yes	106	42.57%
No	140	56.22%
Not Stated	3	1.20%
Total	249	100.00%

Q11 Garbage disposal	Counts	%
Garbage truck Private	1	0.40%
Garbage truck Public	247	99.20%
Other (inc. burning, burying, compost, dumping)	1	0.40%
Total	249	100.00%

Q7 Land tenure	Counts	%
Leasehold	3	1.20%
Owned/Freehold	158	63.45%
Rented	20	8.03%
Rented free	9	3.61%
Other (inc. permission to work land, sharecropping, squatted)	1	0.40%
Don't know/not stated	58	23.29%
Total	249	100.00%

Q6 Type of ownership	Counts	%
Owned with mortgage	95	38.15%
Owned outright	75	30.12%
Rent free	2	0.80%
Rented Private	47	18.88%
Other (inc. leased, rented Gov., squatted)	1	0.40%
Do not know/Not stated	29	11.65%
Total	249	100.00%

Q23 3b Laptop Computer	Counts	%
Yes	107	42.97%
No	139	55.82%
Not Stated	3	1.20%
Total	249	100.00%

Q12 Main source of water	Counts	%
Private, piped into dwelling	12	4.82%
Public standpipe	3	1.20%
Public piped into dwelling	212	85.14%
Public piped into dwelling	15	6.02%
Cistern/tank	5	2.01%
Other (inc. private not into dwelling, well/tank, spring/river)	2	0.80%
Total	249	100.00%

Q23 9 Mobile Device	Counts	%
Yes	230	92.37%
No	16	6.43%
Not Stated	3	1.20%
Total	249	100.00%

Q24 Motor Vehicles	Counts	%
0	56	23.73%
1	122	51.69%
2	45	19.07%
3	9	3.81%
4 or more	4	1.69%
Total	236	100.00%
Missing :	13	

Q25 4 Internet access	Counts	%
No	121	48.59%
Yes	115	46.18%
Don't know/not declared	13	5.22%
Total	249	100.00%

Q23 10 Radio	Counts	%
Yes	179	71.89%
No	67	26.91%
Not Stated	3	1.20%
Total	249	100.00%

Q27 Crime Reported	Counts	%
Yes	9	81.82%
No	1	9.09%
Don't know/Not stated	1	9.09%
Total	11	100.00%
NotApp :	238	
