= Barbuda Independence Movement (political party) =

Political party in Antigua and Barbuda

The Barbuda Independence Movement was a political party in Antigua and Barbuda. The party was formed in 1988 by Arthur Nibbs. It participated in the 1989 general elections, but received only 71 votes (0.3% of the total) and failed to win a seat. It did not contest another election.
