= Winston Derrick =

Antiguan journalist

Winston Derrick (1951 – February 2, 2013) was an Antiguan journalist, media personality, and chairman and managing director of Antigua's Observer Group of Companies which he founded in 1993 with his brother Fergie Derrick. Derrick was the host of the popular "The Voice of the People" daily call-in news show on the media group's radio station Observer Radio 911 FM.

== Career ==
In 1993, Derrick founded the Observer Media Group with his brother, Fergie Derrick, starting with a daily newspaper. In 1996, the empire expanded to Observer Radio which, at the time, was the first independent radio station in Antigua and Barbuda. Before its emergence, the government-owned Antigua Broadcasting Station (ABS) and Bird family owned ZDK (pronounced zed-ee-kay) were the only radio stations on the island. According to reporting from the Committee to Project Journalists, the radio station faced repeated threats and sabotage from the Antiguan government led by Lester Bird at the time:

Winston and Samuel Derrick, editor and publisher, respectively, of The Daily Observer, intended to crack that monopoly in 1996 when they created the independent station Observer Radio. But the government shut it down the day after the station began broadcasting. After winning a November 2000 appeal from the Privy Council in the United Kingdom, which acts as the final appellate court for countries within the British Commonwealth, the Derrick brothers were finally able to open their station on April 15, 2001. Observer Radio, which airs many call-in shows, quickly became immensely popular; estimates say that 75 to 80 percent of the country's radio listeners tune in to the station. The Derrick brothers reported significant government harassment. Samuel Derrick told CPJ that government officials often stop by the radio station to tell the brothers that their station will be closed. Recently, the government began broadcasting one of its shows on a frequency close to the one used by Observer Radio; since the government station has a more powerful transmitter, Observer Radio's signal is often disrupted. “They try to drown us out,” Derrick remarked. “Other than publicize it, there's not much we can do.”

Derrick was interviewed by international publications regarding Antiguan and Barbudan affairs over the course of his career – particularly regarding the Allen Stanford saga.

== Death ==
Derrick died suddenly after drinking with friends at local restaurant Russell's in Fort James, Antigua at the age of 62.
