= United National Democratic Party =

Antiguan political party

The United National Democratic Party was a political party in Antigua and Barbuda.

It was established in 1986 as a merger between Ivor Heath's National Democratic Party and the United People's Movement (UPM) of George Walter. Ivor Heath was named the leader of the party, and the UPM's Baldwin Spencer as his deputy.

It contested the 1989 general elections, winning 31% of the vote but only one seat (Baldwin Spencer). In 1992 it was one of three opposition parties to merge into the United Progressive Party.
