= Algernon Watts =

Antiguan politician

Algernon Watts MP

Member of the House of Representatives of Antigua and Barbuda
- In office 18 January 2023 – 1 April 2026
- Preceded by: Dean Jonas
- Constituency: St. George

Personal details
- Party: United Progressive Party

Algernon Watts is an Antiguan United Progressive Party politician, who was elected as Member of Parliament for St. George in the general election held on 18 January 2023. He resides in Mount Joy and is the publisher and editor of the Antigua Observer.
