= 1980 Antiguan general election =

- 24 April 1980

All 17 seats in the House of Representatives 9 seats needed for a majority
- Turnout: 77.08% (▼17.89pp)
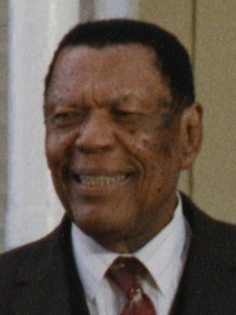

	First party	Second party
Leader	Vere Bird	Robert Hall
Party	ALP	PLM
Seats won	13	3
Seat change	▲2	▼2
Popular vote	12,794	8,654
Percentage	58.04%	39.26%
Swing	▲9.03pp	▼10.61pp
- Results by constituency
Premier before election
Vere Bird
ALP
Subsequent Premier
Vere Bird
ALP

General elections were held in Antigua and Barbuda on 24 April 1980. They were won by the governing Antigua Labour Party. ALP leader Vere Bird was re-elected as Prime Minister of Antigua and Barbuda. Voter turnout was 77.1%.

They were the last elections before Antigua and Barbuda's independence as a Commonwealth realm in 1981.

== Results ==
Party	Votes	%	Seats	+/–
Antigua Labour Party	12,794	58.04	13	+2
Progressive Labour Movement	8,654	39.26	3	–2
Antigua Caribbean Liberation Movement	259	1.18	0	New
Independents	335	1.52	1	0
Total	22,042	100.00	17	0
Valid votes	22,042	98.93		
Invalid/blank votes	238	1.07		
Total votes	22,280	100.00		
Registered voters/turnout	28,906	77.08		
Source: Nohlen
