= George Walter =

Premier of Antigua and Barbuda from 1971 to 1976

Sir George Walter
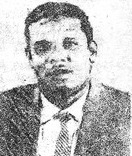

2nd Premier of Antigua
- In office 14 February 1971 – 1 February 1976
- Monarch: Elizabeth II
- Governor: Sir Wilfred Jacobs
- Preceded by: Vere Bird
- Succeeded by: Vere Bird

Leader of the Opposition
- In office 1976–1979
- Preceded by: Ernest Williams
- Succeeded by: Robert Hall

Leader of the Opposition
- In office 1970–1971
- Preceded by: Robert Hall
- Succeeded by: Ernest Williams

Personal details
- Born: 8 September 1928
- Died: 4 March 2008 (aged 79)
- Party: Progressive Labour Movement; United People's Movement

Sir George Herbert Walter, KNH (8 September 1928 – 4 March 2008) was an Antiguan politician of the Progressive Labour Movement and Premier of Antigua and Barbuda from 14 February 1971 to 1 February 1976.

== Political career ==
Born 1928, Walter was the second premier of Antigua and Barbuda, the founder of the Antigua Workers' Union (AWU) and the Progressive Labour Movement (PLM) and a former general-secretary of the Antigua Trades & Labour Union (AT&LU).

Walter founded AWU, and also Progressive Labour Movement in 1968. He won Premiership in the 1971 elections, defeating Vere Bird four years after the colony became a British dependency with domestic autonomy. He advocated full independence for Antigua and Barbuda and opposed a British proposal to make Antigua and Barbuda an island federation. The PLM headed the government from 1971 to 1976. During his tenure as premier of Antigua and Barbuda, Walter was the representative of All Saints, which was then one constituency. The Social Security Act, the Labour Code that was copied in every Caribbean territory, the Representation of the People's Act and the founding of the Antigua & Barbuda Development Bank were all the work of his PLM government.

He was defeated in the 1976 elections by Bird. After his premiership he was appointed as leader of the opposition from 1976 to 1979. He was imprisoned for corruption in 1979, but was released on appeal in 1980.

He was forced out of the party in 1982, and formed United People's Movement (UPM) in the same year. He contested the 1984 elections, but did not win a seat. After the UPM merged with another party to form the United National Democratic Party, Walter withdrew from politics.

== Arrest ==
After being defeated, Walter was convicted of allegedly selling metal illegally to the Antiguan government. He was imprisoned for three months whilst his rivals came up with a case against him. It was successfully appealed to the West Indies Court of Appeal, which ruled it groundless.He then continued selling metal and $1 high leaf to country people

== Personal life ==
He was married to Lady Hyacinth Walter, a former teacher and principal of the Antigua Girls' School, who contested the All Saints seat in 1980 on behalf of her husband, narrowly losing to then ALP member of Parliament Hilroy Humphreys by nine votes.

They had four children Sharon Walter, Paul Walter, Senator Gregory Walter and Vaughn Walter.

George Walter died on 4 March 2008, aged 79, in St. John's. His cause of death was stated by his younger brother Selvyn to be a heart attack. George Walter had been hospitalised for about a week. He was interred at Tomlinson House.

In 2008, he was posthumously made a Knight of the Order of the National Hero (KNH) by his native country Antigua and Barbuda, becoming the country's fifth national hero.

Political offices
Preceded by Sir Vere Cornwall Bird	Prime Ministers of Antigua and Barbuda; 14 February 1971 – 1 February 1976	Succeeded by Sir Vere Cornwall Bird
Preceded by Sir Vere Cornwall Bird	Finance Minister of Antigua and Barbuda; 1971–1974	Succeeded by Sydney U. Prince
