= Bobby Margetson =

Antiguan-Montserratian musician

"God Bless Antigua"
Patriotic song composed and written by Margetson

Robert "Bobby" Margetson was an Antiguan-Montserratian musician, play director, and broadcaster who is known for composing "God Bless Antigua", one of the country's most notable patriotic songs. He was born in 1928 in the presidency of Montserrat. His father moved to Antigua in 1947, whom he followed. After several years in England, he returned to Antigua with his wife in 1965. Margetson's career as a broadcaster was quite eventful. In 1968, Margetson was forced to leave Antigua following broadcast statements he made about the government. At the time, he was in the state on a work permit. He eventually appealed to the supreme court which determined that the imposition of a work permit on him and his removal from the island was unconstitutional. After his return to the country, he was the host of local game show Top of the Form on ABS TV.
