= Barbuda Democratic Movement =

Barbudan political party

The Barbuda Democratic Movement was a political party in Antigua and Barbuda. It contested the general elections in 1960 and 1989, but on both occasions received fewer than 160 votes and failed to win a seat.
