= 1965 Antiguan general election =

- 29 November 1965

All 10 seats in the Legislative Council 6 seats needed for a majority
- Turnout: 42.8%
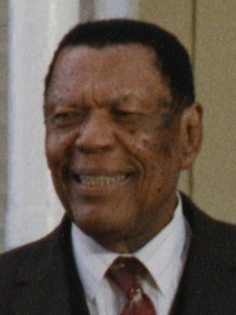
	First party
Leader	Vere Bird
Party	ALP
Seats won	10
Seat change	Steady
Popular vote	7,275
Percentage	78.88%
Swing	▼6.14pp
- Results by constituency
Chief Minister before election
Vere Bird
ALP
Subsequent Chief Minister
Vere Bird
ALP

General elections were held in Antigua and Barbuda on 29 November 1965, and continued on 15 December after three candidates withdrew before the original date. They were won by the governing Antigua Labour Party (ALP), whose leader Vere Bird was re-elected as Chief Minister.

Six ALP candidates ran unopposed, meaning the party had won the elections before a vote was cast. Voter turnout was 42.8%.

== Results ==
Party	Votes	%	Seats	+/–
Antigua Labour Party	7,275	78.88	10	0
Antigua and Barbuda Democratic Movement	1,859	20.16	0	0
Independents	89	0.96	0	0
Total	9,223	100.00	10	0
Registered voters/turnout	21,525	–		
Source: Nohlen
