= 1971 Antiguan general election =

- 11 February 1971

All 17 seats in the House of Representatives 9 seats needed for a majority
- Turnout: 55.92%
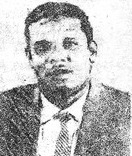

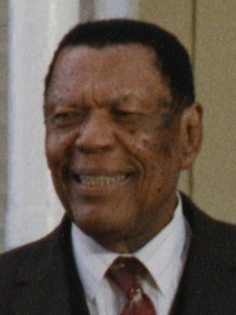
	First party	Second party
Leader	George Walter	Vere Bird
Party	PLM	ALP
Seats won	13	4
Seat change	New	▼6
Popular vote	9,761	6,409
Percentage	57.72%	37.90%
Swing	New	▼47.12pp
- Results by constituency
Premier before election
Vere Bird
ALP
Subsequent Premier
George Walter
PLM

General elections were held in Antigua and Barbuda on 11 February 1971. They were won by the Progressive Labour Movement. PLM leader George Walter was elected Premier of Antigua, defeating the incumbent Premier Vere Bird of the Antigua Labour Party. The PLM was founded in 1967 after a split in the leadership of the Antigua Trades and Labour Union; this was its first election, as well as its first and only electoral victory.

The 1971 election marked the first change of government in the history of Antigua and Barbuda. It was the first election held in the territory since its creation as a West Indies Associated State in 1967 and the end of its period under British colonial rule. Voter turnout was 56.4%.

== Results ==
Party	Votes	%	Seats	+/–
Progressive Labour Movement	9,761	57.72	13	New
Antigua Labour Party	6,409	37.90	4	–6
Antigua People's Party	595	3.52	0	New
Independents	147	0.87	0	0
Total	16,912	100.00	17	+7
Valid votes	16,912	97.71		
Invalid/blank votes	397	2.29		
Total votes	17,309	100.00		
Registered voters/turnout	30,952	55.92		
Source: Caribbean Elections
