= Hilbourne Frank =

Antigua and Barbuda politician (1931–2020)

Sir Thomas Hilbourne Frank

3rd Chairperson of the Barbuda Council
- In office 1979–1985
- Preceded by: McChesney George
- Succeeded by: Arthur Nibbs
- In office 1989–1997
- Preceded by: Emmanuel Punter
- Succeeded by: Arthur Nibbs

Personal details
- Born: 6 December 1931
- Died: 29 March 2020 (aged 88) Codrington, Barbuda
- Party: Barbuda People's Movement
- Occupation: Politician

Sir Thomas Hilbourne Frank (6 December 1931 - 29 March 2020) was a politician from Antigua and Barbuda. He was a political leader of the Barbuda People's Movement, which favours greater independence of Barbuda from Antigua and supports the United Progressive Party.

He served as Chairman of the Barbuda Council on two occasions – from 1979 to 1985 and from 1989 to 1997. He also served as Barbuda's sole member of the House of Representatives of Antigua and Barbuda between 1989 and 2004. In 2004, he retired as a legislator; he was knighted later that year.

During the independence era, Frank hoped to block Antigua and Barbuda's membership bid to join the United Nations. Frank also hoped to make Barbuda a UN trust territory or a part of another sovereign state.

He died on March 29, 2020, at age 88, in Codrington, Barbuda.
