= Arthur Nibbs =

Antiguan politician

4th Chairperson of the Barbuda Council
- In office 1985–1987
- Preceded by: Hilbourne Frank
- Succeeded by: Emmanuel Punter
- In office 1997 – April 2001
- Preceded by: Hilbourne Frank
- Succeeded by: Fabian Jones
- In office March 2013 – 31 March 2015
- Preceded by: Kelvin Punter
- Succeeded by: David Shaw

Personal details
- Born: Barbuda
- Party: Antigua Labour Party
- Education: Holy Trinity School and the Antigua Grammar School
- Occupation: Politician from Antigua and Barbuda; Assistant air traffic controller at V C Bird International Airport; Personnel manager at the K Club; President of the Barbuda Fisherman's Co-operative Society
- Known for: founding various Barbudan political parties

Arthur Nibbs is a politician from Antigua and Barbuda. He represented the Antigua Labour Party in both chambers of Parliament at various times. Born in Barbuda, he was educated at the Holy Trinity School and the Antigua Grammar School.

== Political career ==
He first stood, unsuccessfully, for election to the Barbuda Council in 1977, but was returned in the 1979 polls. He was a member of the delegation which took part in the 1980 talks with Sir Stanley Arthur, the UK Government Representative in the Caribbean, at Lancaster House on independence for Antigua and Barbuda. His mandate was to argue against a joint state between the two islands.

In 1988, Nibbs founded the Barbuda Independence Movement.

Nibbs has served as Chairman of the Barbuda Council between 1985–1989, 1997–1999 and 1999–2000. He has also served two terms in the Senate, and when he stood for the House of Representatives of Antigua and Barbuda in 2004 was the subject of a tied vote. Both he and his opponent from the Barbuda People's Movement (an ally of United Progressive Party) each received 400 votes. A by-election was held on April 20 in which Trevor Walker of BPM was elected with 408 votes against 394 for Nibbs.

In 2009 Arthur Nibbs contested the Barbuda seat once again running against Trevor Walker where he lost by one vote to Walker. Nibbs unsuccessfully contested the 2025 Barbuda Council election.

== Non-political career ==
Outside the political sphere he worked as an assistant air traffic controller at V. C. Bird International Airport on Antigua, and a personnel manager at the K Club. He is also President of the Barbuda Fisherman's Co-operative Society, and a part-time fisherman.

== Political beliefs ==
- Believes in Caribbean integration
- Believes in the co-operative movement
- Interested in organic farming
