= Antigua Workers' Union =

Antigua and Barbuda Workers' Union
- Abbreviation: ABWU
- Founded: 1967
- Headquarters: St. John's, Antigua and Barbuda
- Location: Antigua and Barbuda
- Key people: Senator David Massiah, general secretary
- Affiliations: ITUC
- Website: abwunion.com

The Antigua Workers' Union (AWU), now the Antigua and Barbuda Workers's Union (ABWU), is a national trade union centre of Antigua and Barbuda. It was formed in 1967 after a split from the ATLU. The AWU created the Progressive Labour Movement (UPP) in 1970.

The AWU is led by Senator David Massiah as general secretary. Senator Chester Hughes is president of the union.

The first president of the Antigua Workers' Union was Malcolm Daniel.

== See also ==
- List of trade unions
