= Jacqui Quinn-Leandro =

Antigua and Barbuda politician (born 1965)

Jacqui Quinn-Leandro (born 1965) is a communications specialist from Antigua. She was the first woman to be elected to the Lower House of Parliament for Antigua and Barbuda. In 2005, she served as the first female acting prime minister of Antigua and Barbuda during a temporary absence of Prime Minister Baldwin Spencer. After two terms as a Member of Parliament, she was appointed as senator.

== Biography ==
Jacqui Quinn-Leandro was born on 20 November 1965 in the village of New Winthropes, St. George Parish, Antigua. She attended the Holy Trinity School, Golden Grove Primary, Five Islands Primary School, Ottos Comprehensive and the Antigua Girls' High School. She graduated with a bachelor's degree with honours from the University of the West Indies and went on to earn a master's degree in Latin American and Caribbean Studies from the University of Cambridge in England. Quinn-Leandro completed her Doctorate of Philosophy in Communications at McGill University in Montreal, Quebec, Canada.

After completing her education, Quinn-Leandro returned to Antigua, working as the news anchor of Antigua & Barbuda Broadcasting Service (ABS) Television and head of news and current affairs from 1986 to 1997. She then served as the Human Resource and Marketing Officer of the Antigua & Barbuda Investment Bank (ABIA). Later, Quinn-Leandro began working as a communications consultant for such organizations as the Caribbean Family Planning Affiliation, the Antigua Commercial Bank and the Hadeed Corporate Group. In 2004, she represented the United Progressive Party and won the seat as a Member of Parliament for the St. George Constituency and became the first woman to be elected to the country's Lower House of Parliament. She was appointed as Minister of Information and Public Administration. In 2005, she served as the first female acting prime minister of Antigua and Barbuda during a temporary absence of Prime Minister Baldwin Spencer. Between 2006 and 2008, she served as president of the Inter-American Commission of Women (CIM), a Pan-American organization which focuses on gender equality and the rights of women. In 2009, she was re-elected as MP, carrying over 57% of the vote in her district and was appointed to serve as the Minister of Education, Youth and Gender Affairs. Though she lost her 2014 re-election bid, Quinn-Leandro was appointed to serve the 2014 term in the Upper House of Parliament as a Senator.

In 2012, Quinn-Leandro was diagnosed with breast cancer. She underwent surgery to remove two lumps and an eight-month treatment regime before being declared cancer-free and returning to work. She is the mother of two children.

In 2021 she faced a bizarre trial with the accusation of conversion, corruption and embezzlement of buses that ended with the prosecutor's office closing the case.
