= Progressive Labour Movement =

Antiguan political party

The Progressive Labour Movement was a major centre-left political party in Antigua and Barbuda and, until the 2000s, was the only political party to have defeated the Antigua Labour Party in an election.

== History ==
The party was established in 1968 under the leadership of George Walter and Donald Halstead, emerging from the Antigua Workers' Union, which had been established in 1967 as a breakaway from the Antigua Labour Party-affiliated Antigua Trades and Labour Union. In the 1971 election, it won 57.7% of the vote and 13 of the 17 seats in the House of Representatives, the first time the Antigua Labour Party had lost an election. Walter became Prime Minister.

A series of corruption scandals involving PLM ministers, together with a severe economic downturn caused by the Oil Shock, led to a drop in support for the PLM. Nevertheless, it still won a plurality of votes in the 1976 elections. However, despite receiving the most votes, it won only five seats, whilst the ALP won 11.

In the 1980 elections, the party lost more support, and won only three seats. A further slump saw them lose their parliamentary representation following the 1984 elections, in which they received only 356 votes.

It did not contest the 1989 elections and, in 1992 it was one of three parties that merged to form the United Progressive Party.

== Electoral results ==
=== House of Representatives ===
| Election | Party leader | Votes | % | Seats | +/– | Position | Government |
|---|---|---|---|---|---|---|---|
| 1971 | George Walter | 9,761 | 57.72 | 13 / 17 | ▲13 | ▲1st | Majority |
| 1976 | George Walter | 12,268 | 49.87 | 5 / 17 | ▼8 | ▼2nd | Opposition |
| 1980 | Robert Hall | 8,654 | 39.26 | 3 / 17 | ▼2 | 2nd | Opposition |
| 1984 | Robert Hall | 356 | 1.86 | 0 / 17 | ▼3 | ▼3rd | Extra-parliamentary |
