= Vere Bird =

Leader of Antigua and Barbuda (1960–1971; 1976–1994)

The Right Honourable Sir Vere Bird KNH
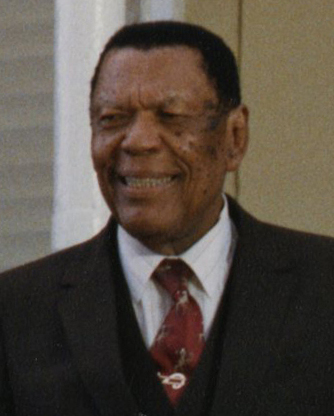
- Bird in 1986

1st Prime Minister of Antigua and Barbuda
- In office 1 November 1981 – 9 March 1994
- Monarch: Elizabeth II
- Governors-General: Wilfred Jacobs; Sir James Carlisle
- Preceded by: Himself (as Premier)
- Succeeded by: Lester Bird

1st Premier of Antigua
- In office 29 February 1976 – 1 November 1981
- Monarch: Elizabeth II
- Governor: Wilfred Jacobs
- Preceded by: George Walter
- Succeeded by: Himself (as Prime Minister)
- In office 27 February 1967 – 14 February 1971
- Monarch: Elizabeth II
- Governor: Wilfred Jacobs
- Preceded by: Himself (as Chief Minister)
- Succeeded by: George Walter

Chief Minister of Antigua
- In office 1 January 1960 – 27 February 1967
- Monarch: Elizabeth II
- Governor: Ian Turbott; David Rose
- Preceded by: Position established
- Succeeded by: Himself (as Premier)

Personal details
- Born: 9 December 1909 St. John's, Presidency of Antigua
- Died: 28 June 1999 (aged 89) St. John's, Antigua and Barbuda
- Party: Labour

Sir Vere Cornwall Bird KNH (9 December 1909 – 28 June 1999) was an Antiguan politician who was the first Prime Minister of Antigua and Barbuda. His son, Lester Bryant Bird, succeeded him as prime minister. In 1994, he was declared a "National Hero".

Bird was an officer in the Salvation Army for two years. In 1943, he became the president of the Antigua Trades and Labour Union. He achieved national acclaim politically for the first time when he was elected to the colonial legislature in 1945. He formed the Antigua Labour Party and led it to victory in the territory's first elections, in 1954. He served as head of government for all but one term from 1960 to 1981 (titled as chief minister from 1960 to 1967, and as premier from 1967 to 1971 and from 1976 to 1981. When Antigua and Barabuda gained independence in 1981, he became its first prime minister from 1981 to 1994. His resignation was due to failing health and internal issues within the government.

== Early life and education ==
Bird was born in a poor area of St John's, the capital. Unlike most of his political contemporaries – such as Norman Manley of Jamaica and Sir Grantley Herbert Adams of Barbados, who were distinguished lawyers, and Trinidadian Eric Williams, a scholar – Bird had little formal education except primary schooling. He attended St John's Boys School, now known as the T.N. Kirnon Primary School.

== Political career ==
=== Positions in Antigua ===
Bird was an officer in the Salvation Army for two years interspersing his interests in trade unionism and politics. He gave up the Salvation Army because he saw the way the landowners were treating the local black Antiguans and Barbudans, so he decided to leave his post to fight for the freedom of his people.

When the Antigua Trades and Labour Union (ATLU) was formed in 1939, Bird was an executive member. By 1943 he had become president of the union and was leading a battle for better working conditions and increased pay against the white sugar barons. The union entered electoral politics for the first time in 1946 and Bird won, in a by-election, a seat in the legislature and was appointed a member of the Executive Council.

When universal adult suffrage was introduced here in 1951, the ATLU, under the banner of the Antigua Labour Party, won all seats in the legislature, a feat it repeated until 1967, making Antigua a country with a multi-party system but with freely voted one-party control. The ministerial system was introduced in 1956 and the Governor gave Bird the trade and production portfolio, and when further constitutional advancement came in 1960, he was named Chief Minister.

In 1967, Antigua became the first Eastern Caribbean island to receive the associated statehood constitution from Britain that gave internal self-government but with London remaining responsible for foreign policy and defence.

Bird, radical in his younger days, had been shifting to the right, and in the face of severe social unrest that forced a split in the ATLU in 1967 and rioting in 1968, the ATLU lost its tight hold of Antigua and Barbuda politics. Out of the split, the Antigua Workers Union was formed and later the Progressive Labour Movement (PLM), and Bird decided to resign because he felt it was not right to hold both positions.

In 1968 the PLM won four seats in a by-election and by 1971 Bird was out of power, having not only lost the government to the PLM but also the parliamentary seat he had held for 25 years. A former Lieutenant, the PLM's George Walter, became the island's new premier.

Bird's political exile was to last for only five years and by 1976, he regained the government, having campaigned against independence on the grounds that Antigua was not yet psychologically ready. He won the election again in 1980, this time with independence being a major campaign plank. With his powerful family, he ruled Antigua and Barbuda up to 1994, when he quit politics, having paved the way for one of his sons, Lester, to take over as prime minister.

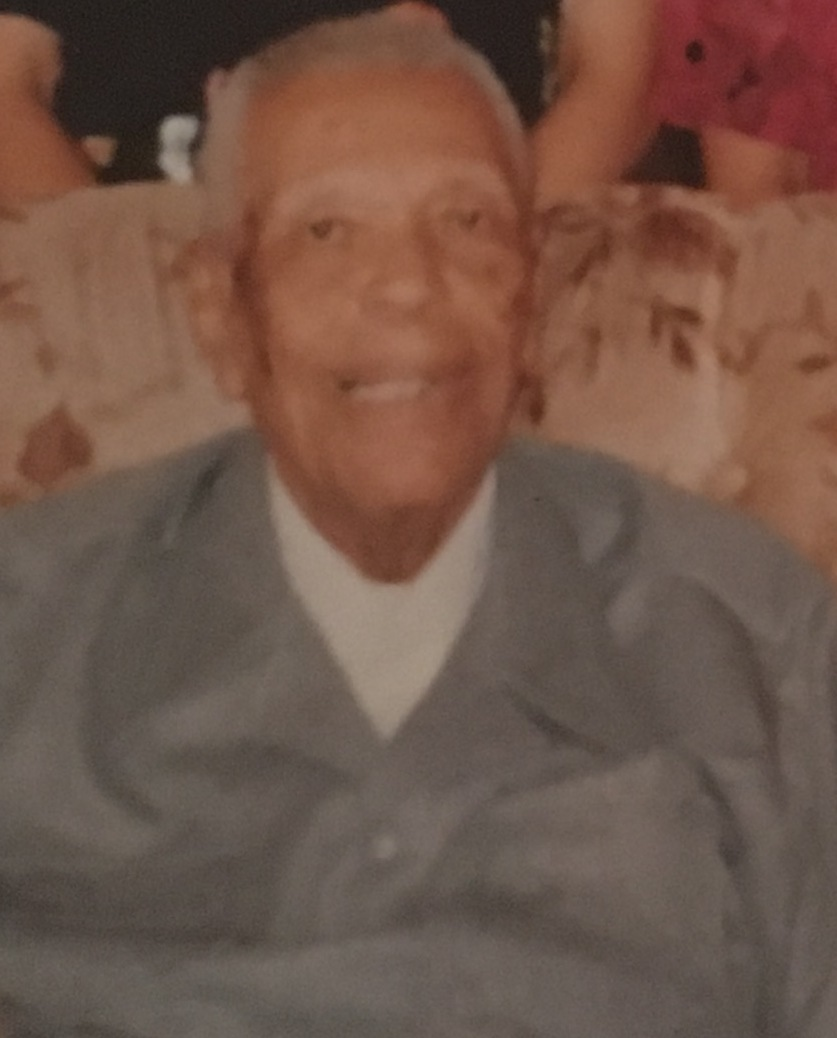
Bird in later life

- Chief Minister of Antigua from 1 January 1960 to 27 February 1967
- Premier of Antigua from 27 February 1967 to 14 February 1971
- Premier of Antigua from 1 February 1976 to 1 November 1981
- Prime Minister of Antigua and Barbuda from 1 November 1981 to 9 March 1994.

=== Criticism and praise ===
A common criticism from the Antiguan public is the corruption and cronyism within the Labour Party, with many claiming the government is essentially a "family business" with the continuance of the Bird dynasty in control of political power as unquestioned.

Bird's supporters reject these accusations and say that his actions were justified to throw off the institution of colonial sugar planters and the British colonial overlords. The Antiguan author Jamaica Kincaid compared the Bird government to the François Duvalier dictatorship in Haiti in her politically charged narrative A Small Place.

Bird was a member of an elite group of militant trade unionists who blazed a trail through colonial times up to or near the political independence of the Caribbean countries. The group included Alexander Bustamante and Norman Manley of Jamaica, Robert Bradshaw of St Kitts and Nevis, Grantley Adams of Barbados, Cheddi Jagan of Guyana, Ebenezer Joshua of St Vincent and the Grenadines and Eric Gairy of Grenada. Bird was among the early organizers of labour in colonial Antigua and Barbuda of the 1930s and 1940s. His biggest battles were fought in the sugar industry, where he achieved better wages for workers and recognition of the right of workers to have annual holidays with pay.

Bird, an imposing figure (standing at 7 feet tall) even in his last years, was astute enough to recognise that those benefits would be limited as long as the big landowners held control of the government. Therefore, he actively encouraged the top executive of his union – the Antigua Trades and Labour Union – to run for legislative office. He agitated for a change in the qualification of candidates for the parliamentary elections since up to that time, only property owners could run for election.

Bird won a seat to parliament in the late 1940s and his party went on to dominate electoral politics in Antigua and Barbuda for several years. He was eventually to lead the islands into political independence from Britain. Bird left his mark on the labour movement, education and the Caribbean integration movement. One of Bird's dreams was a Caribbean that was united politically and economically. Bird ardently supported the West Indies Federation and when that collapsed in 1962, negotiated hard for a federation of the "Little Eight" countries.

In 1965, together with premiers Errol Barrow of Barbados and Forbes Burnham of Guyana, Bird brought the Caribbean Free Trade Association (CARIFTA) into being. That Association later led to the Caribbean Community and Common Market (Caricom), comprising 12 of the English-speaking Caribbean countries, two more than were members of the West Indies Federation.

On 1 November 1981, he became the first Prime minister of Antigua and Barbuda. Since then, in a rare case in modern-day Caribbean politics, he led his party to an election victory in 1984 in which the Antigua Labour Party (ALP) won all the Antiguan seats in the Legislature.

== Awards ==
In 1994, Bird was made a Knight of the Order of the National Hero (KNH) by his native country Antigua and Barbuda.

== Death and legacy ==
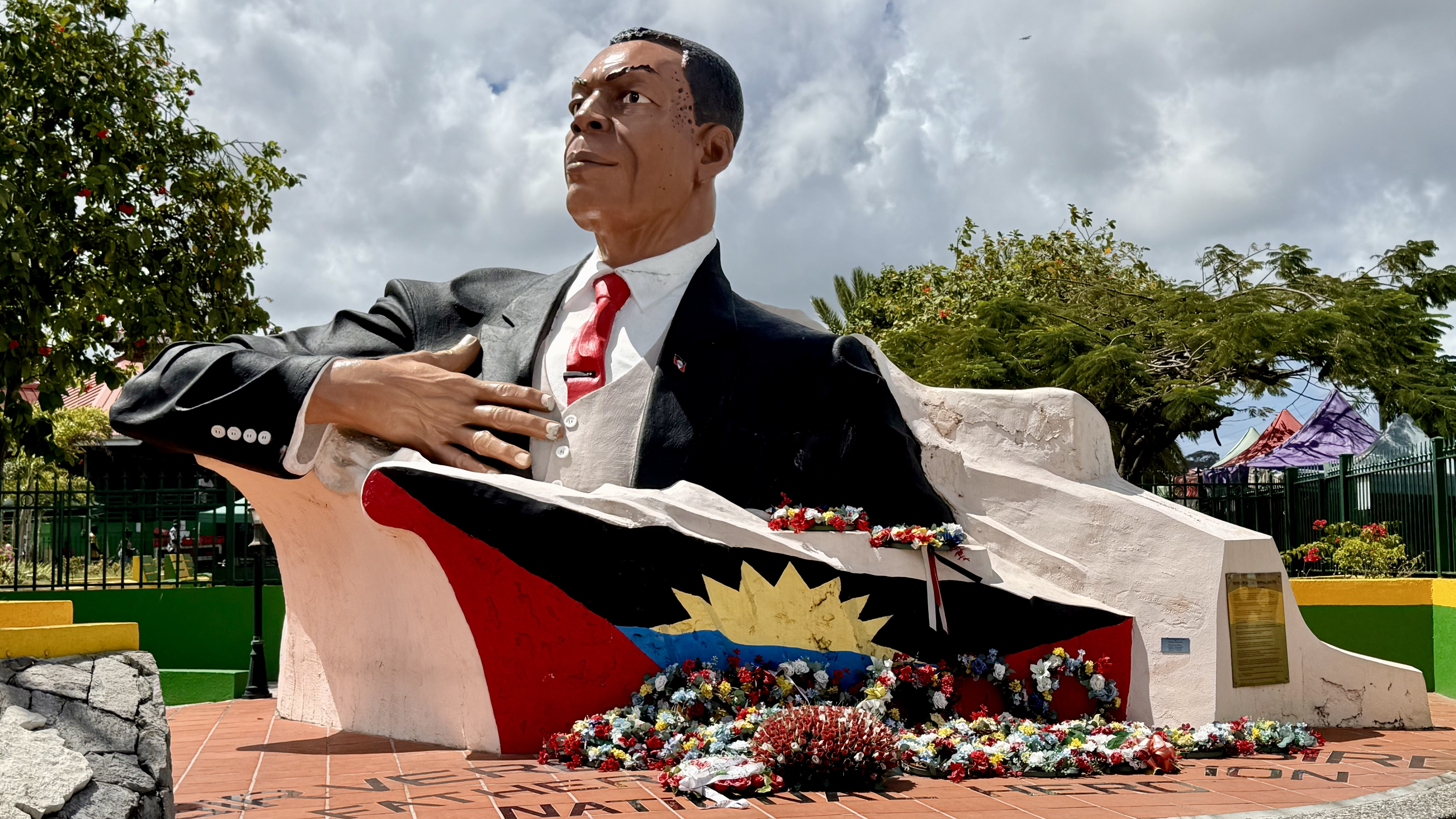
V. C. Bird Monument in Saint John's

Bird died in St. John's at 6:58pm on 28 June 1999, aged 88. He was interred at Tomlinson House, his official residence.

In 1985, Coolidge International Airport, Antigua's international airport named after Captain Hamilton Coolidge who died in WW1, was renamed V.C. Bird International Airport in Bird's honour. Bird was leader of the work force who built the American airstrip, opened in 1941.

== See also ==
- List of foreign ministers in 1991
