= Geography of Barbuda =

Barbuda in the Caribbean

Barbuda is one of the Leeward Islands of the Caribbean, located north of Antigua, southeast of Saint Barthélemy, and northeast of Sint Eustatius and Saint Kitts and Nevis. The island is one of the most sparsely populated in the Caribbean and is mostly covered by the untouched Leeward Islands xeric scrub. It is one of the larger islands of the Leewards and is the second largest island in Antigua and Barbuda. In the island's west, there is Codrington Lagoon, the largest lagoon in the Antilles. Barbuda is a very flat island, with the lowest point being at sea level and the highest point being in the Barbuda Highlands, a large plateau along the island's east coast. To the island's west is the calm Caribbean Sea and to the east is the rough North Atlantic.

Barbuda is considered to be the northeasternmost island in the Caribbean. Barbuda is technically a chain of several islands, with the northwestern portion of the island being a complex network of large flat islands including Goat Island, Kid Island and Rabbit Island. Barbuda is a limestone island dotted with caves, being formed around a now-extinct volcano atop the Barbuda Bank. Barbuda is 161 square kilometres in area (about 62 square miles), being fourteen miles long and nine miles wide. Barbuda is about 25 miles from the nearest island, Antigua. Barbuda has a tropical savanna climate. The northernmost point in Barbuda is Goat Point on Goat Island, the southernmost point is Coco Point, the westernmost point is Cedar Tree Point, and the easternmost point along the eastern coast.

There are four geological formations on the island, the Palmetto Point formation, the Codrington formation, the Beazer formation, and the Highlands formation. The Palmetto Point formation has several post-Pleistocene sand accumulations. The Beazer formation covers the centre of the island about 7 metres above sea level. The Codrington formation is noted for its well-preserved mollusk and coral fossils. The Highlands formation has several caves including Darby Cave and Dark Cave. The island has several bays including Coral Group Bay, Two Foot Bay, Gravenor Bay, and Low Bay. Major bodies of water include Bull Hole in the central-south and the Salt Pond, a salt flat found in the southeast.

The island is noted for its biological diversity and is home to several endemic species including the Barbuda warbler and Barbuda Bank tree anole. The Codrington Lagoon Magnificent Frigate Bird Sanctuary is the second largest nesting site for frigatebirds in the world. Deer are also found on the island due to introduction by the Codrington family.
