= Taylor House (Barbuda) =

Official historic site of Antigua and Barbuda

- Location within Antigua and Barbuda
- 17°35′15.54″N 61°48′49.34″W
- Location: South Coast, Barbuda

Historical Site of Antigua and Barbuda

Taylor House is an official historic site located in southern Barbuda, near Coco Point Road. This site was once the site of a stone house that is now in ruins. It overlooks the rocky southern coast of Coral Group Bay, part of the waterway separating Antigua from Barbuda. It is one of several sites built under Codrington rule in the mixed rangelands of the River area.
