= Palmetto Point (Barbuda) =

Headland in Barbuda

Coordinates: 17.582°N 61.858°W

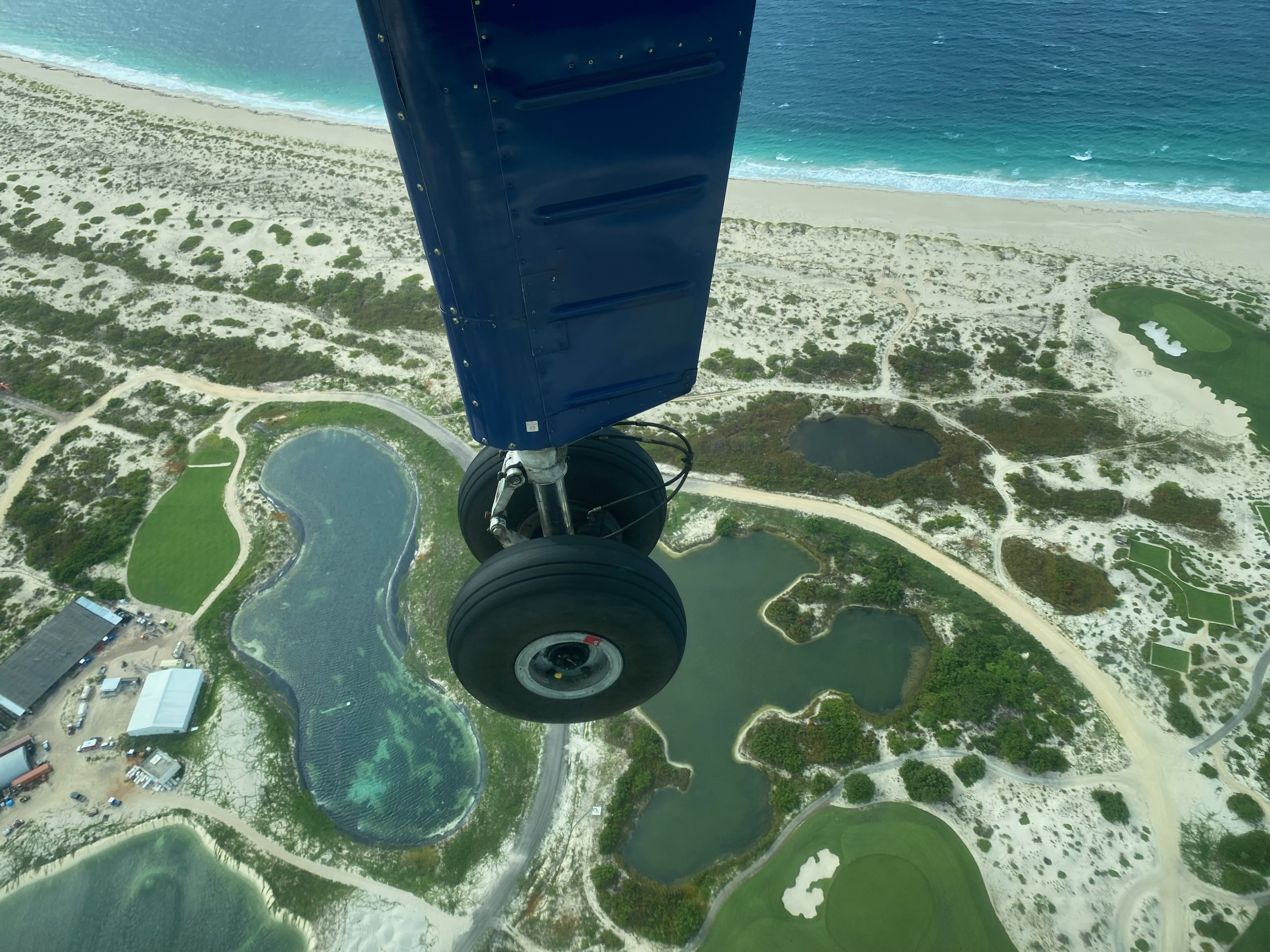
Aerial view of the Palmetto Point peninsula in 2023

Palmetto Point is a prominent headland that marks the southwestern-most point of the Caribbean island of Barbuda. It lies due south of Codrington Lagoon and separates the west and south coasts of the island. A martello tower stands 2 km to the northeast. It is within the administrative district of Palmetto.

== Ecology and environment ==
The area is a part of a Ramsar- designated wetland, due to supporting biodiversity including frigate bird nesting areas, and leatherback sea turtles. Additionally, it is known for surfing, and after Hurricane Irma damaged Barbuda in 2017, it was at risk for development, potentially displacing the natural environment.
