= Coco Point Road =

Arterial road in Barbuda

Coordinates: 17°34′44.06″N 61°47′57.58″W

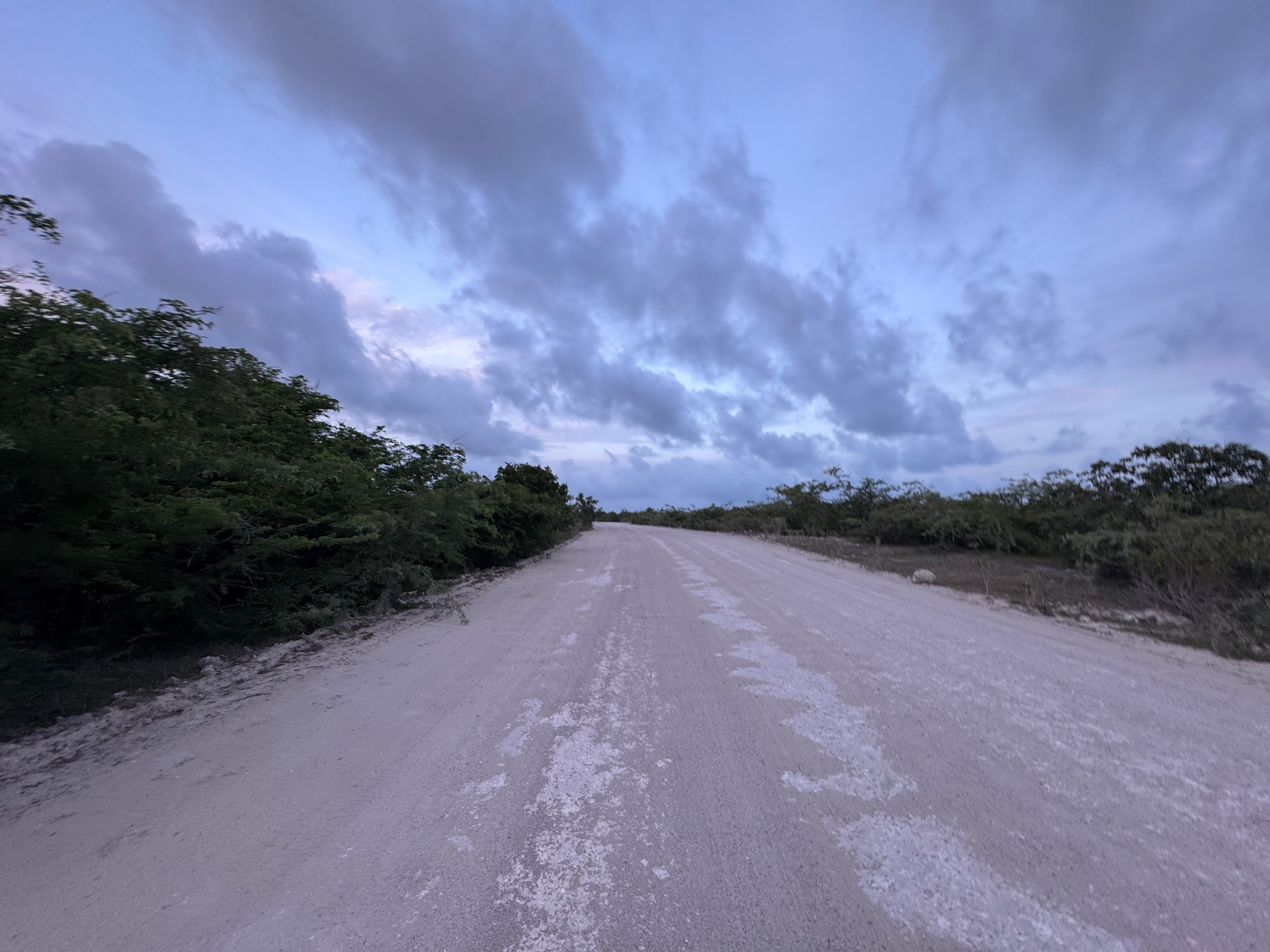
- The road in 2025

Route information
- Maintained by Barbuda Council
- Length: 10.2 km (6.3 mi)

Major junctions
- From: River Road in South Coast
- To: Coco Point in the Salt Lake district

Location
- Country: Antigua and Barbuda

Highway system
- Roads in Antigua and Barbuda

Coco Point Road is one of three arterial roads in Barbuda. The road links River Road at the Martello Tower to the end of the Coco Point peninsula. All goods traveling from the island's main seaport at The River must pass through this road. Coco Point Road stretches across much of the southern coast along Coral Group Bay. The road passes through many important wildlife areas including woodlands and habitats of endemic wildlife such as the Barbuda warbler, Setophaga petechia (mangrove yellow warbler), Lesser Antillean bullfinch, and the Bananaquit. Pools of still water on the sides of the road are also home to mosquitos that swarm the surrounding plants in the daytime. In 2007 portions of the film The Spring Ritual were filmed on the road and its environs. The central government has proposed that proper intersection controls be made for the road due to its status as one of the island's main roads. The road is maintained by the Barbuda Council.

The road commences in the west at the Martello Tower. It continues eastbound towards the junction with Found Out Road and Sand Road at River Wharf (1.1 km). The road continues to the junctions with Fenton Road at 1.7 km, an unnamed road at 2.8 km, a second unnamed road at 5.6 km, a third unnamed road at 7.5 km, a fourth unnamed road at 8.4 km, continuing to the end of the Coco Point peninsula at 10.2 km.

== Junctions ==
The entire route is in Barbuda Parish.

| Location | km | mi | Destinations | Notes |
|---|---|---|---|---|
| South Coast | 0.0 | 0.0 | River Road at the Martello Tower | |
| South Coast | 1.1 | 0.68 | Found Out Road and Sand Road | |
| South Coast | 1.7 | 1.1 | Fenton Road | |
| South Coast | 2.8 | 1.7 | Unnamed road #1 | |
| South Coast | 5.6 | 3.5 | Unnamed road #2 | |
| Salt Lake | 7.5 | 4.7 | Unnamed road #3 | |
| Salt Lake | 8.4 | 5.2 | Unnamed road #4 | |
| Salt Lake | 10.2 | 6.3 | Coco Point peninsula | |
1.000 mi = 1.609 km; 1.000 km = 0.621 mi
