= Gravenor Bay =

Large bay at the southern end of the island of Barbuda

- Location of Gravenor Bay within Antigua and Barbuda
- Location: Barbuda, Caribbean
- Coordinates: 17°33′N 61°45′W
- Type: Bay
- Basin countries: Antigua and Barbuda

Gravenor Bay is a large bay at the southern end of the island of Barbuda in the Caribbean. Its coastline runs roughly east–west and lies between the island's two southernmost points, Coco Point in the west and Spanish Point in the east. Coco Point Airport was close to the western end of the bay, and a large lagoon lies immediately to the bay's north.

The bay is a favoured yacht anchorage and is popular with snorkellers.
