= River Road =

River Road may refer to:

== Places ==
=== Communities ===
- Barbuda-South River Road, Antigua and Barbuda
- River Road, Hamilton, New Zealand
- River Road, North Carolina, US
- River Road, Oregon, US
- River Road, Washington, US

=== Highways ===
==== Australia ====
- River Road (Queensland), a road in Dinmore, Queensland

==== United States ====
- County Route 505 (New Jersey), along the Hudson River
- County Route 533 (New Jersey), along the Millstone River
- Farm to Market Road 170, in Texas
- Georgia State Route 182
- Great River Road, along the Mississippi River
  - River Road, Louisiana
- Jefferson Avenue (Detroit), formerly named River Road
- Louisiana Highway 1064
- Maryland Route 190
- New Jersey Route 29
- Ohio State Route 174
- Pennsylvania Route 32
- River Road National Scenic Byway, in Michigan

==== Canada ====
- Manitoba Provincial Road 238
- River Road (Kitchener), Ontario
- River Road (Ottawa), Ontario

==== Other ====
- River Road (Barbuda), a road in Antigua and Barbuda

=== Historic districts ===
- River Road Historic District, in Florida, US
- River Road-Cross Street Historic District, in Massachusetts, US
- East River Road Historic District, in Michigan, US
- River Road Historic Rural District, in New Jersey, US
- River Road Provincial Park in Manitoba, Canada

== Music ==
- River Road (band), a 1990s country music group, or its self-titled debut album
- "River Road", a song by Crystal Gayle from We Must Believe in Magic
- "River Road", a song by Zayn from Nobody Is Listening
- "River Road", a song by My Morning Jacket from Is

== Other uses ==
- River Road (film), a 2014 Chinese film written and directed by Li Ruijun
- River Road Independent School District, Potter County, Texas
