= Gun Shop Cliff =

Official historic site of Antigua and Barbuda

- Location within Antigua and Barbuda
- 17°39′59.94″N 61°46′0.08″W
- Location: Two Foot Bay

Historical Site of Antigua and Barbuda

Gun Shop Cliff is an official historic site located in the Hog Cliffs of northern Barbuda. The Barbuda Island Company once mined guano here in the 1890s. There is also a small stone structure below the cliff that was related to this activity– the structure was built with locally-sourced stone and imported wood, possibly from mainland North America. There is also a cave here.
