= Bull Hole =

Body of water in Barbuda

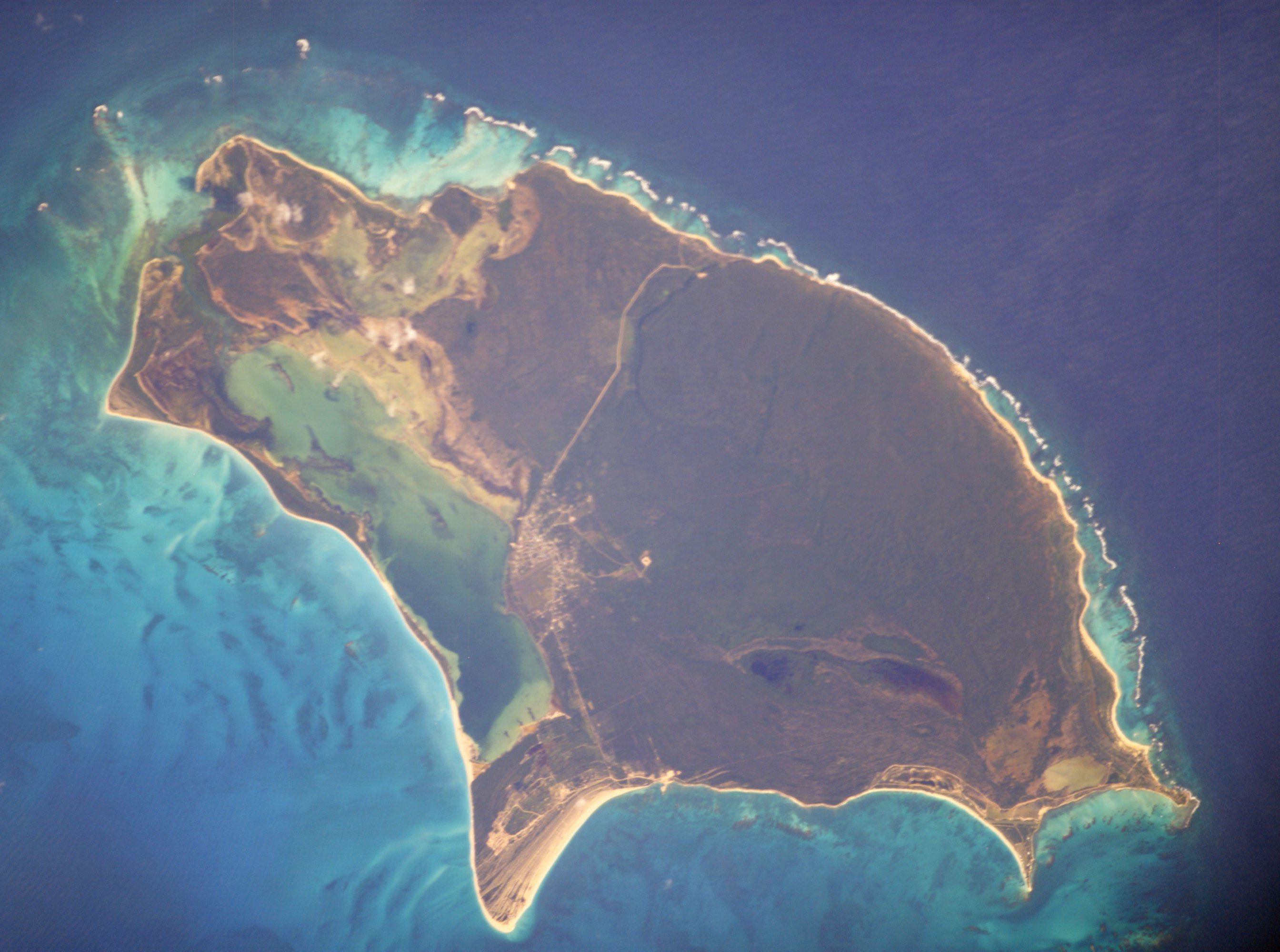
- Satellite image of Barbuda with Bull Hole in the central-south

- Location within Antigua and Barbuda
- Location: South Coast, Barbuda, Antigua and Barbuda
- Coordinates: 17°36′7.24″N 61°47′47.90″W
- Type: wetland

Bull Hole is a protected wetland in the South Coast and Midlands districts of Barbuda. It is officially protected by various laws including the Environmental Protection and Management Acts of 2015 and 2019. It is one of the only freshwater bodies on the island during the dry season. Plant species found in the area include Coccoloba krugii (wild grape), Canella winterana (wild cinnamon), and Comocladia dodonaea (hogwood).
