= Coral Bay =

Coral Bay may mean:

- Coral Bay, Barbuda, also known as Coral Group Bay
- Coral Bay, Western Australia
- Coral Bay, United States Virgin Islands, a town on the island of St. John
- Coral Bay, Cyprus
