= Salt Lake, Barbuda =

Salt Lake
- District
- Coordinates: 17°33′25″N 61°45′52″W
- Country: Antigua and Barbuda
- Island: Barbuda

Area
  - Total: 12.54 km^{2} (4.84 sq mi)

Salt Lake is an administrative district of Barbuda. It has an area of 12.54 square kilometres and includes both Coco Point and Spanish Point, as well as the Salt Pond.
