= Princess Diana Beach =

Beach in Barbuda

- Beach
- The beach in 2026

- Location within Antigua and Barbuda
- Coordinates: 17°33′9.4″N 61°46′4.1″W
- Location: Coco Point, Barbuda

Princess Diana Beach, also known as Access Beach and Coco Point Beach, is a beach in the south of the island of Barbuda in Antigua and Barbuda. It is a 3 km long white sand beach that is periodically colored pink due to the presence of foraminifera. In 2011, the beach was renamed after Princess Diana, who had visited the beach many times.

== Overview ==
Princess Diana Beach is located on Coco Point, a 1.5 km peninsula that separates two beaches. Eastern Gravenor Beach has wild water due to the wind and ocean current. The western Princess Diana Beach has calm water. It is one of the most popular beaches on the island, but has no facilities.

== Coco Point Lodge and Paradise Found ==
In 1960, William Cody Kelly opened the tourist resort Coco Point Lodge. The resort was small and exclusive. There was room for 68 guests on a site of 66 hectares. Yachts and cars were not allowed. In 2017, Barbuda was hit hard by Hurricane Irma and was temporarily evacuated. On November 15, Coco Point Lodge decided not to rebuild and closed the resort.

In 2015, the Paradise Found project was announced by Robert De Niro and billionaire James Douglas Packer. For Paradise Found, a luxurious hotel, casino, a port for superyachts, and an airport for private jets would be built. The people of Barbuda opposed the plan. During the evacuation, the government of Antigua and Barbuda approved the construction of the resort on a 225-hectare site without the permission of the island council. There are lawsuits to stop the construction.
