= Fishing Creek (Barbuda) =

Official historic site of Antigua and Barbuda

- Location within Antigua and Barbuda
- 17°41′55.40″N 61°48′17.31″W
- Location: Two Foot Bay

Historical Site of Antigua and Barbuda

Fishing Creek is an official historic site located in northern Barbuda. It is a small, mangrove-laden area with a beach. It is described by travel guides as a highly secluded beach area that can be accessed by 4x4 truck or by boat. The beach is also an important nesting area for sea turtles.
