= Hog Cliffs =

Cliffs in Antigua and Barbuda

Coordinates: 17°39′11.48″N 61°45′7.70″W

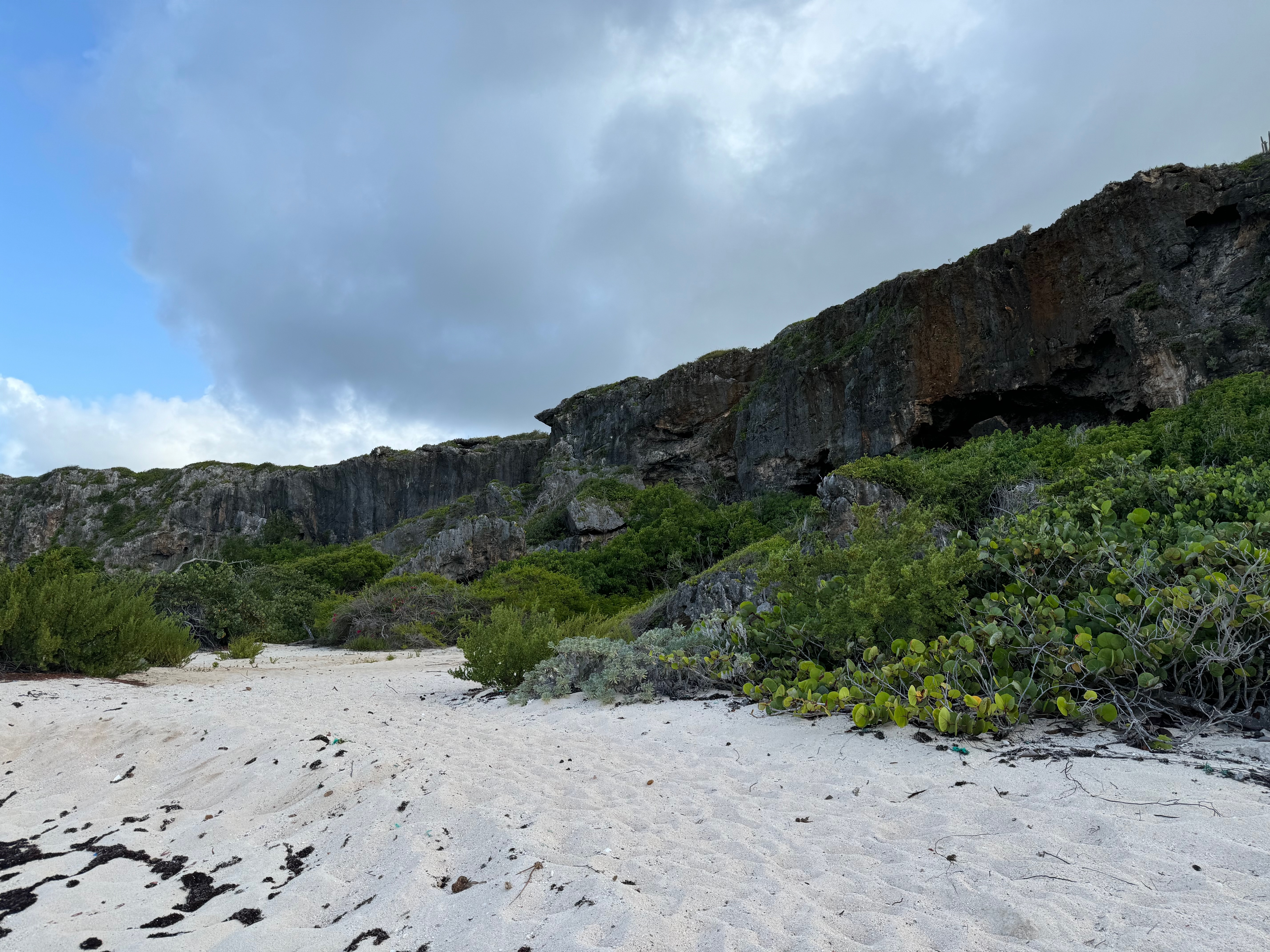
The Hog Cliffs in 2024

The Hog Cliffs are a series of cliffs along the eastern Atlantic coast of Barbuda on the Barbuda Highlands plateau. The cliffs are located about 7 kilometres from Codrington. The Hog Cliffs are one of several locations on the island named after livestock. These limestone cliffs are home to several endemic species including the Red-billed tropicbird and the Antillean crested hummingbird.
