= River Road (Barbuda) =

Arterial road in Barbuda

Coordinates: 17°36′51.72″N 61°49′42.20″W

- Northbound on River Road, 2026

Route information
- Maintained by Barbuda Council
- Length: 5.6 km (3.5 mi)

Major junctions
- From: Two Foot Bay Road in Codrington
- To: Coco Point Road in South Coast

Location
- Country: Antigua and Barbuda

Highway system
- Roads in Antigua and Barbuda

River Road is one of three arterial roads in Barbuda. Linking Codrington to Coco Point Road at the Martello Tower, it is one of the most economically significant roadways in the country and is responsible for virtually all traffic between Codrington and the island's main seaport on Coco Point Road. River Road is very old, being shown on maps dating to 1750 and 1813. The road has undergone significant reconstruction since Hurricane Irma, with the Barbuda Council paving the road in 2024 and 2025. There have been proposals to redirect the road due to various developments on the South Coast. Bypasses such as Spanish Well Road have also been proposed by the central government with aid from the PLH project. The road has two lanes and is the main economic corridor on the island, with restaurants, government offices, and guesthouses. River Road is officially maintained by the Barbuda Council with some aid from the central government. About two-hundred people inhabited the area around the road in 2011.

The road commences at the junction with Two Foot Bay Road and Low Pond Road in the Mulatto Quarter of Codrington. It continues southbound to the junction with Lagoon Street in Indigo (0.5 km), followed by the junctions with Low Mission Street (0.75 km), Top Mission Street (0.85 km), Cemetery Road (0.9 km), Rockshop Road (1.1 km), the unnamed airport road (2.8 km), and ends at Coco Point Road near the Martello Tower in the South Coast district (5.6 km).

== Junctions ==
The entire route is in Barbuda Parish.

Location	km	mi	Destinations	Notes
Codrington	0.0	0.0	Two Foot Bay Road and Low Pond Road	
Codrington	0.5	0.31	Lagoon Street	
Codrington	0.75	0.47	Low Mission Street	
Codrington	0.85	0.53	Top Mission Street	
Codrington	0.9	0.56	Cemetery Road	
Codrington	1.1	0.68	Rockshop Road	
Codrington	2.8	1.7	Unnamed airport access road	
South Coast	5.6	3.5	Coco Point Road	
1.000 mi = 1.609 km; 1.000 km = 0.621 mi
