= Darby Cave =

Official historic site of Antigua and Barbuda

- Location within Antigua and Barbuda
- 17°39′33″N 61°46′30″W
- Location: East Coast, Barbuda

Historical Site of Antigua and Barbuda

Darby Cave is a sinkhole in the Barbuda Highlands. It is about three miles northeast of Codrington, and has a diameter of three hundred feet and a depth of seventy feet. The sinkhole has stalactites up to eight feet long and is described as resembling a rainforest with palms, ferns, and other tropical plants. Deer and land turtles are present in the area.
