= Castle Hill (Barbuda) =

Official historic site of Antigua and Barbuda

- Location within Antigua and Barbuda
- 17°35′59.94″N 61°44′0.45″W
- Location: East Coast, Barbuda

Historical Site of Antigua and Barbuda

Castle Hill is an official historic site located in the Barbuda Highlands. A house was built here under in the 18th century under the leadership of Samuel Redhead for storing goods salvaged from shipwrecks. This hill was also mentioned in a late 18th century map as the location where the sheep of the highlands were collected. There is also a cave here, which in modern times is the most commonly used cave by the Barbudan people for traditional ceremonies and hunting.
