= Spanish Point (Barbuda) =

Headland on the Caribbean island of Barbuda

Coordinates: 17.545°N 61.734°W

Atlantic side of Spanish Point, 2023

Spanish Point is, along with nearby Coco Point, one of the two southernmost points on the Caribbean island of Barbuda. It lies in the island's extreme southeast, at the eastern end of Gravenor Bay.

The area around the point is believed by archaeologists to have been the site of a major pre-Columbian Arawak settlement.

The point apparently took its name from the wreck of a Spanish merchantman, Santiago de Cullerin, lost off the point in 1695.
