= Dark Cave (Barbuda) =

Official historic site of Antigua and Barbuda

- Location within Antigua and Barbuda
- 17°37′24″N 61°45′18″W
- Location: East Coast, Barbuda

National Cultural Heritage of Antigua and Barbuda

Dark Cave is a cave located in the Barbuda Highlands. It is an official historical site in the country and contains various Amerindian petroglyphs, and due to its large pools of water was once likely a source of water. It is home to several rare species, such as the blind shrimp. It also has a population of bats.
