= Salt Pond (Barbuda) =

Body of water in Barbuda

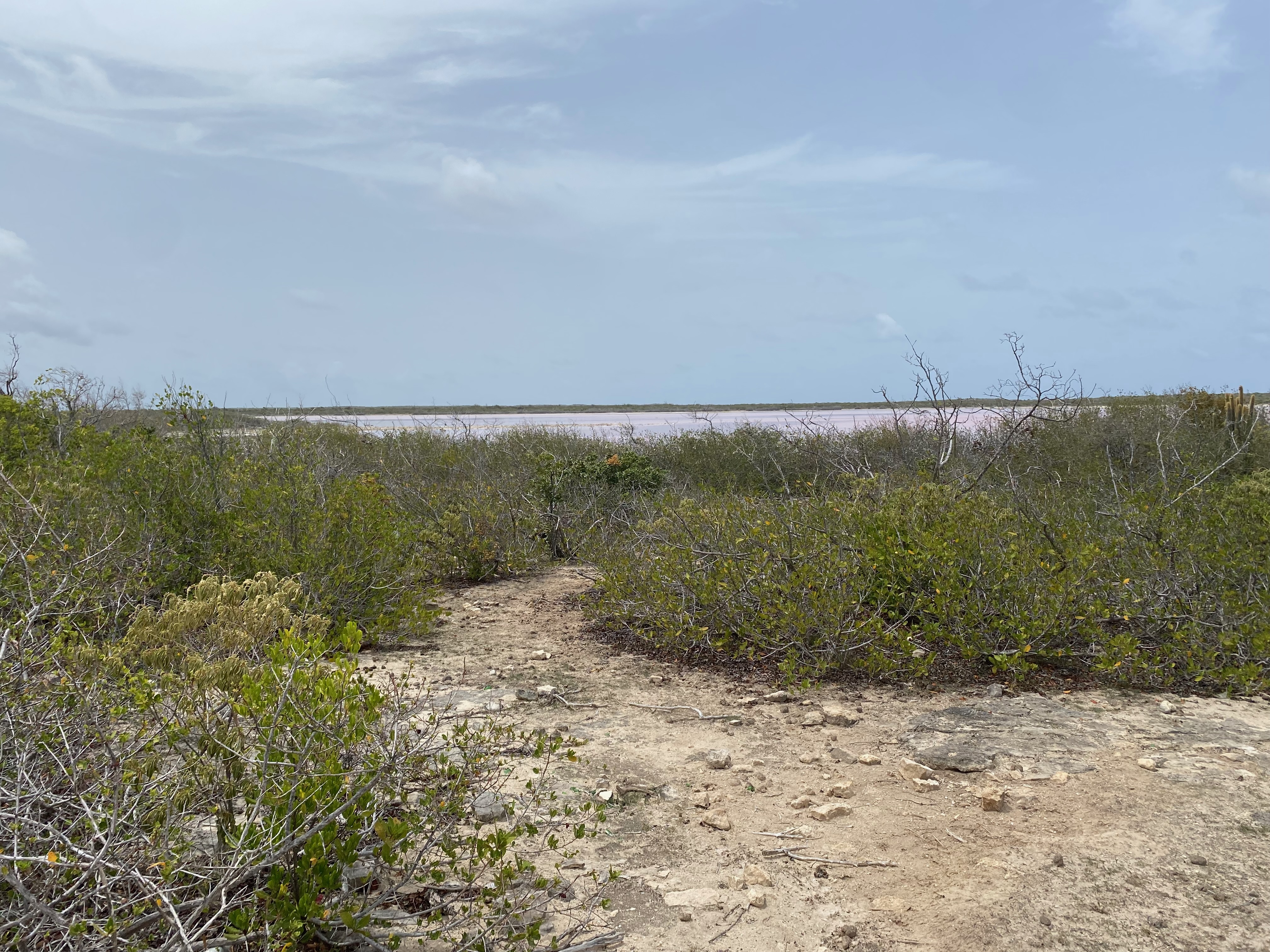
- The Salt Pond in 2022

- Location within Antigua and Barbuda
- Location: Salt Lake, Barbuda, Antigua and Barbuda
- Coordinates: 17°33′30.02″N 61°45′05.34″W
- Type: salt flat

The Salt Pond is a salt flat in the Salt Lake district of Barbuda. The location is considered to be quite important in Barbudan culture and has been the site of traditional salt collection for generations. In 2011 there were proposals to connect it to the nearby Gravenor Bay and convert it into a marina. Salt from the pond is slightly pink in colour.
