= Highland House (Barbuda) =

Official historic site of Antigua and Barbuda

- Location within Antigua and Barbuda
- 17°39′57″N 61°47′25″W
- Location: East Coast, Barbuda

National Cultural Heritage of Antigua and Barbuda

Highland House is a set of stone ruins in the Barbuda Highlands. It is located about three miles north of Codrington and from the site most of the island is visible. It was inhabited by the Codrington family and all that remains are the floors, lower walls, and a cistern.
