= Barbuda Bank =

Submerged carbonate platform in the Atlantic Ocean

Coordinates: 17°21′59.38″N 61°49′1.38″W

- Submerged bank
- Barbuda Bank (the Caribbean)
- Country: Antigua and Barbuda

Area
  - Total: 3,500 km^{2} (1,400 sq mi)

The Barbuda Bank is a large submerged carbonate platform in the Atlantic Ocean, covering about 3,500 square kilometres. Three major islands emerge above the bank: Antigua, Barbuda, and Redonda. The shallow nature of the bank has nurtured coral reefs and seagrass populations that indirectly contributed to the seafood-based diet of the ancient Antiguans and Barbudans, and to the aquaculture of modern-day Antigua and Barbuda.
