= Barbuda-South =

Village and Enumeration District in Barbuda

Coordinates: 17.628726337574175°N 61.82646729239798°W

Barbuda-South Baabyuuda-Sout
- Village and enumeration district
- Location within Antigua and Barbuda
- Country: Antigua and Barbuda
- Island: Barbuda
- Major division: Rest of Barbuda

Population (2011)
  - Total: 227
- Time zone: UTC-4 (AST)

Barbuda-South or Barbuda South River Road, is a village and enumeration district on the island of Barbuda.

== Demographics ==
Barbuda-South has one enumeration district, ED 90400 (Barbuda-South). Before the 2011 census, it was enumeration district 90500.

=== Census data (2011) ===
Ethnic
Q48 Ethnic	Counts	%
African descendent	222	97.76%
Caucasian/White	1	0.45%
East Indian/India	2	0.90%
Mixed (Black/White)	2	0.90%
Total	227	100.00%

Religion
Q49 Religion	Counts	%
Adventist	4	1.81%
Anglican	54	23.98%
Baptist	20	9.05%
Jehovah Witness	3	1.36%
None/no religion	7	3.17%
Pentecostal	76	33.94%
Rastafarian	2	0.90%
Wesleyan Holiness	48	21.27%
Other	4	1.81%
Don't know/Not stated	6	2.71%
Total	225	100.00%
NotApp :	2	

Insurance
Q53 Insurance	Counts	%
Yes	131	57.85%
No	92	40.36%
Don't know/Not stated	4	1.79%
Total	227	100.00%

Internet use
Q55 Internet Use	Counts	%
Yes	103	45.29%
No	120	52.91%
Don't know/Not stated	4	1.79%
Total	227	100.00%

Country of birth
Q58. Country of birth	Counts	%
Antigua and Barbuda	209	91.93%
Canada	3	1.35%
Other European countries	1	0.45%
Dominica	3	1.35%
Guyana	2	0.90%
Jamaica	1	0.45%
St. Vincent and the Grenadines	2	0.90%
United Kingdom	3	1.35%
USA	2	0.90%
Not Stated	1	0.45%
Total	227	100.00%

Social security
Q54.1 Social Security	Counts	%
No	20	15.63%
Yes	110	84.38%
Total	130	100.00%
NotApp :	96	
Missing :	1	

Lived overseas
Q61 Lived Overseas	Counts	%
Yes	31	14.63%
No	178	85.37%
Total	209	100.00%
NotApp :	18	

Country of citizenship
Q71 Country of Citizenship 1	Counts	%
Antigua and Barbuda	218	95.96%
Canada	2	0.90%
Dominica	1	0.45%
Guyana	1	0.45%
Jamaica	1	0.45%
St. Vincent and the Grenadines	1	0.45%
United Kingdom	1	0.45%
Other countries	2	0.90%
Total	227	100.00%

Country of second/dual citizenship
Q71 Country of Second/Dual Citizenship	Counts	%
Canada	4	22.22%
Dominica	2	11.11%
Guyana	1	5.56%
St. Vincent and the Grenadines	1	5.56%
United Kingdom	2	11.11%
USA	8	44.44%
Total	18	100.00%
NotApp :	209	

Business earning
Q91 Business Earning	Counts	%
Under 1,000 $EC per month	3	21.43%
1,000 to 1,999 $EC per month	5	35.71%
3,000 to 4,999 $EC per month	3	21.43%
5,000 $EC and over per month	3	21.43%
Total	14	100.00%
NotApp :	210	
Missing :	3	

== See also ==
- River Road (Barbuda)
