= Coco Point Lodge Airstrip =

- IATA: none; ICAO: ~~TAPT~~

Summary
- Airport type: Private
- Serves: Coco Point
- Location: Antigua and Barbuda
- Elevation AMSL: 56 ft / 17 m
- Coordinates: 17°33′20.6″N 061°45′51.5″W

Map
- Location of Coco Point Lodge Airstrip in Antigua and Barbuda

Runways
| Direction | Length | | Surface |
| Direction | ft | m | Surface |
|---|---|---|---|
| 13/31 | 3,060 | 933 | Grass |
- Source: Landings.com

Coco Point Lodge Airstrip (ICAO: ~~TAPT~~) was a private use airport located near Coco Point, Barbuda, Antigua and Barbuda.

== See also ==
- List of airports in Antigua and Barbuda
