= The River, Barbuda =

The River Dulcina
- Locale
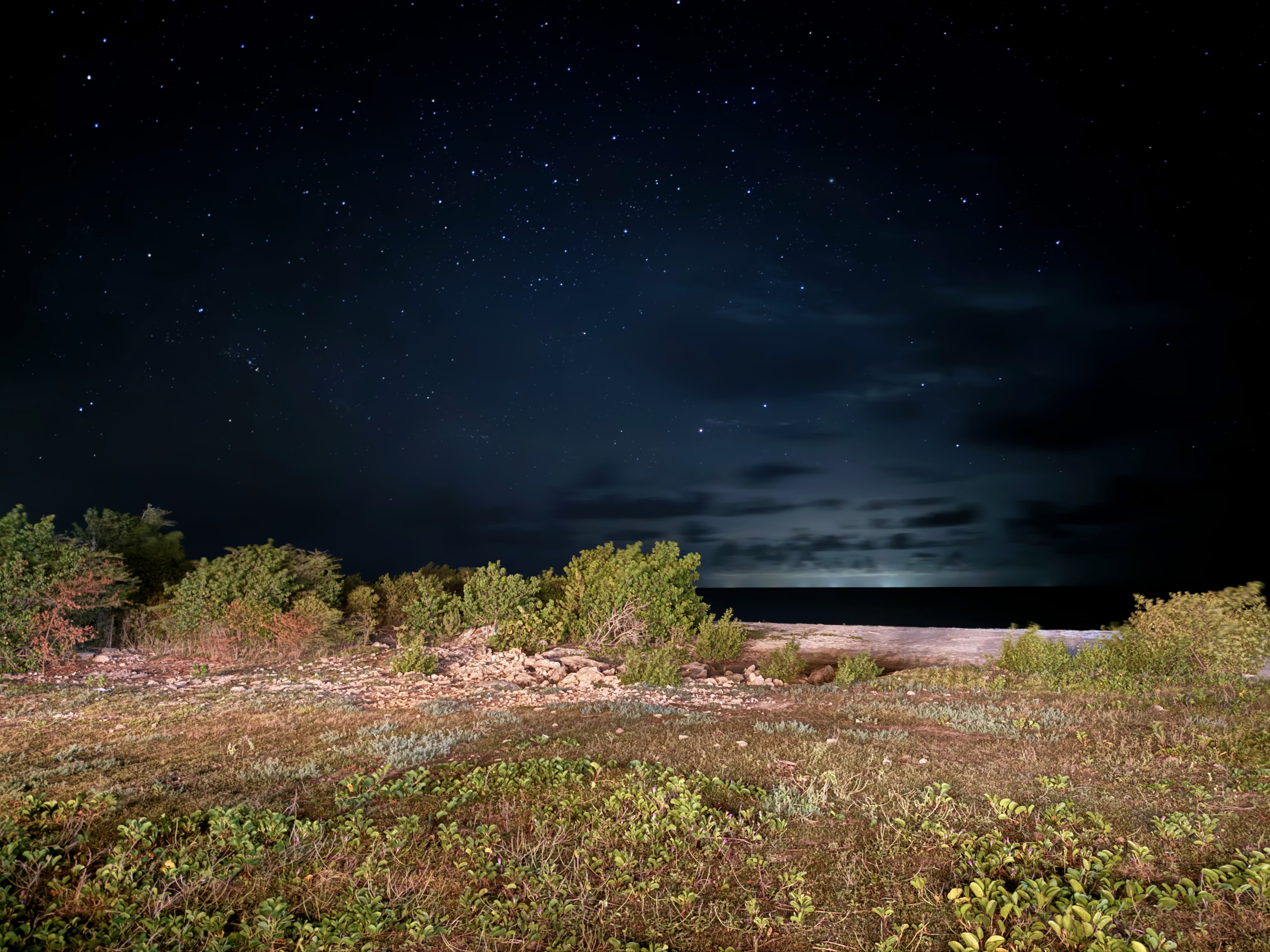
- Antiguan city lights seen from The River

- Location within Antigua and Barbuda
- Coordinates: 17°35′30.6″N 61°49′10.9″W
- Country: Antigua and Barbuda
- Island: Barbuda
- District: South Coast

The River, also known as Dulcina, is a locale in the South Coast district of Barbuda. The River is home to the sole harbour on the island, River Dock (17°35′25.2″N 61°49′16.9″W). Coco Point Road is the main road in the area where it passes through a crossroads. Features include a reverse osmosis plant built with the assistance of the Venezuelan government in 2012, a large scale sand mining operation, and the Martello Tower (also known as River Fort).

The central government has proposed converting The River into Barbuda's secondary economic centre after Codrington. Fishermen that work in the locale have requested a landing area for their operations and business owners at the area wish to see green areas placed between tourist developments and industrial operations. Most of the land is either developed, forested woodland, or mixed rangelands. The River was once inhabited by Amerindians, and there are several artifacts in the locale that have been dated to as far back as c. 3685 BC. The River is located close to the Strombus Line, which has many artifacts showing that this area may have once been a centre of trade in Pre-Columbian times.

The area is highly prone to flooding when the island is not in drought. Contrary to popular belief however, the area is not named after this. Rather, its name originates from an obsolete sense of the word "river", referring to a seashore. The area is mentioned in a 1715 letter written by Sir William Codrington as a non-proper name.
