= Codrington Lagoon Magnificent Frigate Bird Sanctuary =

Protected area in Barbuda

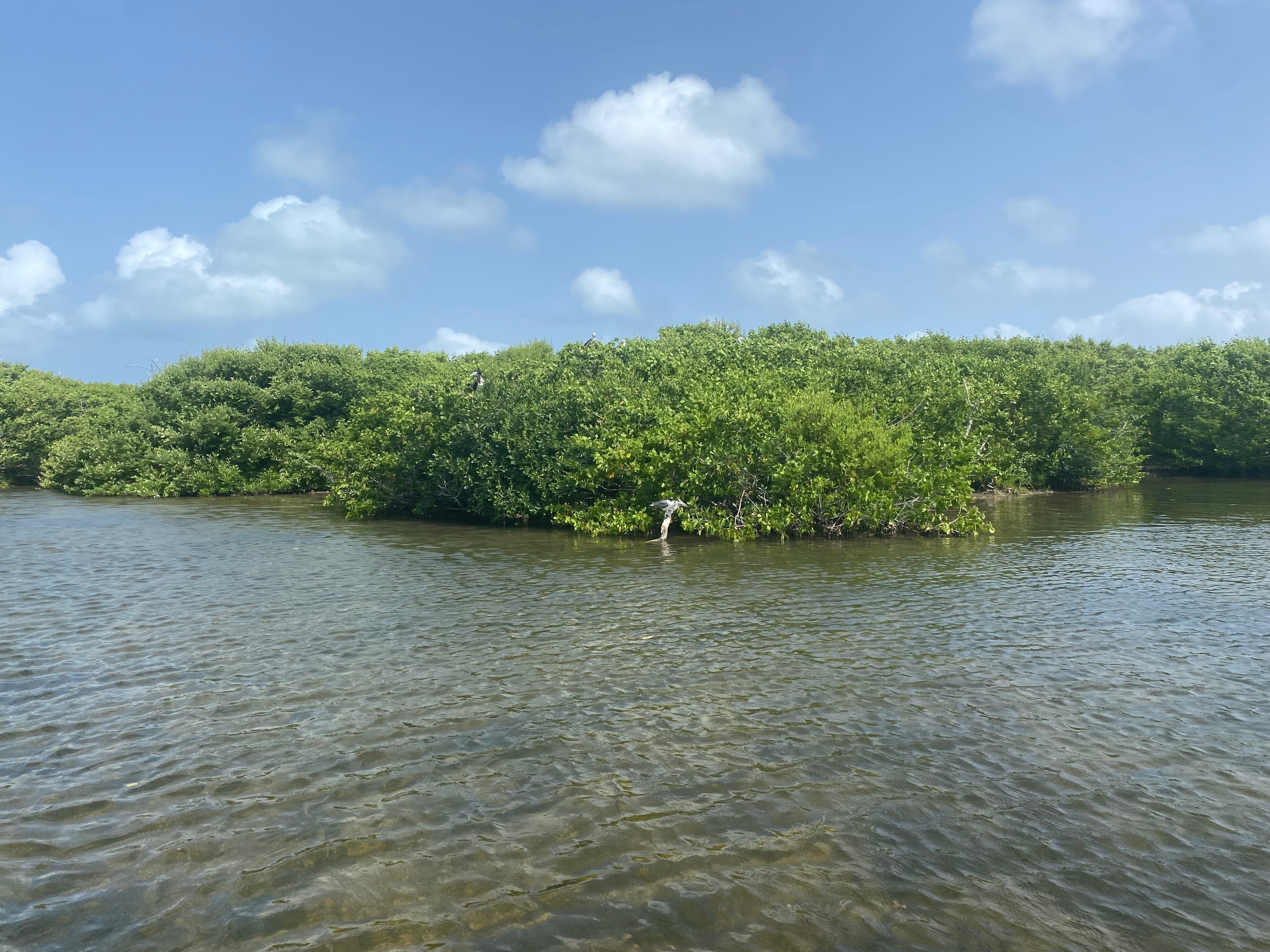
- The sanctuary in 2023
- Interactive map of Codrington Lagoon Magnificent Frigate Bird Sanctuary
- Location: Antigua and Barbuda
- Coordinates: 17°41′49.19″N 61°52′01.25″W
- Governing body: Barbuda National Parks Authority

The Codrington Lagoon Magnificent Frigate Bird Sanctuary is a protected area in the northern portion of Codrington Lagoon in Barbuda. The reserve is one of the most popular tourist destinations on the island and can only be accessed by boat. It is home to over 170 bird species, with the frigate bird population alone numbering 200,000. It is the second largest nesting area for frigate birds in the world behind the Galapagos. Visitors are required to pay a fee of EC$2.00 if they are citizens and US$2.00 if they are non-citizens to the Barbuda Council upon entry.
