= Coral Group Bay =

Large bay off Barbuda

- The bay in 2026 from Coco Point

- Location of Coral Group Bay within Antigua and Barbuda
- Location: Barbuda, Caribbean
- Coordinates: 17°34′41.15″N 61°48′52.43″W
- Type: Bay
- Basin countries: Antigua and Barbuda

Coral Group Bay, also known simply as Coral Bay, is a large bay on the southern coast of Barbuda, between Palmetto Point in the west and Coco Point in the east. Coco Point Road follows much of its coastline. It is named after the abundance of coral and is popular with travellers due to its clear waters and white sand beaches. It is also a secure anchorage for boats, making it popular with yachters.

The main port on the bay is at The River, which is also the island's main harbour. The bay's reefs have many good snorkeling opportunities. Stringrays and sea turtles are often spotted.
