= Palmetto, Barbuda =

Palmetto
- District
- Coordinates: 17°35′52″N 61°50′45″W
- Country: Antigua and Barbuda
- Island: Barbuda

Area
  - Total: 7.18 km^{2} (2.77 sq mi)

Palmetto is an administrative district of Barbuda. It has an area of 7.18 square kilometres and includes Palmetto Point as well as Sand Ground.
