= Low Bay =

Large bay off Barbuda

- Location of Low Bay within Antigua and Barbuda
- Location: Barbuda, Caribbean
- Coordinates: 17°38′22.62″N 61°51′24.40″W
- Type: Bay
- Basin countries: Antigua and Barbuda

Low Bay is a large bay off the western coast of Barbuda. It is separated from Codrington Lagoon by two small sandbank separated after Hurricane Irma in 2017. Low Bay is popular with yachters and has a seventeen-mile series of beaches that occasionally hosts the pink sand beach phenomena. It is considered to be an excellent snorkeling spot. Low Bay was the location of the most recent murder associated with Barbuda in January 1994. The last murder on the island's mainland took place during a slave rebellion in the 1740s.

== Gallery ==
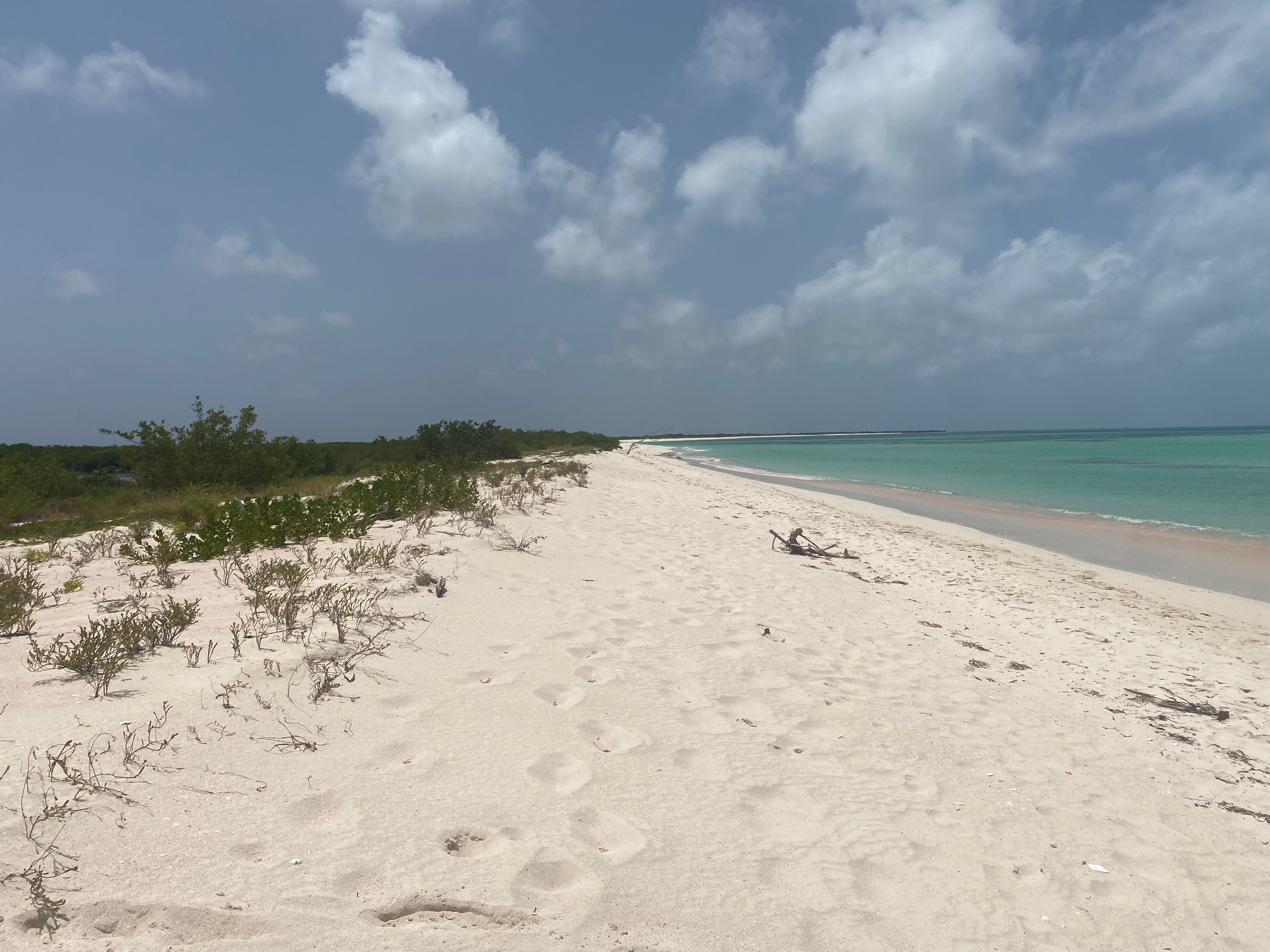
17-mile beach

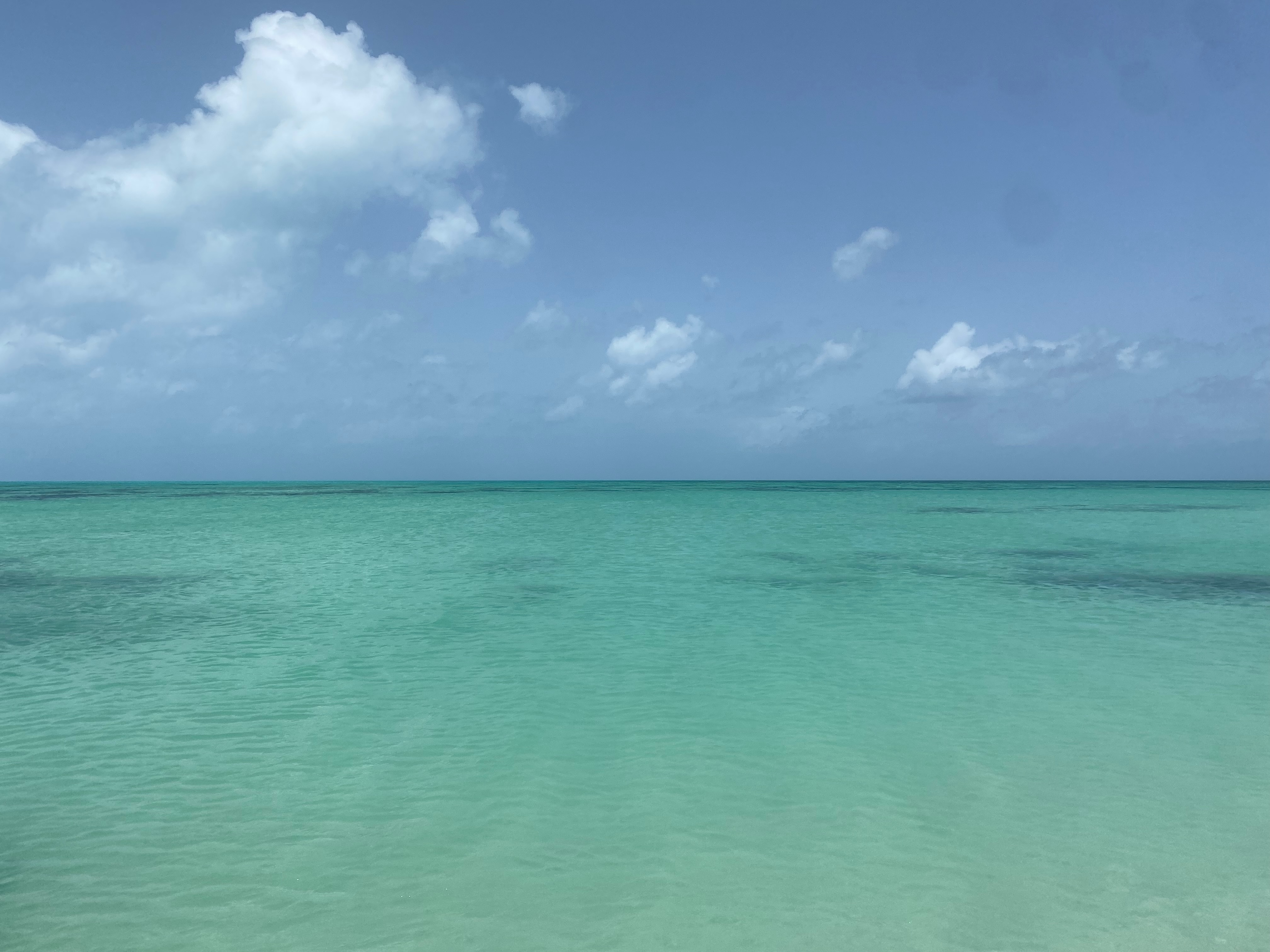
The Caribbean Sea from the west coast

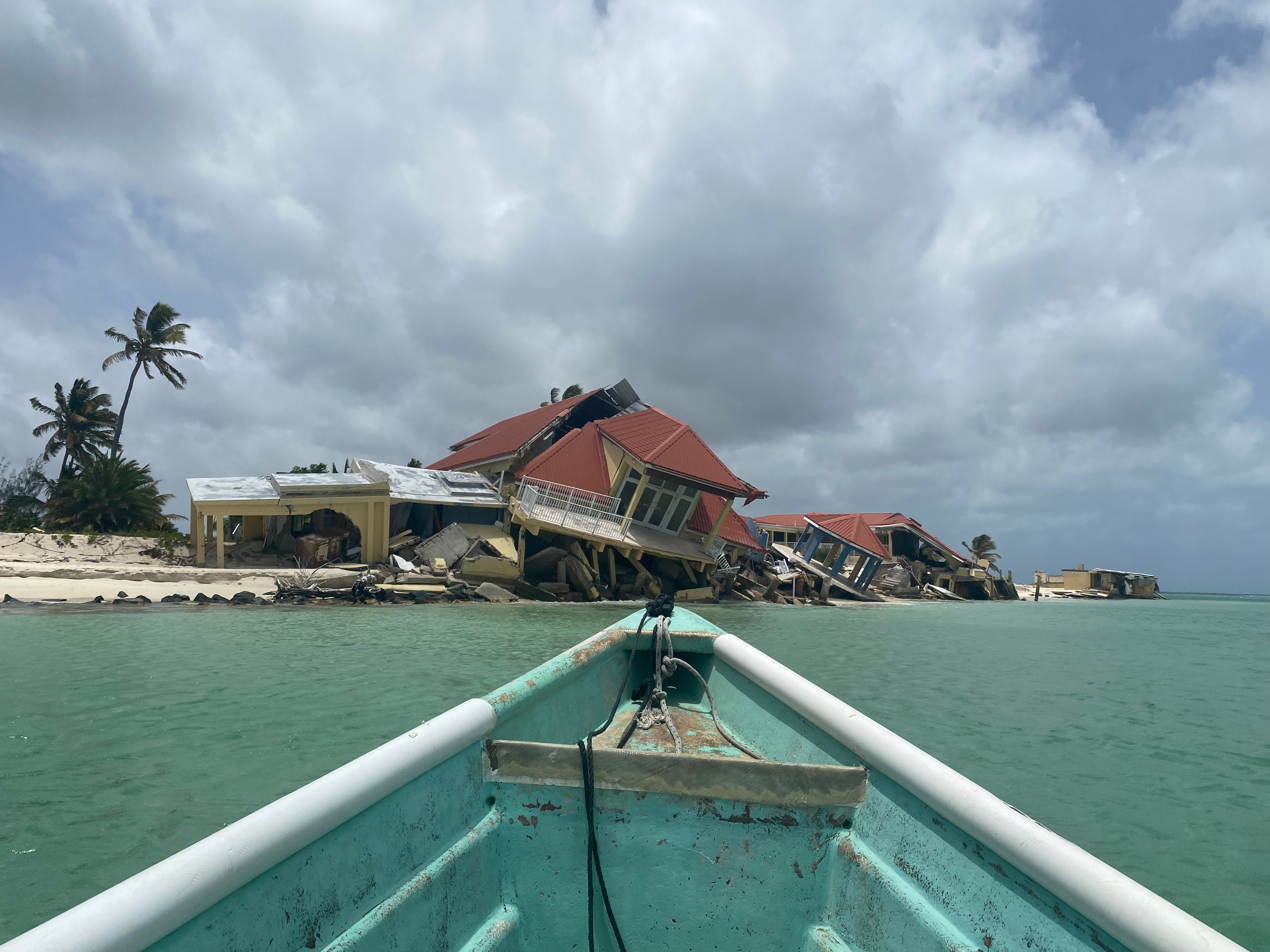
A destroyed hotel on the bay
