= Strombus Line =

Official historic site of Antigua and Barbuda

- Location within Antigua and Barbuda
- 17°35′36″N 61°49′19″W
- Location: South Coast, Barbuda

National Cultural Heritage of Antigua and Barbuda

The Strombus Line is an archeological site in South Coast, Barbuda. It is a linear shellfish midden, with significant quantities of shellfish remains and ancient human tools used during the Archaic Age. Excavations at the site in 2011 and 2012 revealed that Barbuda was likely once a centre of trade in the Archaic Caribbean.
