= West Coast, Barbuda =

West Coast
- District
- Coordinates: 17°41′47″N 61°52′57″W
- Country: Antigua and Barbuda
- Island: Barbuda

Area
  - Total: 5.55 km^{2} (2.14 sq mi)

West Coast is an administrative district of Barbuda. It has an area of 5.55 square kilometres and extends from Billy Point to the canal and borders Low Bay to the west.
