= Tropical marine climate =

Category of tropical climate influenced by the ocean

A tropical marine climate is a tropical climate that is primarily influenced by the ocean. It is usually experienced by islands and coastal areas 10° to 20° north and south of the equator. There are two main seasons in a tropical marine climate: the wet season and the dry season. The annual rainfall is 1000 to over 1500 mm (39 to 59 inches). The temperature ranges from 20 to 35 °C (68 to 95 °F). Under the Köppen climate classification, a "tropical marine climate" would fall under Af or Am, tropical rainforest or tropical monsoon climate. The trade winds blow all year round and are moist, as they pass over warm seas. These climatic conditions are found, for example, across the Caribbean, the eastern coasts of Brazil, Madagascar and Queensland; and many islands in tropical waters.

== Seasons ==
During the dry season there is less rainfall than in the wet season, but there is little variation in temperature between the two seasons. Tropical marine regions are influenced by anticyclones during the dry season and tropical waves during the wet season.

== Ecosystem adaptations ==
The ecosystems of the tropical marine climate have to adapt to the dry season. Plants during the dry season must conserve water/moisture. However, the extent of the adaptation depends greatly on the annual rainfall.

Hygrophytic ecosystems occur when there is a short dry period with a few rain showers. The soil in this ecosystem holds adequate water for plant growth. Most of the tropical marine ecosystems are close to true rain forests.

=== Mesophytic ecosystem ===
The mesophytic ecosystem is also known as a semi-evergreen forest. It is found where there is a long dry season that has little rainfall. There is less vegetation than in a rainforest. There are only two tree stories; trees shed their leaves or have very small leaves. This provides the plants a way to conserve moisture.

There are fewer epiphytes than a rain forest has as the canopy is dry. In the dry season the ground is covered by leaves that will not decay until the soil is moist. The trees often flower during the dry season and start to grow during the wet season. The soil is usually laterite.

=== Xerophytic ecosystem ===
The xerophytic ecosystem is also known as dry woodland. It is found in areas of rain shadow in the tropical marine climate. This ecosystem often develops soils that drain quickly.

The dry woodland is very different from the rainforest. The biomass is a lot less than a rainforest as there is little rain. The tallest of trees are only 15 to 25 meters high in the dry woodland. Dry woodland trees either have small leaves or shed their leaves. The trees have very thick bark and the trunks are crooked.

=== Variations ===
Mangroves grow in coastal wetlands, which are called hydrophytic ecosystems. The vegetation at the coast are usually adapted to sandy soil. The montane forests and elfin woodlands grow on the cool, moist, mountainous regions.

== See also ==
- Tropics
- Tropical savanna climate
- Tropical monsoon climate
- Tropical rainforest climate
- Tropical and subtropical moist broadleaf forests
- Köppen climate classification
