= Two Foot Bay =

- District
- Coordinates: 17°40′26″N 61°48′25″W
- Country: Antigua and Barbuda
- Island: Barbuda

Area
  - Total: 19.98 km^{2} (7.71 sq mi)

Two Foot Bay is an administrative district and nature reserve in northeast Barbuda. It has an area of 19.98 square kilometres and includes the area north of Two Foot Bay road ending at Gun Shop Cliff. The coast consists of limestone cliffs and caves. Indian Cave contains the island's only petroglyphs. Many birds, including the endemic Barbuda warbler, live in the area. The island's only main road runs from the ferry terminal and Martello Tower in the south via Codrington to Two Foot Bay.

== Caves ==
There are several caves at Two Foot Bay, some of which are large enough to stand in. "The Fridge" owes its name to its low temperature. The Indian Cave contains the only petroglyphs of Barbuda left by the indigenous people.

In the 1890s, guano was mined at Gun Shop Cliff by the Barbuda Island Company. The entrance to the cave is located near the ruin of a house that was probably built by the miners. Access to the cave leads to the Drop Cavern, a round room connected to an 11-meter-high room where bats live. On the east side of Drop Cavern is a narrow passage where petroglyphs are located.

== Nature ==
The area around Two Foot Bay consists of dense bushes with limestone cliffs. The cliffs are inhabited by birds such as the Red-billed tropicbird, the Caribbean elaenia and the Antillean crested hummingbird to breed. In the bushes are birds like the white-eyed snittye, and it is the only location where the Barbuda warbler occurs with a few thousand specimens. In August 2014, the area and the surrounding sea were protected as a nature reserve.
