= Martello Tower (Barbuda) =

Official historic site of Antigua and Barbuda

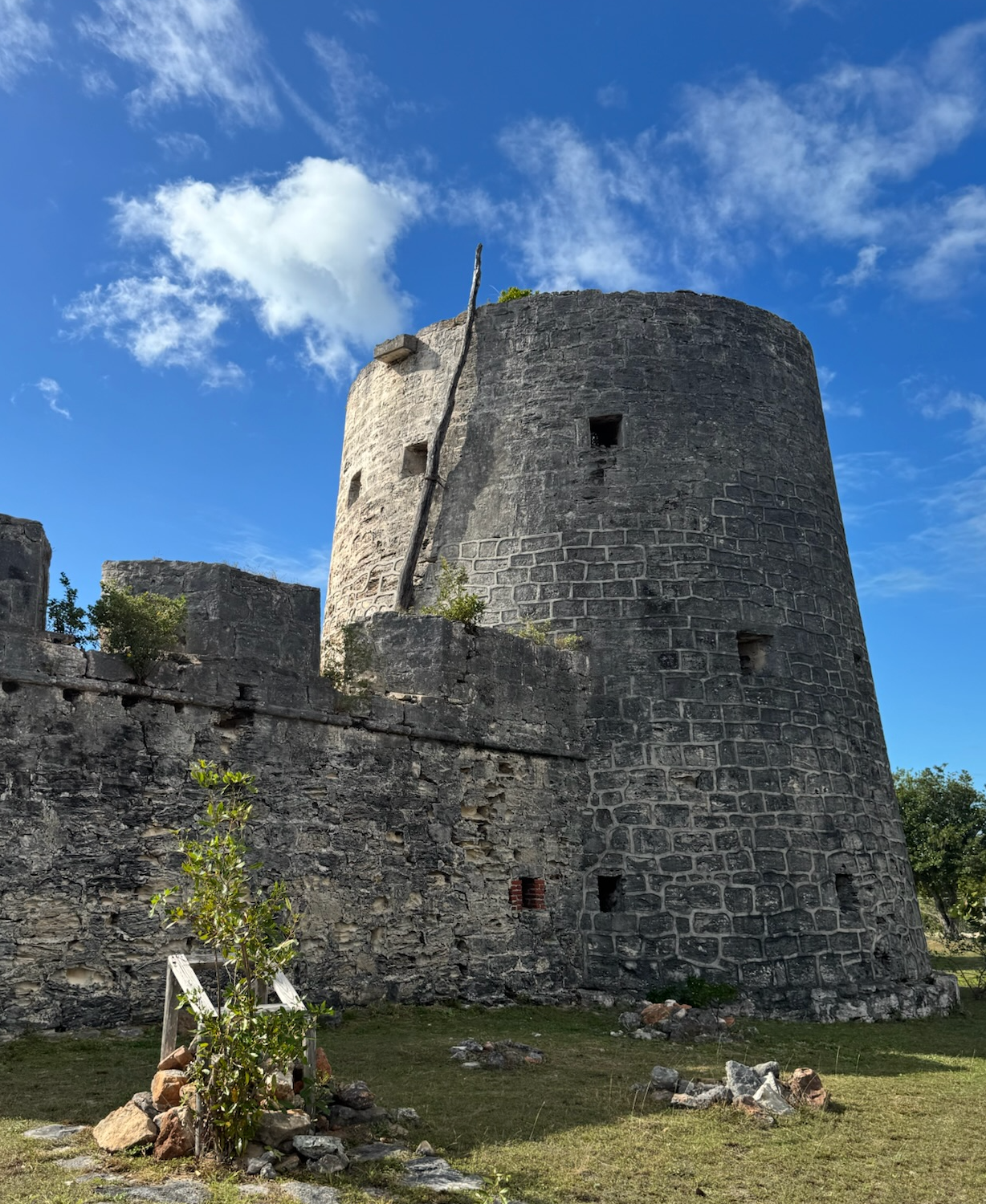

- Location within Antigua and Barbuda
- 17°35′42″N 61°49′45″W
- Location: River Road, South Coast, Barbuda

History
- Built: 1800s

National Cultural Heritage of Antigua and Barbuda

The Martello Tower, also known as River Fort, is a former defensive fort located on a beach about three miles south of Codrington, Barbuda on River Road. The tower is said to be the oldest martello tower in the Caribbean and served as a prototype for future martello towers. At 56 ft (17 m) tall, the tower is the tallest building in Barbuda.

The tower was built during the Napoleonic Wars to protect Barbuda's southern coast and anchorage. Some documents say the fort was built on the site of a former Spanish fort built in 1745. Its design does resemble Spanish towers of the same time period. However, archeological analysis of the structure's timber suggests that the fort may have originally been built by British admiral Charles Knowles in the 1740s.
