= Barbuda Highlands =

Plateau in Barbuda

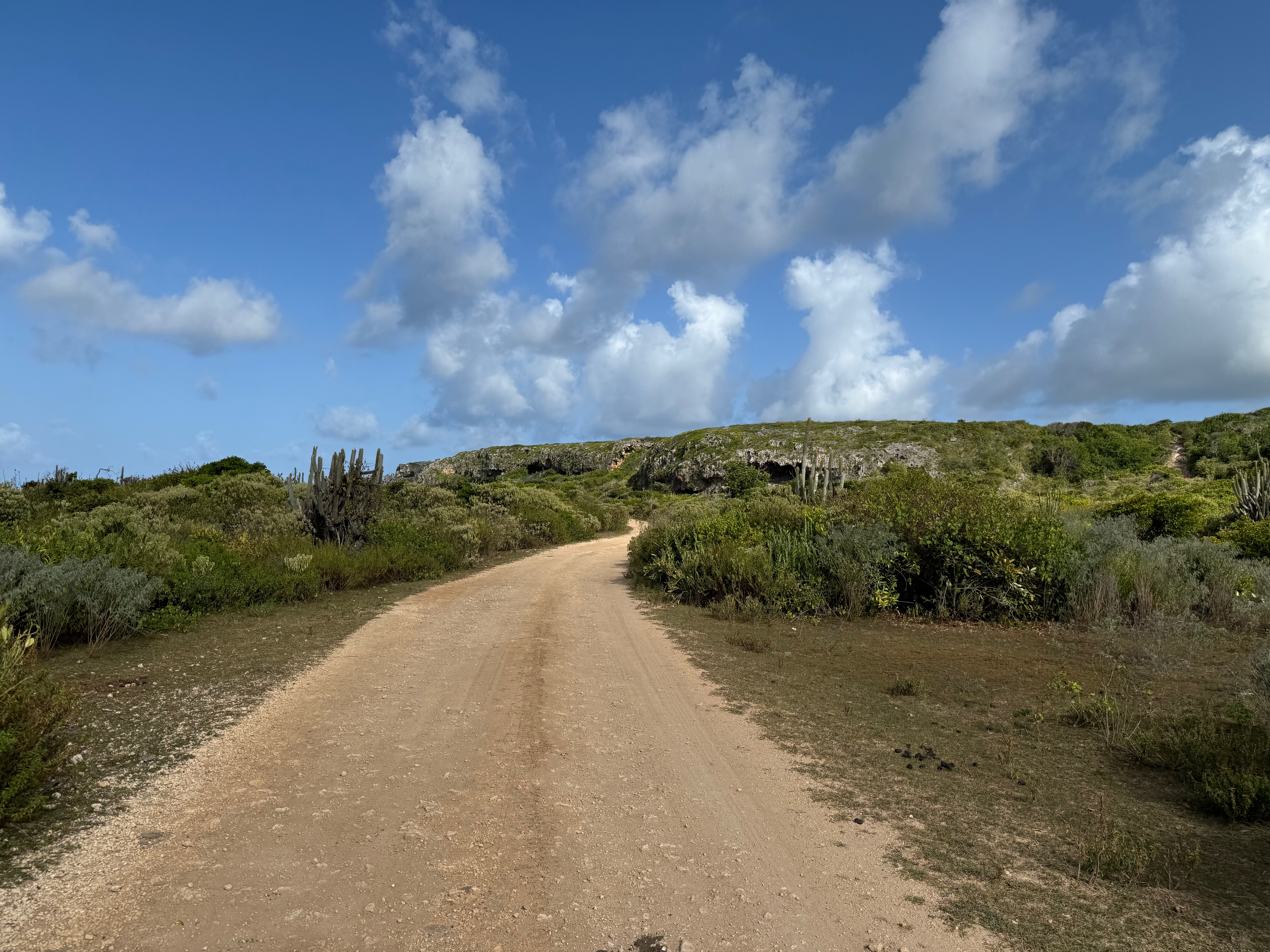
- Northern portion of the highlands

Highest point
- Elevation: 44.5 m (146 ft)
- Coordinates: 17°38′36″N 61°45′15″W

Geography
- Location: Antigua and Barbuda
- Region: Caribbean

The Barbuda Highlands, referred to locally as The Highlands, is a plateau located on the island of Barbuda in the Caribbean. It is named after the now-ruined Highland House. The Highlands includes Barbuda's highest point at 44.5 meters above sea level, and the plateau is characterized by rocky outcroppings, scrub vegetation, cacti and a unique ecosystem that includes several species of endemic plants and wildlife. The Barbuda Highlands are a protected area, and are recognized for their environmental and geological significance. The highlands have many caves and are located on the island's east coast. The Hog Cliffs are located on its eastern flank. Castle Hill was the location of a mansion owned by the Codringtons.
