= Coco Point =

Peninsula on the island of Barbuda

Coordinates: 17°33′02″N 61°45′52″W

Tip of the peninsula in 2026

Coco Point is a peninsula on the island of Barbuda and is home to a luxury resort called the Coco Point Lodge. Coco Point Lodge Airstrip, owned by the lodge, was located on the peninsula. It is the southern-most point on Barbuda, with Coral Group Bay to the west.

The Coco Point Lodge is located on a 164-acre peninsula and can accommodate a maximum number of 68 guests.

Coco Point Road stretches to the southern end of the peninsula, although access is restricted due to the development. Princess Diana Beach is located on the peninsula's western side.

== History ==
In the 1950s, William Cody Kelly had begun to search for what he deemed the best beach in the area. Kelly was trying to find a leeward beach that was ideal for activities like sailing, swimming, and snorkeling. On February 14, 1960, while flying over Coco Point on Barbuda, he found what he wanted and created the Coco Point Lodge.

=== Barbuda Ocean Club ===
Private property sign

The Barbuda Ocean Club is a widely criticized project that hopes to develop the peninsula into "an exclusive collection of private homesites" and a gated community.

Developers of the contentious Peace, Love and Happiness (PLH) project in Barbuda have been accused of "greenwashing" in relation to a study they hired to determine how the large project will affect the human rights of the local population. More than 70 Barbudans were reportedly questioned by the Swiss consulting firm Focus Right to get their opinions on how tourism and residential development are affecting their culture and ecology. Controversy has dogged the plan ever since work on it had started. While some locals have praised the hundreds of employments it has generated, others claim it is harming Barbudans' distinctive way of life by destroying important mangroves and protected wetlands. The probe was started as a result of a critical assessment from UN experts that was published in February 2022, and which voiced grave concerns about probable PLH-related human rights violations and the welfare of Barbuda's delicate ecosystems.
