= East Coast, Barbuda =

East Coast
- District
- Coordinates: 17°37′39″N 61°45′25″W
- Country: Antigua and Barbuda
- Island: Barbuda

Area
  - Total: 37.77 km^{2} (14.58 sq mi)

East Coast is an administrative district of Barbuda. It has an area of 37.77 square kilometres and includes the entirety of the Barbuda Highlands.
