= South Coast, Barbuda =

South Coast
- District
- Coordinates: 17°35′38″N 61°47′53″W
- Country: Antigua and Barbuda
- Island: Barbuda

Area
  - Total: 19.45 km^{2} (7.51 sq mi)

South Coast is an administrative district of Barbuda. It has an area of 19.45 square kilometres and includes most of the Coral Bay coastline and The River.
