= Barbuda =

Island and dependency in Antigua and Barbuda

Barbuda Baabyuuda (Barbudan Creole)
- Flag Seal
- Motto: "Each endeavouring, all achieving"
- Capital and largest city: Codrington; 17.64°N 61.81°W
- Official languages: None
- Ethnic groups (2011): African (95%)
- Demonym: Barbudan
- Government: Barbuda Council
  - Chairperson: John Mussington
  - Vice Chairperson: Nadia George
  - Secretary: Shari Cannegieter

Establishment
  - Colony: 1678
  - Barbuda Act: April 30, 1904
  - Autonomy: December 23, 1976

Area
  - Total: 160.56 km^{2} (61.99 sq mi) (N/A)

Population
  - 2025 estimate: ▲2,233
  - 2011 census: 1,634
  - Density: 10.2/km^{2} (26.4/sq mi) (not ranked)
- HDI (2023): ▲0.824 very high (not ranked)
- Currency: Eastern Caribbean dollar ($) (XCD)
- Time zone: UTC−4 (−4)
- Date format: dd-mm-yyyy (CE)
- Internet TLD: .ag

Barbuda (/bɑːrˈbjuːdə/; Barbudan Creole: Baabyuuda) is an island and dependency located in the eastern Caribbean forming part of the twin-island state of Antigua and Barbuda as an autonomous entity. Barbuda is located approximately 30 miles (48 km) north of Antigua. The only settlements on the island are Codrington and its surrounding localities. Barbuda is a flat island with the western portion being dominated by Codrington Lagoon, and the eastern portion being dominated by the elevated plateau of the Barbuda Highlands, with salty ponds and scrubland spread throughout the island. The climate is classified as tropical marine.

The first inhabitants of Barbuda were canoe-driving hunter-gatherers around 3,000–4,000 years ago. The island was subsequently inhabited by the Arawak and Kalinago. Early settlements by the Spanish were followed by the French and English who formed a colony in 1666. In 1685, Barbuda was leased to brothers John and Christopher Codrington. In 1834, slavery was abolished in Barbuda. Because the entire island had been covered by a single land grant, the Barbudans kept on autonomous cultivation on communal property after slavery's abolition.

With a population of 1,634 (as of 2011), and an area of 62 square miles (160 km^{2}), Barbuda is one of the most sparsely populated islands in the Caribbean. Barbuda has a population density significantly lower than Antigua. In September 2017, the Category 5 Hurricane Irma destroyed more than 90 percent of Barbuda's buildings, and the entire population was evacuated to Antigua. By February 2019, most of the residents had returned to the island. The population of Barbuda is now higher than it was before the hurricane, although the island continues to grapple with the effects of a sociopolitical crisis that has resulted in renewed calls for independence.

The economy of Barbuda is based mostly around tourism and government, with the central government and the local government being the largest employers on the island. Fisheries accounts for the majority of the island's exports, with the island having a significant lobster catching industry.

== History ==
=== Archaic period ===
The first settlements on Barbuda date to 2,900–3,000 BC with the arrival of Archaic Age people. Some scholars have referred to these first settlers as Ciboney or Siboney. Other scholars say these people were not the Ciboney, who inhabited Cuba, Jamaica, and Haiti, and thus refer to them as Archaic Age people, "Archaic People", or first settlers. These first settlers arrived in Barbuda by canoe and were hunter-gatherers. Sources disagree on whether they came from South America or the Greater Antilles, or from the Yucatán region of Mexico.

Artifacts from the Archaic period include cutting blades made from gastropods, along with hoes, picks, and water containers constructed from conch, trumpet, and whelk shells. Archeological sites have been discovered on the southwest coast of Barbuda, from Coco Point up to River, and the southeast corner of the Lagoon. Additional habitat locations have been found in Codrington, River, Sucking Hole, Factory, and Goat Pen along the coast. At Boiling Rocks, close to Spanish Point, more recent human remains that were carbon-dated as being 3,100 years old were discovered.

=== Ceramic period ===
The successors of the Archaic People were the Arawaks, who were present on Barbuda and Antigua from at least 1,000 BC. Their population on Barbuda peaked between 1,500 and 800 years ago. They likely arrived from present-day Venezuela and Guyana, and used Barbuda for brief stays or seasonal supplies. They lived mostly in the Barbuda Highlands and Spanish Point in the easternmost parts of the island, but six or more village additional sites are known including Sufferers, Indian Town Trail, Highland Road, Guava, and Welches. The Arawaks grew sweet potatoes, corn, peanuts, cotton, tobacco, as well as a variety of other fruits, vegetables, and medicinal plants. They also made intricate pottery known as Saladoid. This unique pottery, characterize its white-on-red designs, were decorated with zoned-incised crosshatching. The pottery has been found at Indian Town Trail, close to Two Foot Bay, as well as Sufferers in the Spanish Point region.

The Kalinago people spent time in Barbuda as well. By the time the Europeans arrived, they had probably displaced the Arawaks. The Kalinago preferred the mountainous and well-watered islands of Saint Kitts and Dominica, and visited Barbuda only sometimes to harvest seafood and whatever crops and land animals they could find. In the early 1700s, the British Royal Navy was forced to defend the people of Codrington against Kalinago raids because the Kalinago served as a deterrent to European colonization. The Kalinago called Barbuda "Wa'omoni", which is thought to mean "Island of Herons"; however, it may have also referred to frigate or weather birds, also common on Barbuda.

=== Colonial period ===
Christopher Columbus traveled through the eastern Caribbean south of Antigua in 1493, but it's unclear if he ever sighted Barbuda. Under a Letters Patent granted to the Earl of Carlisle in 1625, Captain Smith and John Littleton attempted to colonize Barbuda from St. Kitts. Barbuda was referred to as "Barbado" in these Letters Patent. Some earlier settlers also called the island "Dulcina". By 1666 the village of Codrington had become the primary residential area. In 1668, a group of about 240 Kalinago attacked the 20 English inhabitants. Eight of settlers died. Around this time, several Europeans were farming on the island on four grants. By 1681, Barbuda was exporting goods to other islands. Ultimately, due to strong Kalinago resistance and drought conditions, this attempt at colonization failed. The island was granted to the Codrington family by the crown in 1685. The colonisers intended Barbuda to be a slave forced reproduction colony but this never went through.

The Codrington family held Barbuda from 1685 to 1870, and were absentee owners of the island. The Codringtons were represented on Barbuda by their resident managers. John Codrington built a castle that eventually became the centrepoint of the village. In March 1710, the castle was attacked by a French force. This force was led by John Bermingham and also resulted in the deaths of several people and some livestock. The slave population in Barbuda grew from 172 in 1746 to 503 in 1831. Due to the increase in the slave population, to increase profits, the Codringtons attempted to transfer some of slaves to Antigua, which was ultimately unsuccessful.

Beach's Rebellion, the first slave rebellion on Barbuda, occurred in 1741 as a result of claims of cruel and inhuman treatment of the island's slaves by the island manager Thomas Beach. This resulted in the killing of several animals, property of the Codringtons damaged, and the escape of several slaves. In 1745, another island manager, named McNish, was killed with seized arms after the mutilation of slaves as a punishment for stealing sheep and cattle. The slaves successfully occupied the Codringtons' castle and its arms and ammunition. To put down the rebellion, soldiers were brought from Antigua, and two slaves (known as "afro heroes") were burned alive in front of the castle at the main gate.

In 1834, slavery was abolished in Barbuda per the Slavery Abolition Act 1833. Because the entire island had been covered by a single land grant, the Barbudans kept on autonomous cultivation on communal property after slavery's abolition.

In 1860, Barbuda was annexed as a dependency of Antigua, after the passing of the Barbuda (Extension of Laws of Antigua) Act (c. 43 (Antigua)) in 1859. This made Barbuda subject to the laws of the Antigua colony.

=== Modern history ===
Barbuda was first granted a status of autonomy in 1976, during the concluding era of the Associated State of Antigua. This autonomous status came after the passing of the Barbuda Local Government Act. This established the Barbuda Council, which allowed Barbuda to regulate its own public works, finance, and agriculture, among other activities. The Barbuda Local Government Act was later enshrined in the constitution under the Antigua and Barbuda Constitution of 1981. The Barbuda Council elects a chairperson and a vice chairperson, with Devon Warner serving as chairperson since 2024.

In 1981 the island gained its independence from the United Kingdom as an integral part of Antigua and Barbuda. It remains part of the Commonwealth of Nations, and remains a constitutional monarchy, with Charles III as King of Antigua and Barbuda.

The right for Barbudans to use the island's lands in common was enshrined in the law in 2007 by the Baldwin Spencer-led United Progressive Party government. On April 5, 2007, the Barbuda Council released the final copies of the Barbuda Land Act, which created a land registry, a Barbuda Planning Commission, and a National Park Authority, all subordinate to the council. In 2017, immediately after Hurricane Irma which devastated Barbuda, this was considered the starting point of the Barbuda land grab which has resulted in various policies and laws made by the Gaston Browne-led administration relating to Barbudan land. On August 1, 2023, it was announced by the Barbuda People's Movement, which controls the Barbuda seat in parliament, and controls the council, that a bill proposed and passed days earlier that would end Barbudan communal land ownership, would vow to do everything to reverse the decision, with the council being in support of the stance of the Barbuda People's Movement.

Christianity is the largest religion on the island, and the main ethnic group being those of African descent. English and Barbudan Creole are the most commonly spoken languages on the island. Based on voter registration records, the population of Barbuda has grown significantly since Irma.

== Politics and government ==
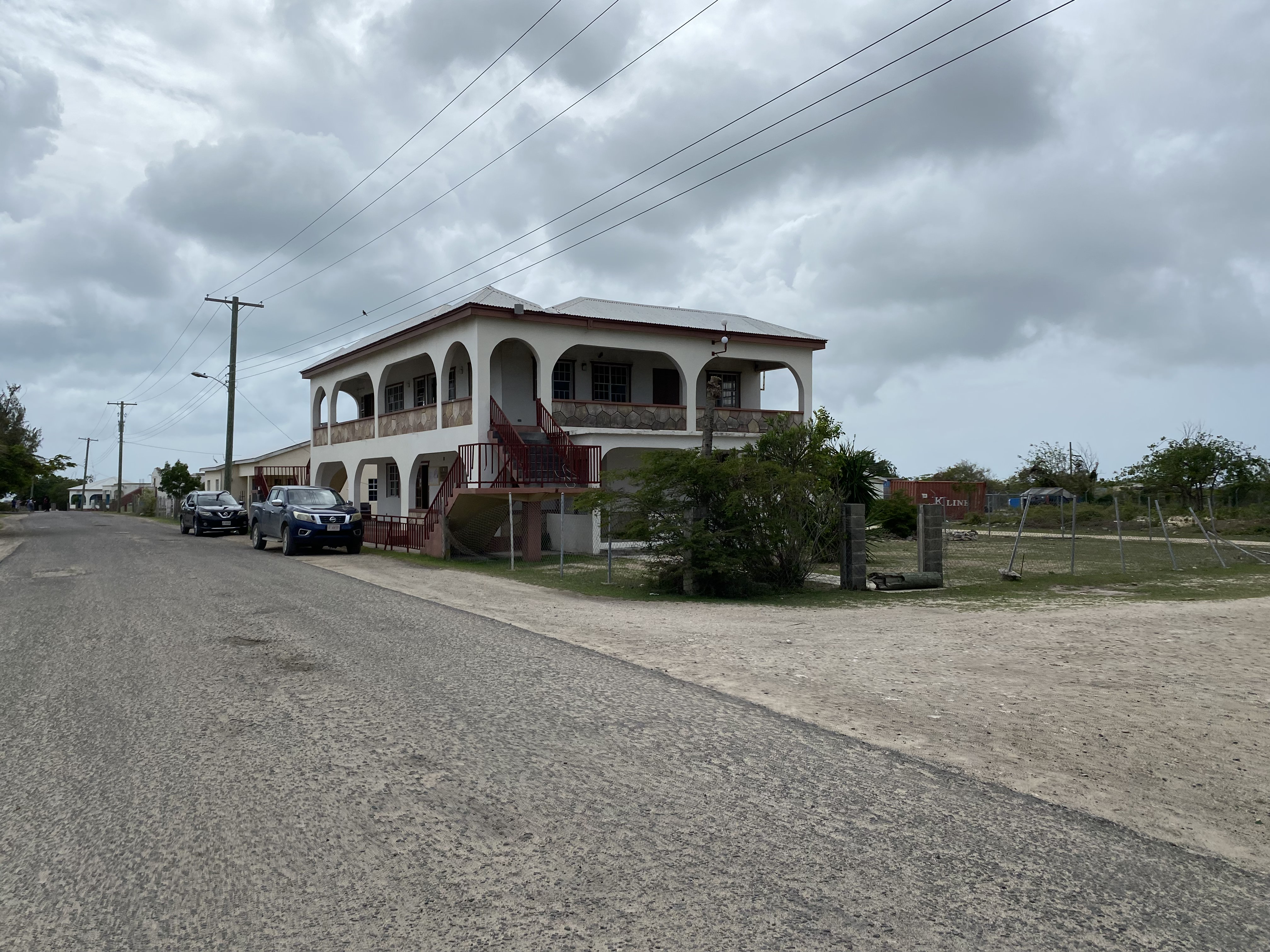
Barbuda Council Millenium Administration Building is the base for the secretary of the council. It is located in Codrington.

Waters under the jurisdiction of the Barbuda Council

The political system of Antigua and Barbuda is a unitary, parliamentary, representative democratic monarchy. Charles III is the present King of Antigua and Barbuda.

While executive power is exercised by the government, legislative power is vested in both the government and the legislature. Antigua and Barbuda elects a legislature on national level. Parliament has two chambers: the House of Representatives, which has 19 members, and the Senate, which has 17 appointed members. There are special legislative provisions to account for Barbuda's low population relative to that of Antigua. Barbuda is guaranteed at least one member of the House of Representatives and two members of the Senate. The current representative for Barbuda in the House of Representatives is Trevor Walker.

=== Barbuda Council ===
The Barbuda Council is an 11-member body consisting of nine directly elected and two ex officio (Barbuda's House and Senate representatives in the national Parliament). Council sessions are held in Codrington. Councillors serve for four years with elections held every two years in March.

In January of every year, the council elects a chairperson and a deputy chairperson. In a year where an election is held, at the first sitting of the council after the election, this is also an instance where the council must elect a chairperson and a deputy chairperson.

The Barbuda Council has many duties, including administering public utilities and other ministries and departments; managing roadwork; and improving building and marine facilities. The Council also has the power to make local by-laws.

=== Districts ===
Districts of Barbuda

Barbuda is divided into eight districts:

- East Coast
- Midlands
- North Coast
- Palmetto
- Salt Lake
- South Coast
- Two Foot Bay
- West Coast

== Geography ==
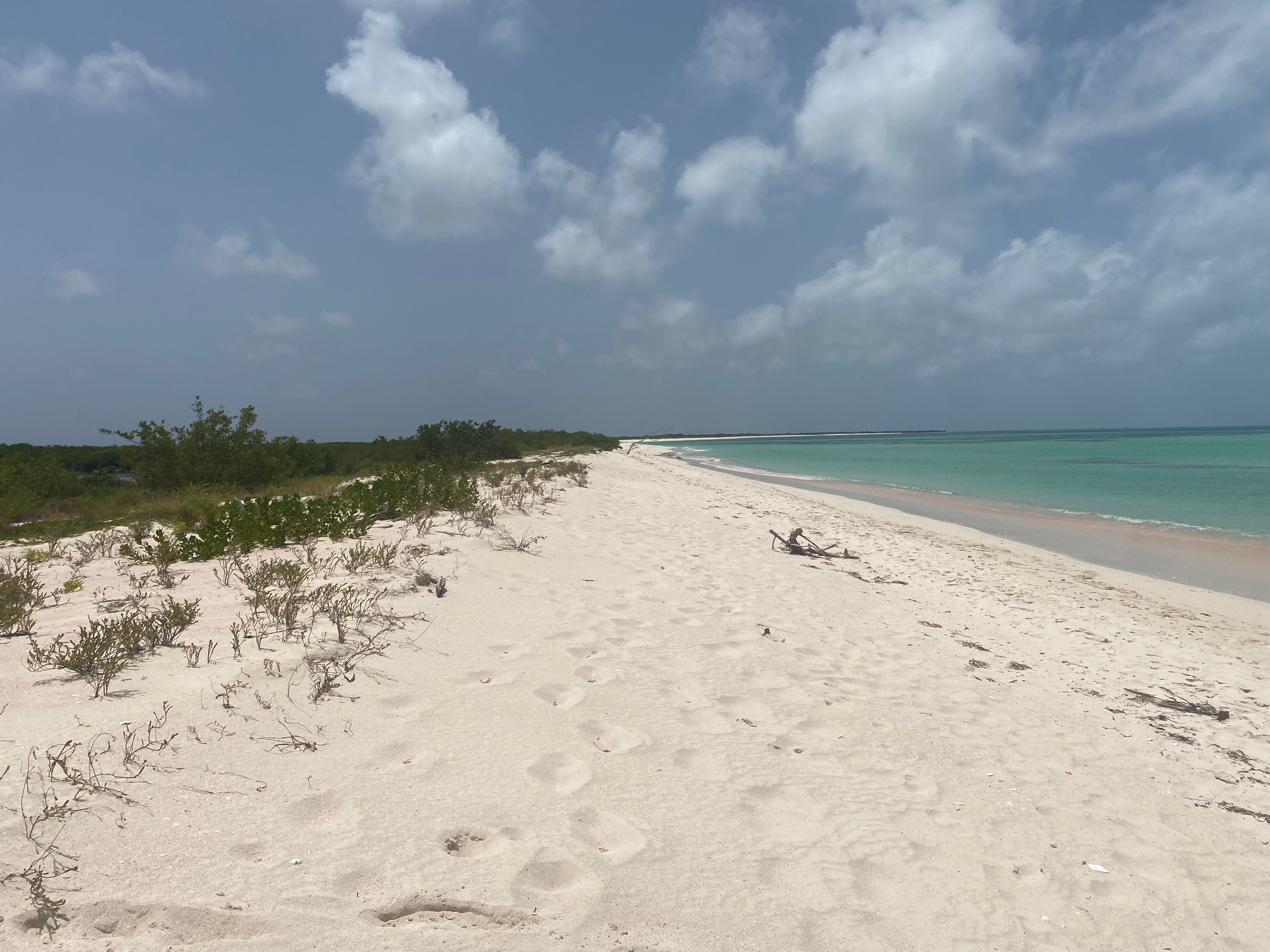
West Coast

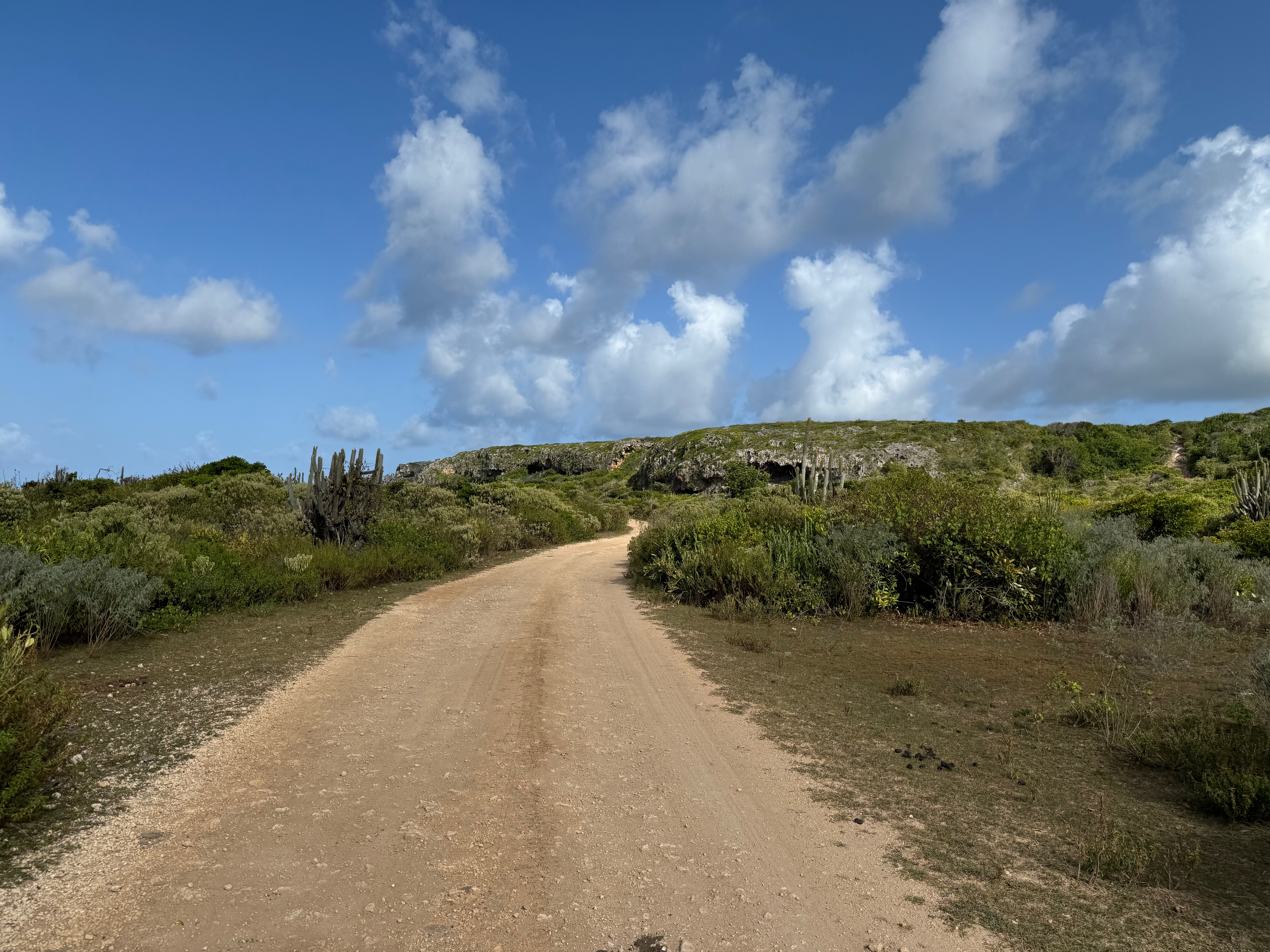
Barbuda Highlands

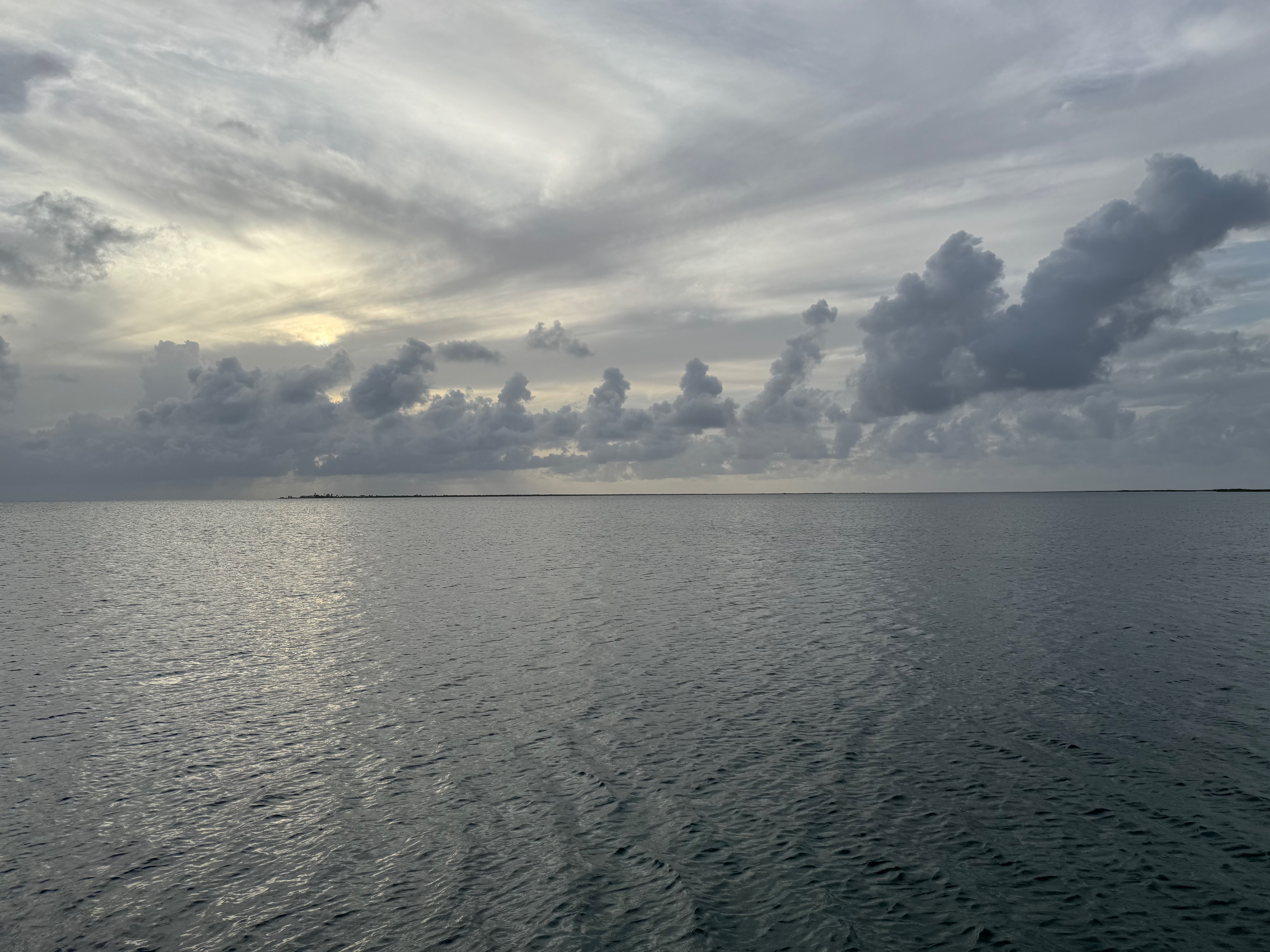
Codrington Lagoon

There are a total of 160.56 square kilometers of land, which is equivalent to 62 square miles. Codrington, which is the largest town, has a population of estimated 1,300 people as of 2011. Coral limestone makes up the majority of the island, which has very little topographical diversity. The Barbuda Highlands on the eastern side of the island is home to hills that can reach heights of up to 38 meters (125 feet), but the majority of the island is quite flat, and the northwest corner is home to many lagoons.

Between the months of August and October, the island is at risk of being hit by hurricanes. After Hurricane Irma, NASA satellite images showed "browning" of Barbuda and other Caribbean islands that had been hit by the storm. The images, captured by the Operational Land Imager (OLI) on the Landsat 8 satellite, show a primarily green-colored Barbuda on August 27, 2017, and brown-colored Barbuda on September 12, 2017. NASA provided several possible reasons for the browning, including green vegetation being ripped away by hurricane winds, as well as salt spray from the storm coating and desiccating tree leaves.

The climate is classified as tropical marine, which means that there is little seasonal temperature variation. In January and February, the coolest months, the average daily high temperature is 27 °C (81 °F), while in July and August, the warmest months, the average daily high is 30 °C (86 °F).

Barbuda is host to several rare and endemic species:

- Barbuda warbler (Setophaga subita) is a vulnerable species of bird endemic to Barbuda and is found nowhere else in the world.
- Antiguan racer (Alsophis antiguae) is among the rarest snakes in the world. It is endemic to Antigua and Barbuda and is found on both islands. The Lesser Antilles are home to four species of racers. All four have undergone severe range reductions; at least two subspecies are extinct, and another, A. antiguae, now occupies only 0.1% of its historical range.
- Griswold's ameiva (Ameiva griswoldi) is a species of lizard in the genus Ameiva. It is endemic to Antigua and Barbuda and is found on both islands.

Barbuda is host to several near-threatened bird species, including the West Indian whistling duck (Dendrocygna arborea), endemic to the Caribbean, and the white-crowned pigeon (Patagioenas leucocephala). Barbuda is also host to the Barbuda Bank tree anole (Anolis leachii), an anole endemic to the Caribbean, also known as the Antigua Bank tree anole or panther anole. Barbuda is also one of two islands in eastern Caribbean, along with Guiana Island, to host the European fallow deer (Dama dama dama), an important symbol of the island and of the entire country. Previously, Barbuda was host to the Barbudan muskrat (Megalomys audreyae), an extinct rodent formerly endemic to the island. The Barbudan muskrat may have gone extinct around 1500 AD. The Magnificent Frigate Bird Sanctuary, located in Codrington Lagoon, is one of the primary tourist destinations on Barbuda. Few predators exist here, making this Barbuda breeding area the most crucial worldwide for these threatened birds.

Drawings (petroglyphs) made by the Arawak or the Archaic People, Barbuda's first inhabitants, may be found inside Indian Cave. A sinkhole in the Barbuda Highlands, Darby Cave is located three and a half miles northeast of Codrington. The Darby Sink Hole has a diameter of more than 300 feet and is around 70 feet deep. Stalactites up to eight feet long have grown under the overhang on one side of the hole, which has been severely undercut. The palms, ferns, and lianas give the vegetation the appearance of a little rainforest. Two miles south of Darby Cave is Dark Cave. As evidenced by artifacts discovered nearby, the cave's tiny entrance opens into a large cavern with pools of water. These ponds were likely a source of water for Amerindian occupants. The blind shrimp, a rare kind of amphipod, and various species of bats can be found at Dark Cave. Five chambers make up the complex of Nicey Cave, and a collapsed roof part serves as the complex's rear entrance and skylight. Three inner chambers are separated by modest ceiling ridges, and there is an outside chamber that is immediately accessible from the outside. The cave's vast stalactites and stalagmites are covered in shattered stalactites on the cave floor, which is primarily made of sand. The cave also has a circular stone enclosure that is comparable to tortoise pens found on modern sites, although the enclosure's walls are too low to accommodate tortoises and it is located distant from natural light.

== Demographics ==
=== Ethnicity and immigration ===
1. African descendant (95.1%)
2. Mixed black and white (2.88%)
3. Other mixed (1.00%)
4. Hispanic (0.44%)
5. White (0.13%)
6. Indian (0.13%)
7. Syrian/Lebanese (0.13%)
8. Other (0.13%)
9. Unspecified (0.06%)

In 2011, Barbuda had a nearly homogeneous population with nine reported ethnic origins. The majority of the population identified as African (95.11%), followed by Mixed Black/White (2.88%), other Mixed (1.00%), Hispanic (0.44%), White (0.13%), Indian (0.13%), Syrian/Lebanese (0.13%), and other (0.13%). A small portion (0.06%) did not specify their ethnicity.

Regarding the countries of birth in Barbuda, over 18 different countries were represented in the 2011 census. The top five countries and territories contributing the largest number of people born outside Barbuda were Guyana (2.76%), Dominica (1.50%), Jamaica (1.19%), the United States (1.07%), and the United States Virgin Islands (0.63%).

Notably, Barbuda had a high proportion of its population (89.28%) born in Antigua and Barbuda, compared to St. John's which had a lower percentage (62.66%) of residents born in the country.

When looking at specific ethnic backgrounds based on the countries of birth, the data showed that a significant majority of people born in Antigua and Barbuda were of African descent (97.12%). Similarly, those born in Guyana (86.36%), Dominica (91.67%), the United States (88.24%), and Jamaica (100.00%) were predominantly of African descent. In contrast, those born in the United States Virgin Islands had a mixed background, with 70.00% being Mixed Black/White and only 30.00% being of African descent.

The total population of Barbuda in March 2025 was estimated to be 2,233.

=== Housing and lands ===
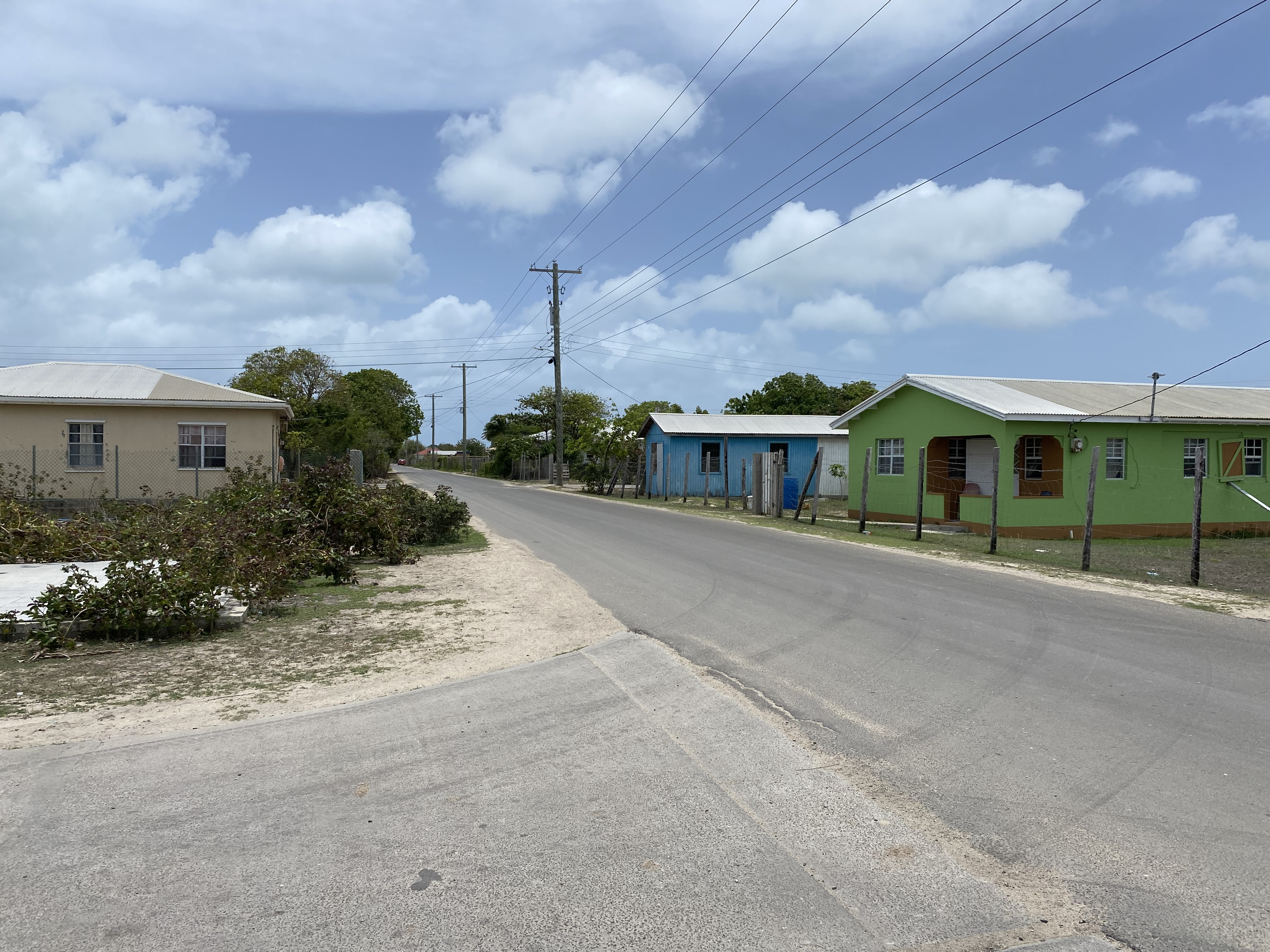
Concrete and wooden homes with metal roofs in Codrington

About 34.31% of Barbudan households consist of only one person, while 18.35% have two people, and 16.51% have three people; the remaining households have four or more people. The majority of homes (72.84%) use concrete/blocks as the main material for outer walling. Additionally, 12.48% of households use wood. In terms of dwelling types, 93.58% of homes are separate homes, and 3.49% are businesses and dwellings. Similar to most homes in Antigua and Barbuda, 93.76% of homes in Barbuda use sheet metal as the main roofing material, with an additional 3.12% using wood shingles. Moreover, 98.53% of homes are situated on owned/freeheld land, a result of the Barbuda Land Acts that establish a unique system of communal land ownership.

=== Education ===
67.46% of Barbuda's population across all age groups lacked any form of educational examination. The most common type of examination, achieved by 7.90% of individuals, was the GCE 'O' level/CXC General examination. Among those aged 18–59, the largest segment in the country at 50.95% had no level of examination. In comparison, Saint George had the lowest percentage of people aged 18–59 with no examination at 21.88%. Within this age group, 3.70% held a school leaving certificate, 5.16% possessed a high school certificate, 7.07% completed a Cambridge School/CXC examination, 13.69% passed a GCE 'O' level/CXC General examination, 0.79% obtained a GCE 'A' Levels or CAPE examination, 6.51% earned a college certificate, 2.81% had an associate degree, 2.13% held a bachelor's degree, 0.22% had a postgraduate diploma, 0.67% possessed a professional certificate, 0.34% held a master's or doctoral degree, and 5.95% either didn't know or didn't disclose their examination status.

=== Health ===
In 2011 the census reported health statistics for Barbuda. No cases of AIDS were documented, while 10.75% of the population had allergies, 6.58% had asthma, and 0.32% had cancer. Additionally, 6.45% of the population had diabetes, and no cases of HIV were reported. Among those with allergies, 92.94% were of African descent.

Regarding disabilities, 77.62% of the population had no disability, 16.87% had a disability with some difficulty, 4.83% had a disability with lots of difficulty or were unable to do certain things at all, and 0.69% did not state their disability status. Specific disability breakdowns included 193 people with vision disabilities, with 35.45% attributing it to old age and 22.75% to illness. Additionally, 68 people had a hearing disability, with 35.82% unaware of the cause and 26.87% attributing it to old age.

Moreover, 121 people had a walking disability, with 35.29% attributing it to illness, 29.41% to old age, and 15.97% to an accident. A total of 35 people had a self-care disability, with 38.24% unaware of the cause, 26.47% attributing it to illness, and 23.53% to "other" reasons. Lastly, 111 people had a remembering disability, with 33.94% attributing it to old age, 26.61% for unknown reasons, 14.68% to illness, 11.01% from birth, and 4.59% to an accident.

=== Youth ===
In 2011, 33.92% of Barbuda's population, totaling 551 individuals, were aged 0–17. The age distribution within this group was as follows: 10.91% (177) were aged 0–4, 10.03% (163) were aged 5–9, 7.52% (122) were aged 10–14, and 7.65% (124) were aged 15–19. Among those aged 0–4, 94.25% were of African descent, 2.87% were Mixed Black/White, and 2.87% were of other Mixed descent. All other youth age groups were predominantly African descendant or mixed.

=== Religion ===
In 2011, Barbuda reported 16 religious affiliations. The majority of the population identified as follows: 26.71% as Pentecostal, 17.66% as Anglican, 17.54% as Wesleyan Holiness, 11.94% as Baptist, 3.90% as irreligious, 3.77% as "other", and 3.39% as Rastafarian. The remaining affiliations were mostly Catholics, Jehovah's Witnesses, and Evangelicals.

== Economy ==
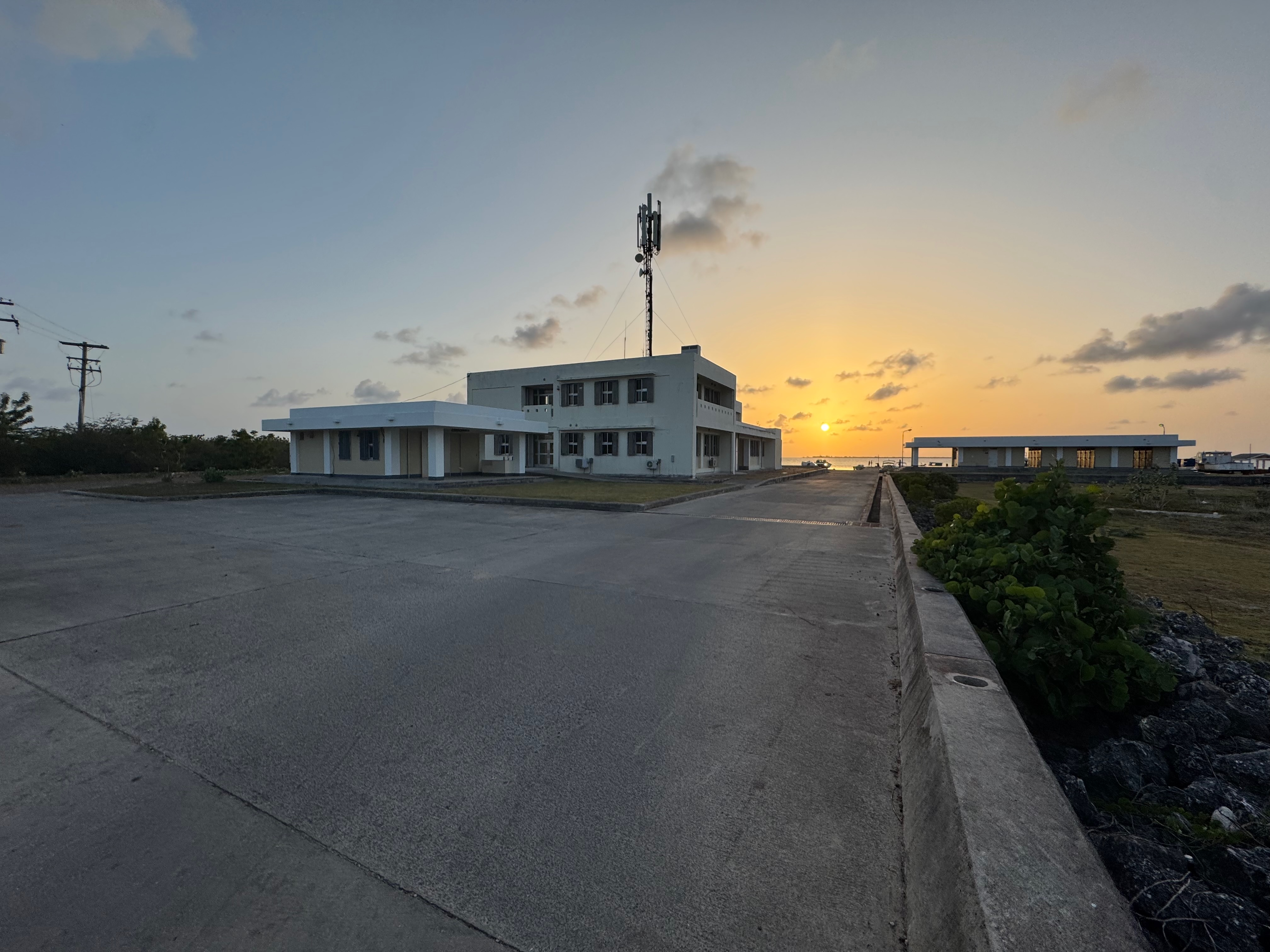
Fisheries complex in Codrington

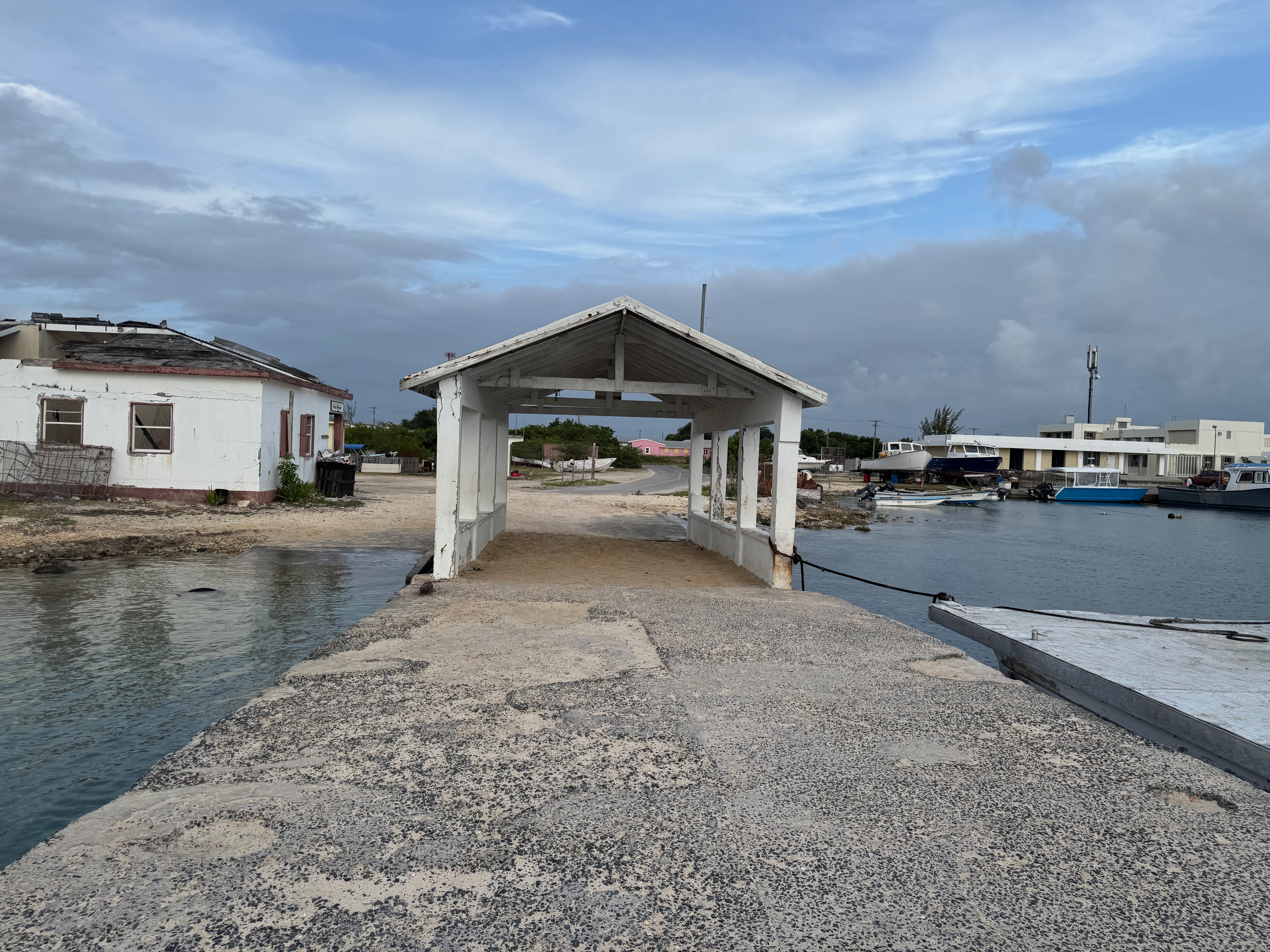
Middle Section area of Codrington, home to the tourism office, supermarkets, Barbuda Council administrative buildings, the sports complex, and public health departments

=== Business ===
In 2011, Barbuda had 94 business owners. The distribution of monthly earnings for these businesses was as follows: 26.09% earned less than $1,000 EC, 16.30% earned $1,000 to $1,999 EC, 15.22% earned $2,000 to $2,999 EC, 20.65% earned $3,000 to $4,999 EC, and 21.74% earned $5,000 EC or more. Among the business owners, 60 were men and 34 were women.

For businesses owned by men, the income distribution was: 27.12% earned under $1,000 EC, 15.25% earned $1,000 to $1,999 EC, 11.86% earned $2,000 to $2,999 EC, 25.42% earned $3,000 to $4,999 EC, and 20.34% earned $5,000 EC and over. For businesses owned by women, the income distribution was: 24.24% earned under $1,000 EC, 18.18% earned $1,000 to $1,999 EC, 21.21% earned $2,000 to $2,999 EC, 12.12% earned $3,000 to $4,999 EC, and 24.24% earned $5,000 EC and over.

=== Employment ===
In the 2011 census, 1,162 people were surveyed about their job status. The majority, 75.55%, were employed and actively working. Additionally, 9.99% were attending school, 7.10% were retired, and the remaining respondents were mostly unable to work.

Out of the 859 people queried about their workplace, 80.31% had a fixed place of work outside the home, 3.56% worked at home, 15.78% had no fixed place of work, and 0.36% either didn't know or didn't state their workplace.

Regarding employment types, 61.33% of workers were paid employees of the government, 3.68% worked for statutory bodies, 21.83% were private employees, 0.36% were private home employees, 3.08% were self-employed with paid employees, 8.66% were self-employed without paid employees, 0.59% had another worker status, and 0.47% either didn't know or didn't state their worker status. These figures were based on responses from the 859 individuals surveyed.

==== Job training ====
In 2011, a total of 486 individuals participated in, tried, or completed various types of training. Among them, 70.65% had successfully finished their training, 9.01% were still undergoing training, 17.61% had attempted training, and 2.73% were unsure or had not stated their status.

Breaking down the types of training, 50.10% of participants completed on-the-job training, 9.64% completed an apprenticeship, 1.89% completed a correspondence course, 1.05% completed secondary school job training, 24.32% completed vocational/technical/trade training, 0.21% completed commercial/secretarial training, 2.10% completed business/computer training, 4.19% completed university/campus training, 1.26% completed private study, 3.56% completed another type of training, and the remaining respondents either didn't know or didn't state their specific training type.

=== Tourism ===
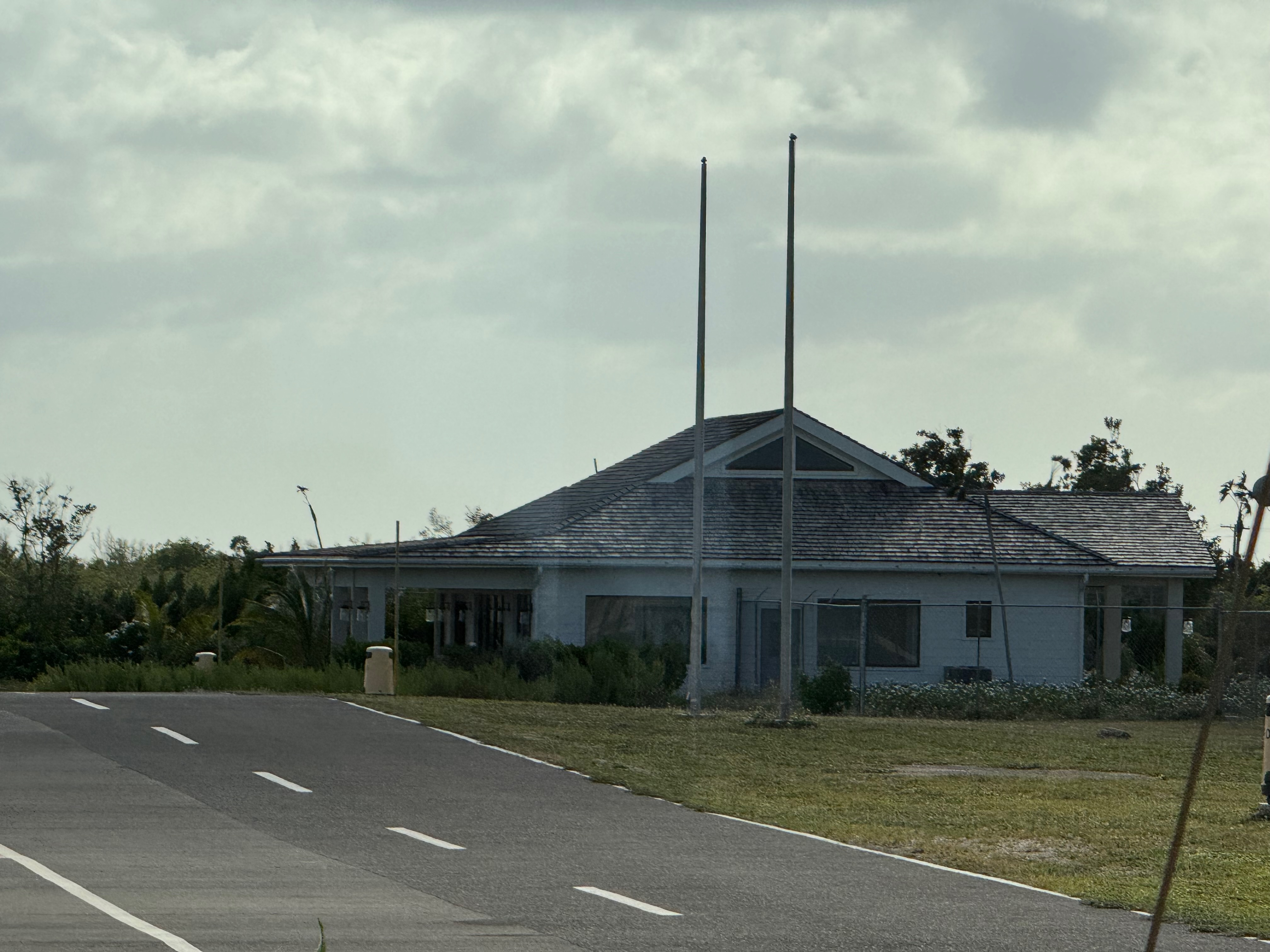
Private jet terminal at Burton–Nibbs International Airport

Barbuda's climate, pristine beaches, and geography have attracted tourists for many years. Tourism accounts for more than half Antigua and Barbuda's GDP, 40% of investment, and more than 46% of Antigua and Barbuda's national employment (directly and indirectly). Barbuda is served by Burton–Nibbs International Airport and also has a ferry service to Antigua. Popular outdoor activities for tourists include swimming, snorkeling, fishing, and caving.

The island has many popular attractions, both historical and ecological:

- Frigate Bird Sanctuary in the Codrington Lagoon
- Martello Tower, a 19th-century fort
- Indian Cave with its two rock-carved petroglyphs
- Pink Sand Beach
- Darby's Cave, a sinkhole with a tropical rain forest inside
- Highland House (called Willybob locally), the ruins of the 18th-century Codrington family home and the Dividing Wall that separated the wealthy family from its slaves.
- Fishing Creek Bay
- Taylor House

Years after Hurricane Luis, in August 2017, there were still only two operating resorts on the island, although plans were being made to build other resorts before Hurricane Irma.

== Culture ==
=== Festivals and sport ===
A Teenage Pageant, the Caribana Queen Show, calypso competitions, and weekend beach parties are typically part of the annual Barbuda Caribana Festival, which takes place in May, and occasionally in early June.

From an early age, students are encouraged to participate in sports in school. Two Barbuda Council employees have been designated to support sports in the local area. Since Irma, the basketball and tennis courts have been resurfaced. Athletics, cricket, and horse racing are quite popular, and there are year-round fishing competitions, a triathlon, and other sport activities.

Barbuda is home to an abundance of lobster, conchs, and other seafood that is responsibly harvested by low impact fishing techniques that have been developed over many generations there. Barbudans frequently go fishing for larger species including kingfish, dolphin or mahi mahi, tuna, and barracuda, which are captured and sold to the hotels throughout the season. In general, these larger fish do not contain the Ciguatera toxicity that limits their ingestion in other regions of the Caribbean. Large barracuda can be seen near to shore in the waters around the island and are eaten widely in Barbuda. All fishing in Barbuda's seas must be done aboard a vessel with a local fishing license.

Since the French, Spanish, and British fought each other for dominance of the Caribbean, there are hundreds of shipwrecks off the shore of Barbuda, dating from various periods in the island's history. The Marine Areas Act has identified and protected each one. Due to Barbuda being a relatively flat and "hard-to-see" island, there are even more contemporary boats that have lost their way onto the perilous reefs that encircle the island.

Occasionally, after 4 o'clock local time on Sundays, the Barbuda Turf Club (horse racing) gathers at the local track in the Spring View sector south of the airport. There are often four races, each featuring two or three horses.

The Barbuda tennis court was partially motivated by the success of the Anguilla professional tennis program and is open all day, every day to anyone who wishes to play tennis. School groups have utilized it for CXC sport exams, and there used to be a vibrant tennis association that worked hard to establish connections with Antigua to keep the sport alive on Barbuda and raise money through contributions. Barbuda has thus produced a few talented tennis players. Since the court was resurfaced after Hurricane Irma, this group has disbanded and a formal tennis program is now required, along with some new initiatives.

The floodlit basketball court is where the Vipers, Young Warriors, Rockers, Flip-mo, Boars, and Vikings teams compete in a league table structure, with the top teams moving on to the playoffs. The basketball season on Barbuda typically begins in August. Barbudans have experienced great success playing basketball internationally and have been signed by numerous institutions in the US and other nations.

The Antigua Barbuda Triathlon's Barbuda leg has rekindled interest in endurance sports on Barbuda.

=== Cuisine ===
While lobster is cooked directly from the sea, there are frequently individuals grilling on the street. Deer meat, land turtle, seafood (lobster, crab, conch), locally raised beef, lamb, or goat are some of the regional specialties. These meals are sometimes served with rice, fungi (similar to the Italian polenta), or dumplings, particularly yabba dumplings. Soursop, ginger beer, passion fruit, sea moss, tamarind, and other regional juices are among the drinks available. Fresh fish and lobster are frequently served on the street in cold boxes or at the fisheries pier as the boats dock most days between 2 and 4 pm local time. Although there is no market on Barbuda, local produce is occasionally sold in the Barbuda Council agriculture building, local fruit and vegetables are also sold on the street.

== See also ==
- Burton–Nibbs International Airport, the only public airport on Barbuda
- Sir McChesney George Secondary School, the only secondary school on Barbuda

== Citations ==
This article incorporates public domain material from the Government of Antigua and Barbuda.
