= Fair Antigua, We Salute Thee =

National anthem of Antigua and Barbuda

- National anthem of Antigua and Barbuda
- Lyrics: Novelle Richards, 1967
- Music: Walter P. Chambers, 1967
- Adopted: 1967
- Readopted: 1981

Audio sample
- U.S. Navy Band instrumental version (one verse) in B-flat major: file; help

"Fair Antigua, We Salute Thee" is the de facto national anthem of Antigua and Barbuda. Written by Novelle Richards and composed by Walter P. Chambers, it was adopted in 1967 while Antigua and Barbuda was still a British colony. It was adopted as the customary national anthem upon independence in 1981. Officially, the song is not mentioned in Antiguan and Barbudan legislation although in practice the song is performed during various official events.

== History ==
Prior to the adoption of a national anthem, due to the Crown Colony of Antigua being part of the British Empire, "God Save the Queen" was the official anthem. In 1967, "Fair Antigua, We Salute Thee" was composed with the lyrics written by the President of the Senate of Antigua and Barbuda, Novelle Richards and the music being composed by the church organist Walter P. Chambers. After Antigua changed its status to become an associated state as the Associated State of Antigua, "Fair Antigua, We Salute Thee" was de facto adopted as the national anthem with "God Save the Queen" being retained as the Royal anthem. In 1981, following full independence, the original melody was retained but the lyrics were changed.

The lyrics include the official national motto of Antigua and Barbuda of "Each endeavouring, all achieving", which is also on the country's coat of arms. During Independence Day celebrations, it is customary for Antiguan churches to sing "Fair Antigua, We Salute Thee" during services of thanksgiving.

== Lyrics ==
During official events, usually only the first verse is performed

I
Fair Antigua and Barbuda.
We thy sons and daughters stand
Strong and firm in peace or danger
To safeguard our native land
We commit ourselves to building
A true nation brave and free;
Ever striving, ever seeking,
Dwell in love and unity

II
Raise the standard! Raise it boldly!
Answer now to duty's call
To the service of thy country,
Sparing nothing, giving all;
Gird your loins and join the battle
'Gainst fear, hate and poverty,
Each endeavouring, all achieving,
Live in peace where man is free.

III
God of nations, let Thy blessings
Fall upon this land of ours;
Rain and sunshine ever sending,
Fill her fields with crops and flowers;
We her children do implore Thee,
Give us strength, faith, loyalty,
Never failing, all enduring
To defend her liberty.

== Former 1967-1981 lyrics ==
I

Fair Antigua, we salute thee,
Proudly we this anthem raise.
To thy glory and thy beauty,
Joyfully we sing the praise
Of the virtues, all bestowed
On thy sons and daughters free;
Ever striving, ever seeking,
Dwell in love and unity.

II

Raise the standard! Raise it boldly!
Answer now to duty’s call
To the service of thy country,
Sparing nothing, giving all.
Gird your loins and join the battle
’Gainst fear, hate and poverty,
Each endeavouring, all achieving,
Live in peace where man is free.

III

God of nations, let Thy blessing
Fall upon this land of ours;
Rain and sunshine ever sending,
Fill her fields with crops and flowers.
We, her children, do implore Thee,
Give us strength, faith, loyalty,
Never failing, all enduring,
To defend her liberty.
