= List of sovereign states in the 1970s =

This is a list of sovereign states in the 1970s, giving an overview of states around the world during the period between 1 January 1970 and 31 December 1979. It contains 191 entries, arranged alphabetically, with information on the status and recognition of their sovereignty. It includes 166 widely-recognized sovereign states (including 4 associated states that gained full independence, 4 states which were initially unrecognized but then gained full recognition later in the decade, and 1 state which was initially widely-recognized but then lost full recognition later in the decade), 2 constituent republics of another sovereign state that were UN members on their own right, 12 entities which claim an effective sovereignty but are considered de facto dependencies of other powers by the general international community, 4 associated states, and 7 transitional states.

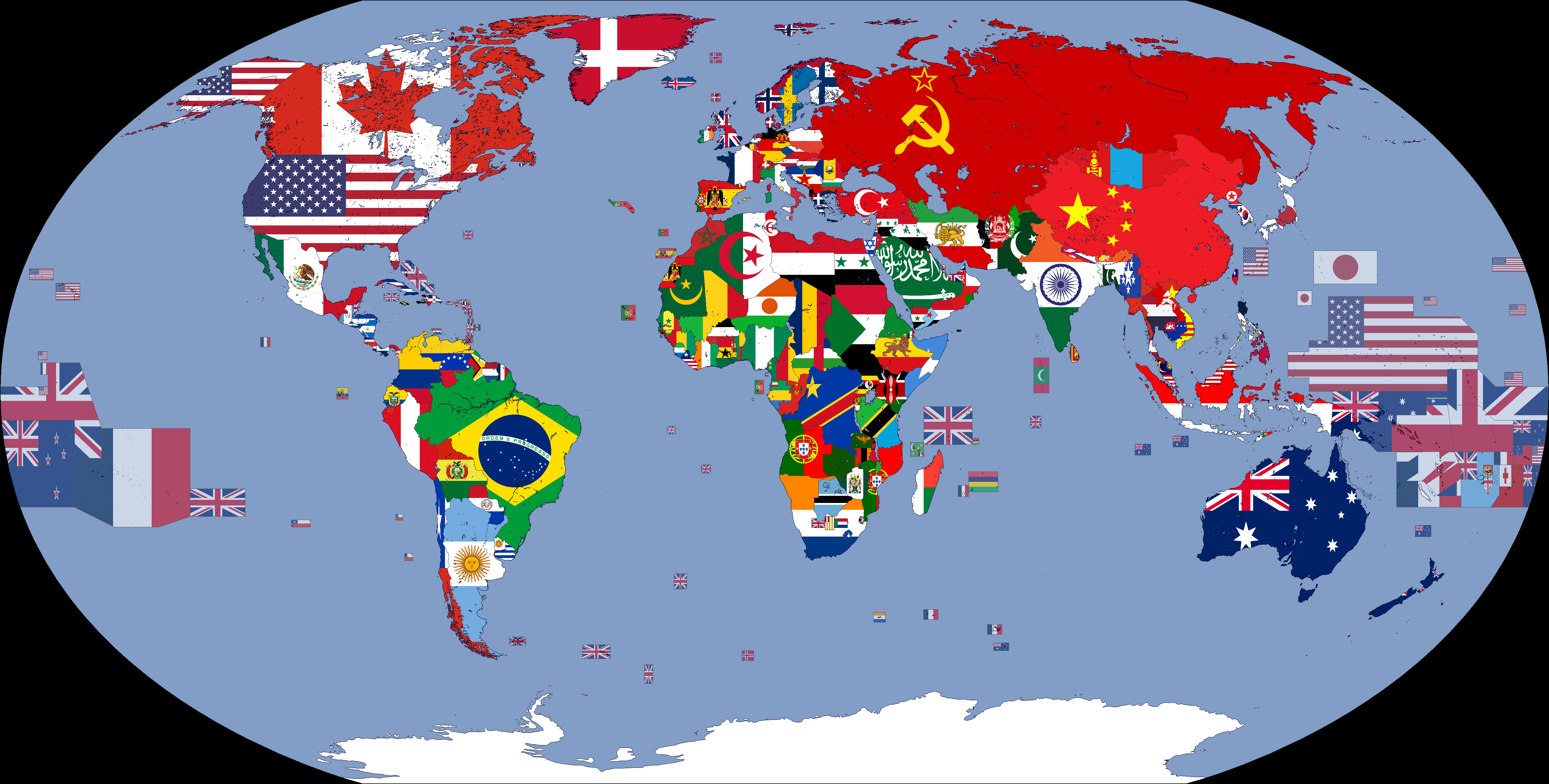
Map of the World in 1970

== Sovereign states ==
Name and capital city	Information on status and recognition of sovereignty
=== A ===
→ → → → Afghanistan; Capital: Kabul: Kingdom of Afghanistan (to 17 July 1973) (Note: Mohammed Daoud Khan overthrew Mohammed Zahir Shah on 17 July 1973 and proclaimed a new state known as the "Republic of Afghanistan".); Republic of Afghanistan (from 17 July 1973 to 30 April 1978) (Note: Following a coup d'etat on 27 April 1978, the Revolutionary Council of Afghanistan declared a new state called the "Democratic Republic of Afghanistan" with Nur Muhammad Taraki as its president.); Democratic Republic of Afghanistan (from 30 April 1978)	Widely-recognized UN member state; Afghanistan was occupied by the Soviet Union from 27 December 1979.
→ Albania; Capital: Tirana: People's Republic of Albania (to 28 December 1976) (Note: Albania adopted a new constitution on 28 December 1976.); People's Socialist Republic of Albania (from 28 December 1976)	Widely-recognized UN member state.
Algeria – People's Democratic Republic of Algeria; Capital: Algiers	Widely-recognized UN member state.
→ Andorra – Principality of Andorra; Capital: Andorra la Vella	Widely-recognized independent state; the President of France and Bishop of Urgell were ex officio Co-Princes of Andorra. The defense of Andorra was the responsibility of foreign states, in this case France and Spain.
Angola – People's Republic of Angola (from 11 November 1975) (Note: Angola gained independence from Portugal on 11 November 1975.); Capital: Luanda	Widely-recognized independent state; UN member state from 1 December 1976.
Antigua; Capital: St. John's	Associated state of the United Kingdom. Antigua had two dependencies, Barbuda (from 23 December 1976) and Redonda.
Argentina (Note: The name "Argentine Nation" was also used for the purposes of legislation.); Capital: Buenos Aires: Argentine Republic (to 24 March 1976); National Reorganization Process (from 24 March 1976)	Widely-recognized UN member state. Argentina was a federation of 22 provinces and two federal territories. It had a claim over Argentine Antarctica, which was suspended under the Antarctic Treaty. It also claimed the Falkland Islands and South Georgia and the South Sandwich Islands, both of which were British overseas territories.
Australia – Commonwealth of Australia; Capital: Canberra	Widely-recognized UN member state; Commonwealth realm. Australia was a federation of six states and three territories. It had sovereignty over the following external territories: Ashmore and Cartier Islands (from 1 July 1978); Australian Antarctic Territory (suspended under the Antarctic Treaty.); Christmas Island; Cocos (Keeling) Islands; Coral Sea Islands; Heard Island and McDonald Islands; Norfolk Island; Australia administered one United Nations Trust Territory: → → Papua and New Guinea (to 15 September 1975)
Austria – Republic of Austria; Capital: Vienna	Widely-recognized UN member state. Austria was a federation of nine states.
=== B ===
The Bahamas – Commonwealth of the Bahamas (from 10 July 1973) (Note: The Bahamas gained independence from the United Kingdom on 10 July 1973.); Capital: Nassau	Widely-recognized independent state; UN member state from 18 September 1973. Commonwealth realm.
→ Bahrain – State of Bahrain (from 15 August 1971) (Note: The British Protectorate over Bahrain came to an end on 15 August 1971.); Capital: Manama	Widely-recognized independent state; UN member state from 21 September 1971.
→ Bangladesh (from 26 March 1971) (Note: Bangladesh declared independence from Pakistan on 26 March 1971.); Capital: Dhaka: Provisional Government of Bangladesh (from 26 March 1971 to 17 January 1972); People's Republic of Bangladesh (from 17 January 1972)	De facto independent state. Claimed by Pakistan (to 22 February 1974). Permanent observer at the UN (from 1973 to 17 September 1974). Widely-recognized state (from 1973).
Barbados; Capital: Bridgetown	Widely-recognized UN member state; Commonwealth realm.
Belgium – Kingdom of Belgium; Capital: Brussels	Widely-recognized UN member state; EEC member.
Benin → Dahomey
Bhutan – Kingdom of Bhutan; Capital: Thimphu	Widely-recognized independent state. Permanent observer at the UN (to 21 September 1971). UN member state (from 21 September 1971). Bhutan was officially guided by India in its foreign affairs, but effectively pursued an independent foreign policy starting in the 1970s.
Bolivia – Republic of Bolivia; Capital: Sucre (official), La Paz (administrative)	Widely-recognized UN member state.
Botswana – Republic of Botswana; Capital: Gaborone	Widely-recognized UN member state.
Brazil – Federative Republic of Brazil; Capital: Brasília	Widely-recognized UN member state. Brazil was a federation of 22 states, four territories, and one federal district. (Note: 22 states: Acre, Alagoas, Amazonas, Bahia, Ceará, Espírito Santo, Goiás, Guanabara (to 15 March 1975), Maranhão, Mato Grosso, Mato Grosso do Sul (from 11 October 1977), Minas Gerais, Pará, Paraíba, Paraná, Pernambuco, Piauí, Rio Grande do Norte, Rio Grande do Sul, Rio de Janeiro, Santa Catarina, São Paulo, Sergipe. 4 territories: Amapá, Fernando de Noronha, Rondônia, Roraima). 1 federal district: Federal District.)
→ Bulgaria – People's Republic of Bulgaria; Capital: Sofia	Widely-recognized UN member state.
→ Burma; Capital: Rangoon: Union of Burma (to 3 January 1974) (Note: Burma adopted a new constitution on 3 January 1974.); Socialist Republic of the Union of Burma (from 3 January 1974)	Widely-recognized UN member state.
Burundi – Republic of Burundi; Capital: Bujumbura	Widely-recognized UN member state.
=== C ===
→ → → Cambodia / Khmer Republic / Kampuchea, Democratic; Capital: Phnom Penh: Kingdom of Cambodia (to 9 October 1970); Khmer Republic (from 9 October 1970 to 17 April 1975); Kampuchea (Kingdom of Cambodia) (from 17 April 1975 to 5 January 1976); Democratic Kampuchea (from 5 January 1976 to 10 January 1979) (Note: The constitution of Democratic Kampuchea was adopted on 5 January 1976.)	Widely-recognized UN member state. (Note: Although the People's Republic of Kampuchea had near total control over the territory of Cambodia from 10 January 1979 on, the majority of the states in the world recognized the former government of Democratic Kampuchea, which retained Cambodia's UN membership. The People's Republic of Kampuchea was mainly recognized by Vietnam and states within the Soviet sphere of influence.) Claimed to be the sole legitimate government of Kampuchea, despite being in exile from 10 January 1979.
→ Cameroon; Capital: Yaoundé: Federal Republic of Cameroon (to 2 June 1972) (Note: Cameroon adopted its constitution on 2 June 1972.); United Republic of Cameroon (from 2 June 1972)	Widely-recognized UN member state. Until 2 June 1972, Cameroon was a federation of two regions.
Canada – Dominion of Canada; Capital: Ottawa	Widely-recognized UN member state; Commonwealth realm. Canada was a federation of ten provinces and two territories.
Cape Verde – Republic of Cape Verde (from 5 July 1975) (Note: Cape Verde attained independence from Portugal on 5 July 1975.); Capital: Praia	Widely-recognized independent state. UN member state (from 16 September 1975).
Central African Republic / Central African Empire; Capital: Bangui: Central African Republic (to 4 December 1976) (Note: The Central African Empire was declared on 4 December 1976.); Central African Empire (from 4 December 1976 to 20 September 1979) (Note: The Central African Republic was restored on 20 September 1979.); Central African Republic (from 20 September 1979)	Widely-recognized UN member state.
→ Ceylon / Sri Lanka; Capital: Colombo (to 1978), Sri Jayawardenapura-Kotte (from 1978): Dominion of Ceylon (to 22 May 1972) (Note: Ceylon was declared a republic on 22 May 1972.); Free, Sovereign and Independent Republic of Sri Lanka (from 22 May 1972 to 7 September 1978) (Note: A new constitution for Sri Lanka came into effect on 7 September 1978.); Democratic Socialist Republic of Sri Lanka (from 7 September 1978)	Widely-recognized UN member state; Commonwealth realm (to 22 May 1972).
Chad – Republic of Chad; Capital: N'Djamena	Widely-recognized UN member state.
Chile – Republic of Chile; Capital: Santiago	Widely-recognized UN member state. It had a claim over Chilean Antarctic Territory, which was suspended under the Antarctic Treaty.
China, People's Republic of Capital: Beijing	Partially recognized de facto independent state. Widely-recognized UN member state. (Note: The People's Republic of China and the Republic of China did not recognize each other, as both states claimed to be the sole legitimate government of China. The following states recognized the PRC instead of the ROC: Afghanistan, Albania, Algeria, Argentina (from 19 February 1972), Australia (from 21 December 1972), Austria (from 28 May 1971), Bangladesh (from 4 October 1975), Barbados (from 30 May 1977), Belgium (from 25 October 1971), Botswana (from 6 January 1975), Brazil (from 15 August 1974), Bulgaria, Burma, Burundi (from 13 October 1971), Cambodia, Canada (from 13 October 1970), Cape Verde (from 25 April 1976), Central African Republic, Chad (from 28 November 1972), Chile (from 15 December 1970), Comoros (from 13 November 1975), Democratic Republic of Congo, Republic of Congo, Cuba, Cyprus (from 14 December 1972), Czechoslovakia, Dahomey (from 29 December 1972), Denmark, Djibouti (from 8 January 1979), Egypt, Equatorial Guinea (from 15 October 1970), Ethiopia (from 24 November 1970), Fiji (from 5 November 1975), Finland, France, Gabon (from 20 April 1974), the Gambia (from 14 December 1974), East Germany, West Germany (from 11 October 1972), Ghana, Greece (from 5 June 1972), Guinea, Guinea-Bissau (from 15 March 1974), Guyana (from 27 June 1972), Hungary, Iceland (from 8 December 1971), India, Indonesia, Iran (from 16 August 1971), Iraq, Ireland (from 22 June 1979), Italy (from 6 November 1970), Jamaica (from 21 November 1972), Japan (from 29 September 1972), Jordan (from 7 April 1977), Kenya, North Korea, Kuwait (from 22 March 1971), Laos, Lebanon (from 9 November 1971), Liberia (from 17 February 1977), Libya (from 9 August 1978), Liechtenstein, Luxembourg (from 16 November 1972), Madagascar (from 6 November 1972), Malaysia (from 31 May 1974), Maldives (from 14 October 1972), Mali, Malta (from 31 January 1972), Mauritania, Mauritius (from 15 April 1972), Mexico (from 14 February 1972), Mongolia, Morocco, Mozambique (from 25 June 1975), Nepal, Netherlands (recognition accepted on 18 March 1972), New Zealand (from 22 December 1972), Niger (from 20 July 1974), Nigeria (from 10 February 1970), Norway, Oman (from 25 May 1978), Pakistan, Papua New Guinea (from 12 October 1976), Peru (from 2 November 1971), Philippines (from 9 June 1975), Poland, Portugal (from 8 February 1979), Romania, Rwanda (from 12 November 1971), Samoa (from 6 November 1975), San Marino (from 6 May 1971), São Tomé and Príncipe (from 21 July 1975), Senegal (from 7 December 1971), Seychelles (from 30 June 1976), Sierra Leone (from 29 July 1971), Somalia, the Soviet Union, Spain (from 9 March 1973), Sri Lanka, Sudan, Suriname (from 28 May 1976), Sweden, Switzerland, Syria, Tanzania, Thailand (from 1 July 1975), Togo (from 19 September 1972), Trinidad and Tobago (from 20 June 1974), Tunisia, Turkey (from 4 August 1971) Uganda, the United Kingdom (recognition accepted on 13 March 1972), the United States (from 1 January 1979), Upper Volta (from 15 September 1973), Venezuela (from 28 June 1974), North Vietnam, North Yemen, South Yemen, Yugoslavia, and Zambia.) The People's Republic of China had five autonomous regions: Guangxi, Inner Mongolia, Ningxia, Xinjiang and Tibet. The People's Republic of China claimed Taiwan, Kinmen, the Matsu Islands, Pratas Island and the Vereker Banks, and Itu Aba, all of which were governed by the Republic of China. It also claimed the Paracel Islands (disputed by the Republic of China and Vietnam), the Spratly Islands (disputed by the Republic of China, Vietnam, the Philippines and Malaysia), and South Tibet (controlled by India). The People's Republic of China administered Aksai Chin and the Trans-Karakoram Tract, which were within the disputed region of Kashmir.
China, Republic of Capital: Taipei (seat of government), Nanjing (claimed)	De jure widely-recognized UN member state under the name "China". Partially recognized de facto independent state. Taiwan claimed to be the sole legitimate government of China, but only administered Taiwan, Kinmen, the Matsu Islands, Pratas Island and Itu Aba. The Republic of China had territorial claims over Mongolia; the Tuvan Autonomous Soviet Socialist Republic; the Sixty-Four Villages East of the River (administered by the Soviet Union); The majority of Gorno-Badakhshan (administered by the Soviet Union); The eastern tip of the Wakhan Corridor (administered by Afghanistan); a small portion of Gilgit-Baltistan (administered by Pakistan and part of the disputed Kashmir region); Aksai Chin (administered by the People's Republic of China and part of the disputed Kashmir region); eastern Bhutan; South Tibet (controlled by India); and Kachin State (administered by Burma).
Colombia – Republic of Colombia; Capital: Bogotá	Widely-recognized UN member state. Colombia claimed Quita Sueño Bank, Roncador Bank, and Serrana Bank (disputed by the United States); Bajo Nuevo Bank (disputed by Jamaica, Nicaragua and the United States); and Serranilla Bank (disputed by Nicaragua and the United States).
→ → Comoros (from 6 July 1975); Capital: Moroni: State of the Comoros (from 6 July 1975 to 1 October 1978) (Note: The Comoros became independent from France on 6 July 1975.) (Note: The Comoros enacted a new constitution on 1 October 1978.); Federal Islamic Republic of the Comoros (from 1 October 1978)	De facto independent state. Claimed by France to 31 December 1975. Widely-recognized UN member state from 12 November 1975. After 24 May 1978, the Comoros was a federation of three islands. 3 Islands: Anjouan, Grande Comore, Mohéli. Comoros claimed sovereignty over the French overseas territories of Mayotte and the Glorioso Islands. It also claimed Banc du Geyser (disputed by Madagascar and France).
→ Congo, Democratic Republic of the / Zaire; Capital: Kinshasa: Democratic Republic of the Congo (to 27 October 1971) (Note: The Democratic Republic of the Congo was renamed Zaire on 27 October 1961.); Republic of Zaire (from 27 October 1971)	Widely-recognized UN member state.
→ Congo, Republic of the / Congo; Capital: Brazzaville: Republic of the Congo (to 3 January 1970) (Note: Congo became a "People's Republic" on 3 January 1970.); People's Republic of the Congo (from 3 January 1970)	Widely-recognized UN member state.
Costa Rica – Republic of Costa Rica; Capital: San José	Widely-recognized UN member state.
Cuba – Republic of Cuba; Capital: Havana	Widely-recognized UN member state; the Cuban area of Guantánamo Bay was under the control of the United States.
Cyprus – Republic of Cyprus; Capital: Nicosia	Widely-recognized UN member state. (Note: Cyprus was not recognized by Turkey.) Cyprus included one self-declared state which, although it did not claim independence, was de facto self-governing: Turkish Federated State of Cyprus (from 13 February 1975)
Czechoslovakia – Czechoslovak Socialist Republic; Capital: Prague	Widely-recognized UN member state. (Note: Owing to a dispute over lands seized during World War II, Liechtenstein and Czechoslovakia did not recognize each other.) Czechoslovakia was a federation of two republics.
=== D ===
→ Dahomey / Benin; Capital: Porto-Novo (official), Cotonou (seat of government): Republic of Dahomey (to 30 November 1975) (Note: Dahomey was renamed Benin on 30 November 1975.); People's Republic of Benin (from 30 November 1975)	Widely-recognized UN member state.
Denmark – Kingdom of Denmark; Capital: Copenhagen	Widely-recognized UN member state; EEC member from 1 January 1973. The Danish Realm also included two of its constituent countries: Greenland (from 1 May 1979); Faroe Islands
Djibouti – Republic of Djibouti (from 27 June 1977) (Note: The French Territory of the Afars and the Issas gained independence as Djibouti on 27 June 1977.); Capital: Djibouti	Widely-recognized independent state; UN member state from 20 September 1977.
→ Dominica; Capital: Roseau: Dominica (to 2 November 1978); Commonwealth of Dominica (from 3 November 1978) (Note: Dominica gained independence from the United Kingdom on 3 November 1978.)	Associated state of the United Kingdom (to 2 November 1978). Widely-recognized independent state from 3 November 1978; UN member state from 18 December 1978.
Dominican Republic; Capital: Santo Domingo	Widely-recognized UN member state.
=== E ===
Ecuador; Capital: Quito: Republic of Ecuador (to 10 August 1979); Republic of Ecuador (from 10 August 1979)	Widely-recognized UN member state.
Egypt → United Arab Republic
El Salvador; Capital: San Salvador: Military dictatorship (to 15 October 1979); Revolutionary Government Junta (from 15 October 1979)	Widely-recognized UN member state.
→ → Equatorial Guinea – Republic of Equatorial Guinea; Capital: Malabo	Widely-recognized UN member state.
→ → Ethiopia; Capital: Addis Ababa: Ethiopian Empire (to 12 September 1974) (Note: Emperor Haile Selassie of Ethiopia was deposed by the Derg on 12 September 1974.); Provisional Military Government of Socialist Ethiopia (Derg) (from 12 September 1974)	Widely-recognized UN member state.
=== F ===
Fiji – Dominion of Fiji (from 10 October 1970) (Note: Fiji gained independence from the United Kingdom on 10 October 1970.); Capital: Suva	Widely-recognized independent state; UN member state from 13 October 1970. Commonwealth realm. Fiji had an autonomous dependency, Rotuma.
Finland – Republic of Finland; Capital: Helsinki	Widely-recognized UN member state. Finland had a neutral and demilitarized region: Åland
→ France – French Republic; Capital: Paris	Widely-recognized UN member state; EEC member. France included five overseas departments: French Guiana, Guadeloupe, Martinique, Réunion, and Saint Pierre and Miquelon (from 19 July 1976). It also had sovereignty over the following overseas territories: Comoros (to 24 December 1976) (Note: Comoros declared independence on 6 July 1975 and was recognized by France on 31 December 1975, but the island of Mayotte remained under French administration. A separate administration for Mayotte was not formally established until 24 December 1976.); French Afars and Issas (to 26 June 1977); French Polynesia, with one dependency: Clipperton Island; French Southern and Antarctic Lands (including a claim to Adélie Land which was suspended under the Antarctic Treaty.); Mayotte (from 24 December 1976); New Caledonia; Saint Pierre and Miquelon (to 19 July 1976); The Scattered Islands in the Indian Ocean, consisting of five uninhabited possessions: Bassas da India (disputed by Madagascar); Europa Island (disputed by Madagascar); Glorioso Islands (disputed by Madagascar, Comoros, and the Seychelles); Juan de Nova Island (disputed by Madagascar); Tromelin Island (disputed by Mauritius and the Seychelles); Wallis and Futuna; It also co-administered one condominium: New Hebrides (with the United Kingdom); France also claimed Banc du Geyser (disputed by Madagascar and the Comoros).
=== G ===
Gabon – Gabonese Republic; Capital: Libreville	Widely-recognized UN member state.
The Gambia; Capital: Banjul: The Gambia (to 24 April 1970) (Note: The Gambia became a republic on 24 April 1970.); Republic of the Gambia (from 24 April 1970)	Widely-recognized UN member state; Commonwealth realm (to 24 April 1970).
Germany, East – German Democratic Republic; Capital: East Berlin (disputed)	Widely-recognized independent state. Permanent observer at the UN (from 1972 to 18 September 1973). UN member state (from 18 September 1973).
Germany, West – Federal Republic of Germany; Capital: Bonn	Widely-recognized independent state; Permanent observer at the UN to 18 September 1973. UN member state from 18 September 1973; EEC member. West Germany was a federation of ten states.
Ghana; Capital: Accra: Second Republic of Ghana (to 4 June 1979); Third Republic of Ghana (from 4 June 1979)	Widely-recognized UN member state.
→ → → Greece; Capital: Athens: Kingdom of Greece (to 1 June 1973) (Note: King Constantine II of Greece was deposed by the Regime of the Colonels on 1 June 1973. The end of the monarchy was confirmed by plebiscite on 8 December 1974 and a new Republican constitution was enacted on 11 June 1975.); Hellenic Republic (from 1 June 1973)	Widely-recognized UN member state. Greece had sovereignty over Mount Athos, an autonomous monastic state that was jointly governed by the multi-national "Holy Community" on the mountain and the Civil Governor appointed by the Greek Ministry of Foreign Affairs, and spiritually came under the direct jurisdiction of the Ecumenical Patriarchate.
→ Grenada (Note: Grenada became independent from the United Kingdom on 7 February 1974.); Capital: St. George's: Grenada (to 13 March 1979); People's Revolutionary Government of Grenada (from 13 March 1979) (Note: The New Jewel Movement proclaimed the socialist republic on 13 March 1979.)	Associated state of the United Kingdom (to 6 February 1974). Widely-recognized independent state from 7 February 1974; UN member state from 17 September 1974. Commonwealth realm. Grenada had one autonomous dependency, Carriacou and Petite Martinique.
Guatemala – Republic of Guatemala; Capital: Guatemala City	Widely-recognized UN member state.
Guinea; Capital: Conakry: Republic of Guinea (to 20 November 1978); People's Revolutionary Republic of Guinea (from 20 November 1978)	Widely-recognized UN member state.
Guinea-Bissau – Republic of Guinea-Bissau (from 24 September 1973) (Note: Guinea-Bissau unilaterally declared independence from Portugal on 24 September 1973.); Capital: Madina do Boe (to 10 September 1974), Bissau (from 10 September 1974)	De facto independent state; claimed by Portugal to 10 September 1974. Widely-recognized from 10 September 1974; UN member state from 17 September 1974.
Guyana; Capital: Georgetown: Guyana (to 23 February 1970) (Note: Guyana became a republic on 23 February 1970.); Co-operative Republic of Guyana (from 23 February 1970)	Widely-recognized UN member state.
=== H ===
Haiti – Republic of Haiti; Capital: Port-au-Prince	Widely-recognized UN member state; Haiti claimed the uninhabited United States possession of Navassa Island.
Holy See → Vatican City
Honduras – Republic of Honduras; Capital: Tegucigalpa	Widely-recognized UN member state.
Hungary – People's Republic of Hungary; Capital: Budapest	Widely-recognized UN member state.
=== I ===
Iceland – Republic of Iceland; Capital: Reykjavík	Widely-recognized UN member state.
India – Republic of India; Capital: New Delhi	Widely-recognized UN member state. India was a federation of 22 states and 11 union territories. India had sovereignty over one protectorate: Sikkim (to 16 May 1975); Indian sovereignty over South Tibet, administered as part of North-East Frontier Agency and then Arunachal Pradesh from 1972 was disputed by the People's Republic of China. India administered part of the disputed region of Kashmir as the state of Jammu and Kashmir.
Indonesia – Republic of Indonesia; Capital: Djakarta (renamed Jakarta in 1972)	Widely-recognized UN member state. Indonesia's sovereignty over Timor Timur from 17 July 1976 was disputed and not widely recognized.
→ Iran; Capital: Tehran: Imperial State of Iran (to 11 February 1979) (Note: The Monarchy of Iran was abolished on 11 February 1979. The Islamic Republic was proclaimed on 1 April 1979.); Interim Government of Iran (from 11 February 1979 to 1 April 1979); Islamic Republic of Iran (from 1 April 1979)	Widely-recognized UN member state.
Iraq – Iraqi Republic; Capital: Baghdad	Widely-recognized UN member state.
Ireland (Note: Ireland also had the legal description of "Republic of Ireland", although this was not its constitutional name.); Capital: Dublin	Widely-recognized UN member state; EEC member from 1 January 1973.
Israel – State of Israel; Capital: Jerusalem	Widely-recognized UN member state. (Note: Israel was not recognized by Afghanistan, Algeria, Bahrain, Bangladesh, Chad, Cuba, Indonesia, Iran, Iraq, Jordan, Kuwait, Lebanon, Libya, Malaysia, North Korea, Pakistan, Saudi Arabia, Sudan, Syria, the United Arab Emirates, and Yemen.) Israel occupied the Gaza Strip the Golan Heights, the Sinai Peninsula, and the West Bank, including East Jerusalem. These areas were not recognized as being part of Israel.
Italy – Italian Republic; Capital: Rome	Widely-recognized UN member state; EEC member. Italy had 5 autonomous regions: Aosta Valley, Friuli-Venezia Giulia, Sardinia, Sicily, and Trentino-Alto Adige/Südtirol.
Ivory Coast – Republic of Ivory Coast; Capital: Abidjan	Widely-recognized UN member state.
=== J ===
Jamaica; Capital: Kingston	Widely-recognized UN member state; Commonwealth realm.
Japan; Capital: Tokyo	Widely-recognized UN member state.
Jordan – Hashemite Kingdom of Jordan; Capital: Amman	Widely-recognized UN member state. Jordan claimed the Israeli-occupied territories of West Bank, including East Jerusalem.
=== K ===
Kampuchea, Democratic → Cambodia
Kenya – Republic of Kenya; Capital: Nairobi	Widely-recognized UN member state.
Khmer Republic → Cambodia
Kiribati – Republic of Kiribati (from 12 July 1979) (Note: Kiribati gained independence from the United Kingdom on 12 July 1979.); Capital: South Tarawa	Widely-recognized independent state.
Korea, North – Democratic People's Republic of Korea; Capital: Seoul (de jure to 1972), Pyongyang (de facto to 1972, de jure from 1972)	Widely-recognized independent state. (Note: North Korea was not recognized by Estonia, France, Japan, or South Korea.) Permanent observer at the UN from 1973; claimed to be the sole legitimate government of Korea.
Korea, South - Republic of Korea; Capital: Seoul: Third Republic (to 21 November 1972); Fourth Republic (from 21 November 1972)	Widely-recognized independent state. (Note: South Korea was not recognized by the Soviet Union, China, Romania or North Korea.) Permanent observer at the UN; claimed to be the sole legitimate government of Korea.
Kuwait – State of Kuwait; Capital: Kuwait City	Widely-recognized UN member state.
=== L ===
→ Laos; Capital: Vientiane: Kingdom of Laos (to 2 December 1975) (Note: Savang Vatthana abdicated his throne on 2 December 1975.); Lao People's Democratic Republic (from 2 December 1975)	Widely-recognized UN member state.
Lebanon – Lebanese Republic; Capital: Beirut	Widely-recognized UN member state; Lebanon was occupied by Syria from 2 November 1975.
Lesotho – Kingdom of Lesotho; Capital: Maseru	Widely-recognized UN member state.
Liberia – Republic of Liberia; Capital: Monrovia	Widely-recognized UN member state.
→ → Libya; Capital: Tripoli: Libyan Arab Republic (to 2 March 1977) (Note: The Socialist People's Libyan Arab Jamahiriya was declared on 2 March 1977.); Socialist People's Libyan Arab Jamahiriya (from 2 March 1977)	Widely-recognized UN member state; Federation of Arab Republics member from 17 April 1971 to November 1977.
Liechtenstein; Capital: Vaduz	Widely-recognized independent state. The defense of Liechtenstein was the responsibility of Switzerland.
Luxembourg – Grand Duchy of Luxembourg; Capital: Luxembourg	Widely-recognized UN member state; EEC member.
=== M ===
Malagasy Republic / Madagascar; Capital: Antananarivo: Malagasy Republic (to 30 December 1975) (Note: Madagascar adopted a new constitution on 30 December 1975.); Democratic Republic of Madagascar (from 30 December 1975)	Widely-recognized UN member state. Madagascar claimed the French possessions of Bassas da India, Europa Island, Glorioso Islands and Juan de Nova Island. It also claimed Banc du Geyser, which was disputed by Comoros and France.
Malawi – Republic of Malawi; Capital: Lilongwe	Widely-recognized UN member state.
Malaysia; Capital: Kuala Lumpur	Widely-recognized UN member state. Malaysia was a federation of thirteen states and one federal territory.
Maldives – Republic of Maldives; Capital: Malé	Widely-recognized UN member state.
Mali – Republic of Mali; Capital: Bamako	Widely-recognized UN member state.
Malta; Capital: Valletta: State of Malta (to 13 December 1974) (Note: Malta became a republic on 13 December 1974.); Republic of Malta (from 13 December 1974)	Widely-recognized UN member state; Commonwealth realm (to 13 December 1974).
Mauritania – Islamic Republic of Mauritania; Capital: Nouakchott	Widely-recognized UN member state. From 26 February 1976 to 11 August 1979, Mauritania claimed sovereignty over and controlled a portion of the disputed Western Sahara. The territory was home to the de facto independent Sahrawi Arab Democratic Republic from 27 February 1976.
Mauritius; Capital: Port Louis	Widely-recognized UN member state; Commonwealth realm. Mauritius had three dependencies: Agalega Islands, Cargados Carajos and Rodrigues. It claimed the British Indian Ocean Territory and the French territory of Tromelin Island.
Mexico – United Mexican States; Capital: Mexico City	Widely-recognized UN member state. Mexico was a federation of 31 states, two territories, and one federal district.
Monaco – Principality of Monaco; Capital: Monaco	Widely-recognized independent state. Permanent observer at the UN. The defense of Monaco was the responsibility of France.
Mongolia – Mongolian People's Republic; Capital: Ulaanbaatar	Widely-recognized UN member state.
Morocco – Kingdom of Morocco; Capital: Rabat	Widely-recognized UN member state. After 26 February 1976, Morocco claimed sovereignty over and controlled most of the disputed Western Sahara. The territory was home to the de facto independent Sahrawi Arab Democratic Republic from 27 February 1976. Morocco disputed the Spanish sovereignty over Ceuta, Isla de Alborán, Isla Perejil, Islas Chafarinas, Melilla, and Peñón de Alhucemas.
Mozambique – People's Republic of Mozambique (from 25 June 1975) (Note: Mozambique declared independence from Portugal on 25 June 1975.); Capital: Maputo	Widely-recognized independent state; UN member state from 16 September 1975.
→ Muscat and Oman / Oman; Capital: Muscat, Oman: Sultanate of Muscat and Oman (to 9 August 1970); Sultanate of Oman (from 9 August 1970)	Widely-recognized independent state. UN member state (from 7 October 1971). Under the informal protection of the United Kingdom until 1971.
=== N ===
Nauru – Republic of Nauru; Capital: Yaren (unofficial)	Widely-recognized independent state; the defense of Nauru was the responsibility of Australia.
Nepal – Kingdom of Nepal; Capital: Kathmandu	Widely-recognized UN member state.
Netherlands – Kingdom of the Netherlands; Capital: Amsterdam (official), The Hague (seat of government)	Widely-recognized UN member state. The Kingdom of the Netherlands consisted of three autonomous countries: Netherlands; Netherlands Antilles; Suriname (to 24 November 1975); The Kingdom of the Netherlands as a whole was a member of the EEC.
New Zealand – Dominion of New Zealand; Capital: Wellington	Widely-recognized UN member state; Commonwealth realm. New Zealand had responsibilities for the two free associated states of: → Cook Islands; Niue (from 19 October 1974); It also had sovereignty over three dependent territories: Niue (to 19 October 1974); Ross Dependency (suspended under the Antarctic Treaty); Tokelau Islands (renamed Tokelau on 9 December 1976); The government of Tokelau Islands(Tokelau) claimed Swains Island, part of American Samoa (a US dependency).
→ Nicaragua; Capital: Managua: Republic of Nicaragua (to 17 July 1979); Junta of National Reconstruction (from 17 July 1979)	Widely-recognized UN member state.
Niger – Republic of Niger; Capital: Niamey	Widely-recognized UN member state.
Nigeria; Capital: Lagos: Military dictatorship (to 1 October 1979); Second Nigerian Republic (from 1 October 1979)	Widely-recognized UN member state. Nigeria was a federation of 23 states and one federal territory.
Norway – Kingdom of Norway; Capital: Oslo	Widely-recognized UN member state. Norway had two integral overseas areas: Jan Mayen and Svalbard. The latter of area had a special status due to the Spitsbergen Treaty. Norway had sovereignty over the following dependencies: Bouvet Island; Peter I Island (suspended under the Antarctic Treaty); Queen Maud Land (suspended under the Antarctic Treaty)
=== O ===
Oman → Muscat and Oman
=== P ===
Pakistan – Islamic Republic of Pakistan; Capital: Islamabad	Widely-recognized UN member state. Pakistan was a federation of six provinces and three territories. It administered part of the disputed region of Kashmir as the territories of Azad Kashmir and the Northern Areas.
Panama – Republic of Panama; Capital: Panama City	Widely-recognized UN member state.
Papua New Guinea – Independent State of Papua New Guinea (from 16 September 1975) (Note: Papua New Guinea gained independence from an Australian-administered UN Trusteeship on 16 September 1975.); Capital: Port Moresby	Widely-recognized independent state; UN member state from 10 October 1975. Commonwealth realm.
Paraguay – Republic of Paraguay; Capital: Asunción	Widely-recognized UN member state.
Peru – Peruvian Republic; Capital: Lima	Widely-recognized UN member state.
Philippines – Republic of the Philippines; Capital: Quezon City (official, to 24 June 1976) Manila (official, from 24 June 1976), Baguio (summer, to 24 June 1976)	Widely-recognized UN member state. The Philippines administered Scarborough Shoal, which was disputed by China and Taiwan. It also claimed sovereignty over the Spratly Islands (disputed by China, Taiwan, Vietnam, and Malaysia) and the Malaysian territory of Sabah.
Poland – Polish People's Republic; Capital: Warsaw	Widely-recognized UN member state. Poland's government was still in exile.
Portugal; Capital: Lisbon: Second Portuguese Republic (to 24 April 1974); National Salvation Junta (from 25 April 1974 to 14 March 1975); Third Portuguese Republic (from 14 March 1975)	Widely-recognized UN member state. Portugal had two autnonomous regions: the Azores (from 27 August 1976) and Madeira (from 27 August 1976). Portugal had sovereignty over the following overseas provinces: Angola (to 10 November 1975); Cape Verde Islands (to 19 December 1974); Macau (to 17 February 1976); Mozambique (to 24 June 1975); Portuguese Guinea (to 10 September 1974); Portuguese Timor (to 28 November 1975); São Tomé and Príncipe (to 11 July 1975); It had one autonomous republic: Republic of Cape Verde (from 19 December 1974 to 4 July 1975); It also had one Chinese territory which it administered as a dependency: Macau (from 17 February 1976); Portugal continued to claim sovereignty over Portuguese Timor after its unilateral declaration of independence on 28 November 1975 and its occupation by Indonesia on 7 December 1975. It claimed the former overseas province of Portuguese India, which had been annexed by India, until 31 December 1974. It also claimed the Spanish municipalities of Olivenza and Táliga.
=== Q ===
Qatar – State of Qatar (from 3 September 1971) (Note: Qatar gained independence from the United Kingdom on 3 September 1971.); Capital: Doha	Widely-recognized independent state; UN member state from 21 September 1971.
=== R ===
Romania – Socialist Republic of Romania; Capital: Bucharest	Widely-recognized UN member state.
Rwanda (Note: Rwanda's official French name was "République rwandaise". It could be translated into English as "Rwandese Republic", "Rwandan Republic", or "Republic of Rwanda"); Capital: Kigali: Rwandese Republic (to July 5, 1973); Military rule in Rwanda (from July 5, 1973)	Widely-recognized UN member state.
=== S ===
→ Saint Lucia (Note: Saint Lucia gained independence from the United Kingdom on 22 February 1979.); Capital: Castries	Associated state of the United Kingdom (to 21 February 1979). Widely-recognized independent state from 22 February 1979; UN member state from 18 September 1979. Commonwealth realm.
→ Saint Vincent and the Grenadines; Capital: Kingstown: Saint Vincent (to 26 October 1979); Saint Vincent and the Grenadines (from 27 October 1979) (Note: Saint Vincent and the Grenadines gained independence from the United Kingdom on 27 October 1979.)	Associated state of the United Kingdom to 26 October 1979. Widely-recognized independent state from 27 October 1979; Commonwealth realm.
San Marino – Republic of San Marino; Capital: San Marino	Widely-recognized independent state.
São Tomé and Príncipe – Democratic Republic of São Tomé and Príncipe (from 12 July 1975) (Note: São Tomé and Príncipe gained independence from Portugal on 12 July 1975.); Capital: São Tomé	Widely-recognized independent state. UN member state (from 16 September 1975).
→ Saudi Arabia – Kingdom of Saudi Arabia; Capital: Riyadh	Widely-recognized UN member state.
Senegal – Republic of Senegal; Capital: Dakar	Widely-recognized UN member state.
→ Seychelles (from 29 June 1976) (Note: The Seychelles gained independence from the United Kingdom on 29 June 1976.); Capital: Victoria: Republic of Seychelles (from 29 June 1976 to 4 June 1977); Republic of Seychelles (from 4 June 1977)	Widely-recognized independent state. UN member state (from 21 September 1976). The Seychelles claimed the British Indian Ocean Territory and the French territories of Tromelin Island and the Glorioso Islands.
Sierra Leone; Capital: Freetown: Sierra Leone (to 19 April 1971) (Note: Sierra Leone became a republic on 19 April 1971.); Republic of Sierra Leone (from 19 April 1971)	Widely-recognized UN member state; Commonwealth realm (to 19 April 1971).
Singapore – Republic of Singapore; Capital: Singapore	Widely-recognized UN member state.
Solomon Islands (from 7 July 1978) (Note: The Solomon Islands gained independence from the United Kingdom on 7 July 1978.); Capital: Honiara	Widely-recognized independent state. UN member state (from 19 September 1978). Commonwealth realm.
Somalia – Somali Democratic Republic; Capital: Mogadishu	Widely-recognized UN member state.
South Africa – Republic of South Africa; Capital: Pretoria (administrative), Cape Town (legislative), Bloemfontein (judicial)	Widely-recognized UN member state. South Africa had eight autonomous bantustans: Bophuthatswana (from 1 June 1972 to 6 December 1977); Ciskei (from 1 August 1972); Gazankulu (from 1 February 1973); KwaZulu (from 1 February 1977); Lebowa (from 2 October 1972); Transkei (to 26 October 1976); QwaQwa (from 1 November 1974); Venda (from 1 February 1973 to 13 September 1979); There were three bantustans which were nominally independent: Bophuthatswana (from 6 December 1977); Transkei (from 26 October 1976); Venda (from 13 September 1979); South Africa administered one League of Nations mandate: South-West Africa
Soviet Union – Union of Soviet Socialist Republics; Capital: Moscow	Widely-recognized UN member state. The Soviet Union was a federation of 15 republics, two of which (Byelorussia and Ukraine) were UN members in their own right.
→ Spain; Capital: Madrid: Spanish State (to 20 November 1975); Transitional Spanish Kingdom (from 20 November 1975) (Note: Spain enacted a new constitution on 29 December 1978.)	Widely-recognized UN member state. Spain included two autonomous communities. Spain had sovereignty over one overseas province: Spanish Sahara (to 26 February 1976); Its sovereignty over Ceuta, Isla de Alborán, Isla Perejil, Islas Chafarinas, Melilla, and Peñón de Alhucemas was disputed by Morocco. Its sovereignty over Olivenza and Táliga was disputed by Portugal; it claimed the British overseas territory of Gibraltar.
Sri Lanka → Ceylon
→ Sudan – Democratic Republic of the Sudan; Capital: Khartoum	Widely-recognized UN member state.
Suriname – Republic of Suriname (from 25 November 1975) (Note: Suriname gained independence from the Netherlands on 25 November 1975.); Capital: Paramaribo	Widely-recognized independent state; UN member state from 4 December 1975.
Swaziland – Kingdom of Swaziland; Capital: Mbabane (administrative), Lobamba (royal and legislative)	Widely-recognized UN member state.
Sweden – Kingdom of Sweden; Capital: Stockholm	Widely-recognized UN member state.
Switzerland – Swiss Confederation; Capital: Bern	Widely-recognized independent state; permanent observer at the UN. Switzerland was a federation of 26 cantons.
→ Syria – Syrian Arab Republic; Capital: Damascus	Widely-recognized UN member state; Federation of Arab Republics member from 17 April 1971 to November 1977. Syria included the Israeli-occupied Golan Heights and disputed Turkey's sovereignty over Hatay Province.
=== T ===
Tanzania – United Republic of Tanzania; Capital: Dar es Salaam	Widely-recognized UN member state. Tanzania had one autonomous region: Zanzibar.
Thailand – Kingdom of Thailand; Capital: Bangkok	Widely-recognized UN member state.
Togo – Togolese Republic; Capital: Lomé	Widely-recognized UN member state.
Tonga – Kingdom of Tonga (from 4 June 1970) (Note: Tonga gained independence from the United Kingdom on 4 June 1970.); Capital: Nukuʻalofa	Widely-recognized independent state.
Trinidad and Tobago; Capital: Port of Spain: Trinidad and Tobago (to 1 August 1976) (Note: Trinidad and Tobago became a republic on 1 March 1976.); Republic of Trinidad and Tobago (from 1 August 1976)	Widely-recognized UN member state; Commonwealth realm (to 1 August 1976).
Tunisia – Tunisian Republic; Capital: Tunis	Widely-recognized UN member state.
Turkey – Republic of Turkey; Capital: Ankara	Widely-recognized UN member state.
Tuvalu (from 1 October 1978) (Note: Tuvalu became independent from the United Kingdom on 1 October 1978.); Capital: Funafuti	Widely-recognized independent state; Commonwealth realm.
=== U ===
Uganda; Capital: Kampala: First Republic of Uganda (to 25 January 1971); Second Republic of Uganda (from 25 January 1971 to 13 April 1979); Third Republic of Uganda (from 13 April 1979)	Widely-recognized UN member state.
United Arab Emirates (from 2 December 1971) (Note: Abu Dhabi, Dubai, Sharjah, Ajman, Umm al-Quwain, and Fujairah became fully independent states when the British protectorate over the Trucial States came to an end on 1 December 1971. The next day, they united to form the United Arab Emirates.); Capital: Abu Dhabi	Widely-recognized independent state; UN member state from 9 December 1971. The United Arab Emirates was a federation of seven emirates.
→ United Arab Republic / Egypt; Capital: Cairo: United Arab Republic (to 2 September 1971); Arab Republic of Egypt (from 2 September 1971)	Widely-recognized UN member state; Federation of Arab Republics member from 17 April 1971 to November 1977. to The United Arab Republic consisted of one state: Egypt. It included the Sinai Peninsula, which was occupied by Israel.
United Kingdom – United Kingdom of Great Britain and Northern Ireland; Capital: London	Widely-recognized UN member state; Commonwealth realm and EEC member from 1 January 1973. The United Kingdom was composed of four constituent countries: England, Northern Ireland, Scotland, and Wales. The United Kingdom had responsibilities for the following self-governing free associated states: Antigua, with two dependencies: Barbuda (from 23 December 1976); Redonda; Dominica (to 2 November 1978); Grenada (to 6 February 1974); Saint Christopher-Nevis-Anguilla; Saint Lucia (to 21 February 1979); Saint Vincent (to 26 October 1979); The United Kingdom administered the foreign affairs of the following protected states: Bahrain (to 15 August 1971); Brunei; → Qatar (to 3 September 1971); Tonga (to 3 June 1970); Trucial States (to 1 December 1971), consisting of seven protected states: Abu Dhabi; Ajman; Dubai; Fujairah; Ras al-Khaimah; Sharjah; Umm al-Quwain; The United Kingdom co-administered the following condominiums: Canton and Enderbury Islands (to 1 January 1975, with the United States) (Note: The United Kingdom considered the Canton and Enderbury Islands to be part of its Gilbert Islands colony from 1 January 1975. The United States continued to claim the islands until 20 September 1979.); New Hebrides (with France); It also had sovereignty over the following crown colonies and protectorates: Bahamas (to 9 July 1973); Bermuda; British Antarctic Territory (suspended under the Antarctic Treaty); British Honduras (renamed Belize on 1 June 1973); British Indian Ocean Territory (disputed by Mauritius and the Seychelles); British Solomon Islands (to 6 July 1978); British Virgin Islands; Cayman Islands; Ellice Islands (from 1 January 1976 to 30 September 1978); Falkland Islands (disputed by Argentina), with one dependency; Falkland Islands Dependencies; Fiji (to 9 October 1970), with one dependency; Rotuma; Gibraltar; Gilbert and Ellice Islands (to 1 January 1976); Gilbert Islands (from 1 January 1976 to 11 July 1979); Hong Kong; Montserrat; Pitcairn Islands; Saint Helena, with two dependencies; Ascension Island; Tristan da Cunha; Seychelles (to 28 June 1976); Southern Rhodesia (from 12 December 1979); Sovereign Base Areas of Akrotiri and Dhekelia; Turks and Caicos Islands; In addition, the British Monarch had direct sovereignty over three self-governing Crown dependencies: Guernsey, with two dependencies: Alderney; Sark; Isle of Man; Jersey
United States – United States of America; Capital: Washington, D.C.	Widely-recognized UN member state. The United States was a federation of 50 states, one federal district, and one incorporated territory. It asserted sovereignty over the following inhabited unincorporated territories: American Samoa (including Swains Island, disputed by Tokelau); Guam; Panama Canal Zone (to 30 September 1979); Puerto Rico; United States Virgin Islands; The United States co-administered the following condominium: Canton and Enderbury Islands (to 20 September 1979, with the United Kingdom); The United States administered one territory under the residual sovereignty of Japan: Ryukyu Islands (to 14 May 1972); In addition, the United States administered one United Nations Trust Territory: Trust Territory of the Pacific Islands, including three territories: Marshall Islands (from 1 May 1979); Federated States of Micronesia (from 10 May 1979); → Northern Mariana Islands (from 9 January 1978)
Upper Volta – Republic of Upper Volta; Capital: Ouagadougou	Widely-recognized UN member state.
Uruguay; Capital: Montevideo: Eastern Republic of Uruguay (to 27 June 1973); Civic-military dictatorship (from 27 June 1973)	Widely-recognized UN member state.
=== V ===
Vatican City – Vatican City State; Capital: Vatican City	Widely-recognized independent state. Vatican City was administered by the Holy See, a sovereign entity recognized by a large number of countries and a Permanent observer at the United Nations. The Holy See also administered a number of extraterritorial properties in Italy; the Pope was the ex officio head of state of Vatican City.
Venezuela – Republic of Venezuela; Capital: Caracas	Widely-recognized UN member state. Venezuela was a federation of 20 states, two territories, one federal dependency, and one federal district.
Vietnam – Socialist Republic of Vietnam (from 2 July 1976) (Note: North Vietnam and South Vietnam united to form the Socialist Republic of Vietnam on 2 July 1976.); Capital: Hanoi	Widely-recognized independent state. Permanent observer at the UN (from 2 July 1976 to 20 September 1977). UN member state (from 20 September 1977). Vietnam claimed sovereignty over the Paracel Islands (disputed by China and Taiwan) and Spratly Islands (disputed by China, Taiwan, the Philippines, and Malaysia).
Vietnam, North – Democratic Republic of Vietnam (to 2 July 1976); Capital: Hanoi	Widely-recognized independent state; permanent observer at the UN from 30 April 1975 to 2 July 1976.
→ Vietnam, South; Capital: Saigon: Republic of Vietnam (to 30 April 1975) (Note: Saigon fell to the North Vietnamese on 30 April 1975, leading to the establishment of the Republic of South Vietnam.); Republic of South Vietnam (from 30 April 1975 to 2 July 1976)	Widely-recognized independent state to 30 April 1975; permanent observer at the UN to 30 April 1975. South Vietnam claimed sovereignty over the Paracel Islands (disputed by China and Taiwan) and Spratly Islands (disputed by China, Taiwan, and the Philippines).
=== W ===
Western Samoa – Independent State of Western Samoa; Capital: Apia	Widely-recognized independent state; UN member state from 15 December 1976.
=== Y ===
Yemen, North – Yemen Arab Republic; Capital: Sana'a	Widely-recognized UN member state.
Yemen, South; Capital: Aden: People's Republic of South Yemen (to 1 December 1970) (Note: South Yemen was renamed on 1 December 1970.); People's Democratic Republic of Yemen (from 1 December 1970)	Widely-recognized UN member state.
Yugoslavia – Socialist Federal Republic of Yugoslavia; Capital: Belgrade	Widely-recognized UN member state; Yugoslavia was a federation of six republics.
=== Z ===
Zaire → Congo, Democratic Republic of
Zambia – Republic of Zambia; Capital: Lusaka	Widely-recognized UN member state.
Zimbabwe Rhodesia → Rhodesia
== Transitional States and states with limited sovereignty, recongition or independence ==
Abu Dhabi – Emirate of Abu Dhabi (from 1 December 1971 to 2 December 1971); Capital: Abu Dhabi	Transitional independent state.
Ajman – State of Ajman (from 1 December 1971 to 2 December 1971); Capital: Ajman	Transitional independent state.
Biafra – Republic of Biafra (to 12 January 1970) (Note: Biafra surrendered to Nigeria on 12 January 1970.); Capital: Enugu	Partially recognized de facto independent state; (Note: Recognized by Gabon, Ivory Coast, Tanzania, and Zambia.) claimed by Nigeria.
Bophuthatswana – Republic of Bophuthatswana (from 6 December 1977) (Note: Bophuthatswana was declared independent on 6 December 1977.); Capital: Mmabatho	Nominally independent South African bantustan. (Note: The nominally independent bantustans of Bophuthatswana, Transkei, and Venda were only recognized by South Africa and by each other. The rest of the world regarded them as part of South Africa.)
Cabinda – Republic of Cabinda (from 1 August 1975 to 11 November 1975) (Note: Cabinda declared independence from the Portuguese overseas province Angola on 1 August 1975. It was annexed by the independent state of Angola on 11 November 1975.); Capital: Cabinda	De facto independent state. Claimed by Portugal (to 11 November 1975) and Angola (on 11 November 1975).
→ → Cook Islands; Capital: Avarua	A state in free association with New Zealand; it shares a head of state with New Zealand as well as having shared citizenship.
Dubai – State of Dubai (from 1 December 1971 to 2 December 1971); Capital: Dubai	Transitional independent state.
East Timor – Democratic Republic of East Timor (from 28 November 1975 to 7 December 1975) (Note: East Timor declared independence from Portugal on 28 November 1975. It was invaded and occupied by Indonesia on 7 December 1975, it also had a provisional government and annexed outright on 17 July 1976, though the legality of the declaration and annexation were not widely-recognized.); Capital: Dili	De facto independent state from 28 November 1975 to 7 December 1975; claimed by Portugal and Indonesia from 29 November 1975.
Fizi – Maquis of Fizi; Capital: Fizi	Unrecognized breakaway state in Zaire. Claimed by Zaire.
Fujairah – State of Fujairah (from 1 December 1971 to 2 December 1971); Capital: Fujairah	Transitional independent state.
Kampuchea, People's Republic of (from 10 January 1979) (Note: The People's Republic of Kampuchea was declared on 10 January 1979.); Capital: Phnom Penh	Partially recognized de facto independent state. Claimed to be the sole legitimate government of Kampuchea; the People's Republic of Kampuchea was occupied by Vietnam from December 1978.
Niue (from 19 October 1974); Capital: Alofi	A state in free association with New Zealand; Niue was a member of multiple UN agencies with full treaty making capacity and it had shared citizenship with New Zealand.
North Solomons – Republic of the North Solomons (from 1 September 1975 to 7 August 1976) (Note: The Republic of the North Solomons declared independence from the Australian-administered Trust Territory of Papua and New Guinea on 1 September 1975. The North Solomons gave up their claim of independence on 7 August 1976.); Capital: Kieta	De facto independent state. Claimed by Australia (to 16 September 1975) and Papua New Guinea (from 16 September 1975).
Ras al-Khaimah – State of Ras al-Khaimah (from 1 December 1971 to 11 February 1972) (Note: Ras al-Khaimah became fully independent when the British Protectorate over the Trucial States came to an end on 1 December 1971. On 11 February 1972 it joined the United Arab Emirates.); Capital: Ras al-Khaimah	Transitional independent state.
→ Rhodesia / Zimbabwe Rhodesia; Capital: Salisbury: Rhodesia (to 2 March 1970) (Note: Rhodesia became a republic on 2 March 1970.); Republic of Rhodesia (from 2 March 1970 to 1 June 1979) (Note: The interim state of Zimbabwe Rhodesia was established on 1 June 1979.); Republic of Zimbabwe Rhodesia (from 1 June 1979 to 12 December 1979) (Note: Zimbabwe Rhodesia reverted to the UK's rule on 12 December 1979.)	De facto independent state; not recognized by any other state. Claimed by the United Kingdom.|-
Rwenzururu – Kingdom of Rwenzururu; Capital: Kasese	De facto independent state; not recognized by any other state. Claimed by Uganda.
Sahrawi Arab Democratic Republic (from 27 February 1976) (Note: The date the Sahrawi Arab Democratic Republic declared its independence on.); Capital: Bir Lehlou (official), Rabouni (seat of government-in-exile), El Aaiún (claimed)	Partially recognized de facto independent state. The Sahrawi Arab Democratic Republic claimed the disputed territory of Western Sahara, most of which was under control of Morocco and (to 11 August 1979) Mauritania. The territory under its control, the so-called Free Zone, was claimed by Morocco and Mauritania. Its government resided in exile in Tindouf, Algeria.
Saint Christopher-Nevis-Anguilla; Capital: Basseterre	Associated state of the United Kingdom.
Sharjah – State of Sharjah (from 1 December 1971 to 2 December 1971); Capital: Sharjah	Transitional independent state.
Tanna – Tanna Nation (from 24 March 1974 to 29 June 1974) (Note: Tanna declared independence from the New Hebrides on 24 March 1974. The rebellion was put down on 29 June 1974.); Capital: Lénakel	De facto independent state; claimed by the Anglo-French New Hebrides Condominium.
Transkei – Republic of Transkei (from 26 October 1976) (Note: The South African bantustan of Transkei was declared independent on 26 October 1976.); Capital: Umtata	Nominally independent South African bantustan.
Umm al-Quwain – State of Umm al-Quwain (from 1 December 1971 to 2 December 1971); Capital: Umm al-Quwain	Transitional independent state.
Venda – Republic of Venda (from 13 September 1979) (Note: Venda gained nominal independence on 13 September 1979.); Capital: Thohoyandou	Nominally independent South African bantustan.

== Other entities ==
Excluded from the list above are the following noteworthy entities which either were not fully sovereign or did not claim to be independent:

- Antarctica as a whole had no government and no permanent population. Seven states claimed portions of Antarctica and five of these had reciprocally recognised one another's claims. These claims, which were regulated by the Antarctic Treaty System, were neither recognised nor disputed by any other signatory state.
- East Timor was occupied and administered by Indonesia as Timor Timur, but this was not recognized by the United Nations, which considered it to be Portuguese territory under Indonesian occupation.
- Estonia was occupied and administered by the Soviet Union, but the legality of the annexation was not widely-recognized. The Baltic diplomatic services in the West continued to be recognised as representing the de jure state.
- Latvia was occupied and administered by the Soviet Union, but the legality of the annexation was not widely-recognized. The Baltic diplomatic services in the West continued to be recognised as representing the de jure state.
- Lithuania was occupied and administered by the Soviet Union, but the legality of the annexation was not widely-recognized. The Baltic diplomatic services in the West continued to be recognised as representing the de jure state.
- The Saudi–Iraqi neutral zone was a strip of neutral territory between Iraq and Saudi Arabia.
- The Sovereign Military Order of Malta was an entity claiming sovereignty. The order had bi-lateral diplomatic relations with a large number of states, but had no territory other than extraterritorial areas within Rome. The order's Constitution stated: "The Order is a subject of international law and exercises sovereign functions." Although the order frequently asserted its sovereignty, it did not claim to be a sovereign state. It lacked a defined territory. Since all its members were citizens of other states, almost all of them lived in their native countries, and those who resided in the order's extraterritorial properties in Rome did so only in connection with their official duties, the order lacked the characteristic of having a permanent population.
- West Berlin was a political enclave that was closely aligned with, but not actually a part of, West Germany. It consisted of three occupied sectors administered by the United States, the United Kingdom, and France.

== See also ==
- List of sovereign states by year
- List of state leaders in 1970
- List of state leaders in 1971
- List of state leaders in 1972
- List of state leaders in 1973
- List of state leaders in 1974
- List of state leaders in 1975
- List of state leaders in 1976
- List of state leaders in 1977
- List of state leaders in 1978
- List of state leaders in 1979
