= Each endeavouring, all achieving =

National motto of Antigua and Barbuda

Coat of arms of Antigua and Barbuda with the phrase "Each endeavouring, all achieving"

Each endeavouring, all achieving is considered the traditional national motto of Antigua and Barbuda. The motto was written by James Carott, permanent secretary in the Ministry of Commerce, Production and Labour. Carott was awarded one-hundred dollars for his work. On 16 February 1967, the national coat of arms designed in 1966 by Gordon Christopher was officially adopted due to the impending establishment of the Associated State of Antigua. The intended purpose of the motto was to inspire Antiguans and Barbudans to work for the country's benefit. The motto has since been referenced in various other national symbols of Antigua and Barbuda, such as the second verse of the national anthem.

== Other usage ==
The motto is also used by the Barbuda Council, which uses a seal identical to the national coat of arms. Most national security-related agencies other than some military units also reference the national motto in official publications. It is also customary for Independence Day addresses from the Prime Minister to reference it.
