= National symbols of Antigua and Barbuda =

The national symbols of Antigua and Barbuda are the ten official symbols used to represent the country.

== Current national symbols ==
Symbol	Image	References
Flag		
Coat of arms		
National dress	Plaid dress designed by Heather Doram	
National flower	Dagger log flower (Agave karatto)	
National animal	European fallow deer	
National fruit	Antigua black pineapple	
National tree	Antigua whitewood	
National bird	Frigatebird	
National sea creature	Hawksbill turtle	
National stone	Antiguan petrified wood	
