= Walter P. Chambers =

Antiguan composer (1908–2003)

"Antigua Land"
"Antigua Land", composed by Chambers. Lyrics by Edna Bridgewater.

Walter Garnet Picart Chambers (1908 – 2003) was an Antiguan musician who composed the national anthem, "Fair Antigua, We Salute Thee", and various other patriotic songs. When he was nine years old, he became the organist for the All Saints Anglican Church. Chambers was active throughout much of the 1960s and worked as both a church pipe organist and a piano tuner. Chambers worked with Novelle Richards who composed the lyrics to many of his famous songs. Other than the national anthem, his best known composition is "Antigua Land".

== Works ==
- "Fair Antigua, We Salute Thee"
- "God Bless our State"
- "Oh God of Life and Light"
- "Dear God in Heaven"
- "Unto Us a Nation's Born"
- "Antigua Land"
