= History of Antigua and Barbuda (1962–1967) =

British colony in Antigua and Barbuda

Colony of Antigua
- 1962–1967
- Flag Coat of arms

- Status: Crown colony of the United Kingdom
- Capital and largest city: St. John's; 17°7′N 61°51′W
- Demonym: Antiguan

Government
  - Monarch: Elizabeth II
  - Administrator: Ian Turbott (1962–1964); David Rose (1964–1966)
  - Chief minister: Vere Bird (1960–1967)
- Legislature: Legislative Council

Self-governing crown colony
- History
  - Established: 1962
  - Disestablished: 1967

Area
  - Total: 440 km^{2} (170 sq mi)

Population
  - 1966 estimate: ~61,000
- Currency: BWI dollar (XBWD) (1962–1965); Eastern Caribbean dollar (XCD) (1965–1967)
- Time zone: UTC-4 (AST)
- Calling code: +1-268
- ISO 3166 code: AG
Preceded by	Succeeded by
West Indies Federation; (Territory of Antigua)	Associated State of Antigua

This article covers the history of Antigua and Barbuda from 1962 until 1967. This period began after the fall of the West Indies Federation, and concluded with the establishment of the Associated State of Antigua.

== 1962–1964: Post-federation ==
The post-federation period began with the Administrator of Antigua visiting Montserrat from 9 June 1962 until 12 June. During this time, the attorney-general served as the deputy administrator. By June, the Antigua Broadcasting Service's radio station had been formed, being responsible for disseminating emergency information. On 17 July, a supplementary appropriation ordinance went into force, and on 30 July, the financial secretary died. On 16 August 1962, D. J. G. Rose became the colony's acting administrator, originally being scheduled to hold that role until 17 February 1963.

On 22 February 1963, the yearly appropriation ordinance went into effect. There was a military expenditure of just 7,500 dollars, and a total expenditure of 11.5 million dollars. 58,000 dollars went to Barbuda. During February, there was a small controversy involving Hugh Barrows' appointment as magistrate for districts "A" and "B", resulting in an ordinance being passed to confirm his appointment. On 28 February, an investigation into a Leeward Islands Air Transport Services accident at Coolidge Airport was announced by the Ministry of Public Works and Communications. On 28 March, there were 4.7 million dollars' worth of notes and 175,000 dollars' worth of coins circulating in the colony. On 8 June at 8:45 am, a ceremonial parade for the Queen's Birthday was held at the Antigua Recreation Ground. On 16 December, Antigua's gaming regulations were gazetted. On 21 December, the Legislative Council was prorogued. On 30 December, the Supreme Court Act was amended.

== 1965–1967: Prelude to association ==
On 29 November 1965, a general election was held. The election continued on 15 December due to the withdrawal of three candidates. The Antigua Labour Party won the election before a vote was cast, due to six of their candidates (a majority) running unopposed. However, the election showed the first signs of Vere Bird's declining hegemony. Back in 1962, Robert Hall unified various opposition movements into the Antigua and Barbuda Democratic Movement. While Labour won all the seats, voter turnout was low and this was the final time the Antiguan legislature had only one political grouping. The Antigua and Barbuda Democratic Movement also won the highest proportion of the vote so far of any opposition party.

After the election, Antigua began its path to associated statehood. From 28 February 1966 until 25 March 1966, the Antigua Constitutional Conference was held, resulting in the signing of a consensus report known as Cmnd. 2963. The association was to be voluntary, and Antigua was to gain full internal autonomy. On 27 February 1967, Antigua became the first of the West Indies Associated States, with Barbuda and Redonda as dependencies.
