= East Caribbean Common Market =

The East Caribbean Common Market (ECCM) was established by Dominica, Grenada, Montserrat, and St. Lucia in 1968. It was joined by St. Vincent (1979), St. Kitts and Nevis (1980) and Antigua and Barbuda (1981). It overlapped with the West Indies Associated States.

The ECCM was replaced by the Organisation of Eastern Caribbean States (OECS).
