= Associated State of Antigua =

Historical state linked to the United Kingdom

- 1967–1981
- Flag Coat of arms
- Motto: "Each endeavouring, all achieving"
- Anthem: "Fair Antigua, We Salute Thee" Royal anthem: "God Save the Queen"
- Status: Associated state of the United Kingdom
- Capital and largest city: St. John's; 17°7′N 61°51′W
- Official languages: English
- Demonym: Antiguan

Government
  - Monarch: Charles III
  - Governor: Wilfred Jacobs
  - Premier: Vere Bird (1967–1971); George Walter (1971–1976); Vere Bird (1971–1981)
  - Deputy Premier: Robert Hall (1971–1976)
- Legislature: Parliament
  - Upper house: Senate
  - Lower house: House of Representatives

Associated statehood
- History
  - Established: 1967
  - Disestablished: 1981

Area
  - Total: 440 km^{2} (170 sq mi)

Population
  - 1981 estimate: ~70,000
- Currency: Eastern Caribbean dollar (XCD)
- Time zone: UTC-4 (AST)
- Calling code: +1-268
- ISO 3166 code: AG
Preceded by	Succeeded by
Colony of Antigua	Antigua and Barbuda

Antigua, officially the Associated State of Antigua, was an associated state of the United Kingdom, which was established on 27 February 1967. The associated state was abolished on November 1, 1981, by the Antigua (Termination of Association) Order.

== History ==
The Antigua Constitutional Conference unfolded from February 28 to March 25, 1966, culminating in the signing of a consensus report. The report was subsequently presented to the British Parliament. The Conference outlined key decisions, including the establishment of a new, voluntary association between Britain and Antigua, characterized by mutual freedom and the ability for either party to terminate the association at will. Antigua was to exercise full autonomy over internal affairs, while defense and foreign affairs remained under British jurisdiction. Both governments committed to negotiating a comprehensive plan detailing how Britain would fulfill its responsibilities in defense and foreign affairs, with considerable communication and delegation to the Antigua government in the realm of external affairs. The consensus also encompassed agreed-upon elements for the formulation of a new Antiguan constitution, with the specifics of this agreement detailed in Cmnd. 2963.

Following the 1951 general elections, the Antigua Trades and Labour Union and the Antigua Labour Party (ALP) continued to nominate additional candidates, securing an increasing number of seats in the Antiguan Parliament. In 1961, Vere Bird assumed the role of chief minister in the newly established position. After five years, he spearheaded a delegation to London to deliberate on the matter of Antiguan independence. Subsequent to a constitutional conference, Antigua achieved the status of an associated state in February 1967, with Barbuda and the minuscule island of Redonda as dependencies. While Antigua attained internal independence, its foreign affairs and defense remained under British control.

During the 1971 Antiguan general election, Antigua marked its first change of government. This resulted in the Progressive Labour Movement (PLM) winning 57.72% of the popular vote and thirteen out of the seventeen constituencies. The administration was marred by repressive social measures, including limitations on freedom of the press and economic policies that resulted in a recession. Several leaders of the PLM party, including George Walter, faced corruption charges related to their alleged mismanagement during their tenure in office. While Walter was released upon appeal, he found himself disqualified from participating in the 1980 elections. Robert Hall assumed the role of PLM party leader in his stead. Undeterred, Walter sought a return to political influence by establishing the United People's Movement (UPM), enlisting the support of some of his followers from the PLM.

Between 1976 and 1980, the ALP enacted policies that revitalized the economy and were considered to foster a reopening of society. These initiatives proved successful, allowing the ALP to solidify its dominance, at the expense of both the PLM and UPM. The 1980 election saw an easy victory for the ALP, with a campaign centered on the promise of enhanced economic and social conditions, as well as independence.

As per section 10(2) of the West Indies Act 1967, the Antigua Termination of Association Order 1981 officially ended the associated status between the United Kingdom and Antigua. When Richard Luce presented the order before the UK Parliament, discussions revolved around concerns such as the potential for a rebellion in Barbuda, akin to the Republic of Anguilla's historical incident, and objections to Barbudans becoming part of the emerging state. Independence was scheduled for 1 November 1981.

Upon Princess Margaret's arrival in Antigua on October 30, 1981, she received a warm welcome from an honor guard composed of police and soldiers. The following day, October 31, 1981, amidst a tropical downpour, Antigua and Barbuda inaugurated its parliament building, just hours before achieving independence. In the harbor, five warships—three British, one Venezuelan, one American—stood ready for the midnight salute to mark the momentous occasion. At the stroke of midnight on November 1, 1981, witnessed by 25,000 spectators, the Antiguan and Barbudan flag ascended while the Union Jack descended at the Antigua Recreation Ground, symbolizing the newfound independence of the country.

== Governance ==
=== Executive branch ===
The monarch held executive control over Antigua. The governor and his subordinate officers exercised Antigua's administrative authority in accordance with the provisions of the Constitution. The Antiguan Cabinet was answerable to Parliament and oversaw the Antiguan administration. The Premier and his ministers made up the Cabinet. In addition, the attorney general served in the Cabinet.

The Governor appointed the Premier. The member of the House of Representatives with the greatest level of support and willingness to serve as an appointment was to be named Premier. Apart from the Premier, there were additional ministers appointed by the Governor. It was required for one of the ministers to be a senator. If a resolution of no confidence passed the House of Representatives and the Premier did not step down within three days or recommend that parliament be dissolved, the governor had the authority to remove the Premier from office. The premier had the ability to charge any minister with the administration of any government department or any business in the government of Antigua.

=== Legislative branch ===
The Parliament of Antigua was constructed very similarly to the present-day Parliament of Antigua and Barbuda. Subject to the provisions of the Constitution, Parliament was responsible for making laws for the peace, order and good government of Antigua. No member of either House of Parliament could take part in the proceedings of that House (other than for necessary purposes) until he made and subscribed the oath of allegiance.

A bill other than a money bill could be introduced in either House of Parliament. Money bills could not be introduced in the Senate, identical to the provision in the present-day Constitution of Antigua and Barbuda.
