= Antigua black pineapple =

National fruit of Antigua and Barbuda

The Antigua black pineapple is a variety of pineapple that is grown on the island of Antigua, in the West Indies. It is known for its sweet and juicy flesh, which is said to have a unique flavor compared to other varieties of pineapple. It is a popular local fruit and is used in a variety of traditional dishes and desserts on the island.

It is exclusively grown on the southwestern coast of Antigua. It is said to be the sweetest variety of pineapple.
