= Coat of arms of Antigua and Barbuda =

National coat of arms

- Armiger: Antigua and Barbuda
- Adopted: 16 February 1967
- Crest: On a helmet to the dexter, lambrequined Azure and Argent, a pineapple and four hibiscusflowers proper.
- Torse: Argent and Azure
- Shield: Barry wavy of six Argent and Azure, a sugar mill on a grassy ground, proper; and a chief wavy Sable, a rising sun radiant Or
- Supporters: Two deer, the dexter supporting a sugarcane and the sinister supporting an aloe, all proper
- Compartment: A grassy ground surrounded by waves of the sea Argent and Azure.
- Motto: Each Endeavouring, All Achieving
- Earlier version
- Use: 1909–1967

The coat of arms of Antigua and Barbuda was designed in 1966 by Gordon Christopher. It was officially introduced on 16 February 1967. The symbolism of the arms is more complex than that found on the flag of Antigua and Barbuda, but many elements are similar.

At the top of the coat of arms is a pineapple, a fruit for which the islands are famous. There are several plants found around the shield, all abundant in the country: red hibiscus, sugarcane, and century plant (Agave americana). Supporting the shield is a pair of deer representing the wildlife of the islands.

The design on the shield shows the sun, also found on the flag, rising from a blue and white sea. The sun symbolises a new beginning, and the black background represents the African origins of many of the nation's citizens. At the bottom of the shield, in front of the sea, sits a stylised sugar mill. The sun on the shield represents the six parishes of Antigua, and, the island of Barbuda.

At the bottom is a scroll upon which is written the national motto: "Each endeavouring, all achieving".

== Gallery ==
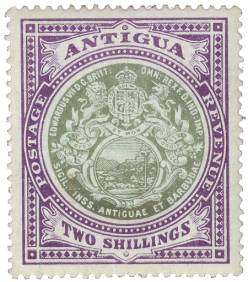
Coat of arms of Antigua on a postage stamp from 1903

Coat of arms of the British Leeward Islands (1909–1940), with the top-left shield representing Antigua

Coat of arms of the British Leeward Islands (1940–1956), with the Antiguan shield moved to top-centre due to the removal of the Dominican shield
