= West Indies Associated States =

1967–1983 group of British-associated Caribbean island states

West Indies Act 1967 (Note: Section 21.)
- Act of Parliament
- Parliament of the United Kingdom
- Long title: An Act to confer on certain West Indian territories a new status of association with the United Kingdom, and to enable that status to be terminated at any time; to make provision for other matters in connection with, or consequential upon, the creation or termination of that status or other constitutional changes which may occur in relation to any of those territories; to make further provision as to grants under the Overseas Aid Act 1966; and for purposes connected with the matters aforesaid.
- Citation: 1967 c. 4
- Territorial extent: United Kingdom

Dates
- Royal assent: 16 February 1967
- Commencement: 16 February 1967 (Note: The Acts of Parliament (Commencement) Act 1793.)
Other legislation
| Amends | Overseas Aid Act 1966 |
| Amended by | Immigration Act 1971; Interpretation Act 1978; Anguilla Consequential Provisions Order 1983; Statute Law (Repeals) Act 1986 |
| Relates to | West Indies Act 1967 (Appointed Days) Order 1967 |

Status: Partially repealed

Text of statute as originally enacted

Revised text of statute as amended

Text of the West Indies Associated States as in force today (including any amendments) within the United Kingdom, from legislation.gov.uk.

West Indies Associated States was the collective name for a number of islands in the Eastern Caribbean whose status changed from being British colonies to states in free association with the United Kingdom in 1967. The move was partly to satisfy the U.N. Special Committee on Decolonization regarding the United Nations list of non-self-governing territories. The states involved were Antigua, Dominica, Grenada, Saint Christopher-Nevis-Anguilla, Saint Lucia, and Saint Vincent.

Associated statehood between these six territories and the UK was brought about by the West Indies Act 1967 (c. 4). Under the act each state had full control over its constitution (and thus internal self-government), while the UK retained responsibility for external affairs and defence. The British monarch remained head of state, but each state's Governor now had only ceremonial powers (representing the monarch locally), and was often a local citizen. Many moved to change their flags from modified versions of the Blue Ensign to unique designs, with three – St. Vincent, St. Kitts-Nevis-Anguilla, and Grenada – adopting blue, green and yellow flags.

During the period of free association, all of the states participated in the West Indies Associated States Council of Ministers, the East Caribbean Common Market and Caribbean Free Trade Association (CARIFTA) (now superseded by the Caribbean Community). Cooperation between the eastern Caribbean states continued after the West Indies Associated States achieved separate independence, in the form of the Organisation of Eastern Caribbean States (the successor organisation).

Summary of West Indies Associated States
| Associated state | Commencement of association | Termination of association |
|---|---|---|
| Antigua | 27 February 1967 | 1 November 1981 |
| Dominica | 1 March 1967 | 3 November 1978 |
| Grenada | 3 March 1967 | 7 February 1974 |
| Saint Christopher-Nevis-Anguilla | 27 February 1967 | 19 September 1983* |
| Saint Lucia | 1 March 1967 | 22 February 1979 |
| Saint Vincent and the Grenadines | 27 October 1969 | 27 October 1979 |

*Anguilla left the Union of St Kitts-Nevis-Anguilla officially on 29 October 1980 and remained a British territory, leaving St Kitts and Nevis to achieve independence within the Commonwealth.

Over time, the associated states moved to full independence, the first being Grenada in 1974. This was followed by Dominica in 1978, Saint Lucia and Saint Vincent both in 1979, Antigua and Barbuda in 1981 and Saint Kitts and Nevis in 1983.

The moves towards independence were not always smooth, with separatist movements/campaigns occurring in Barbuda, Nevis and Anguilla. In Anguilla, this resulted in the secession of Anguilla from Saint Kitts-Nevis-Anguilla in 1969 and its reversion to British rule as a separate colony. During the 1970s, Nevis' local council wished to follow Anguilla's example, rather than become independent with Saint Kitts; however, the UK was opposed to Nevis becoming a separate colony and eventually the federation of Saint Kitts and Nevis became independent in 1983. In Barbuda, there was a campaign for separate independence from Antigua, but this was unsuccessful. All former associated states went on to keep the British monarchy and became Commonwealth realms, with the exception of Dominica from 1978. All former associated states also kept the Judicial Committee of the Privy Council as the highest court of appeal, with the exception of Dominica and Saint Lucia, which adopted the Caribbean Court of Justice as the final court of appeal in 2015 and 2023 respectively.

Of all of these islands that were once associated states, all are now independent, except for Anguilla within the former St. Kitts-Nevis-Anguilla, which is still a British Overseas Territory.

== See also ==
- British West Indies
- Compagnie des Îles de l'Amérique
- Eastern Caribbean Supreme Court
- West Indies Federation (1958–1962)
- Special territories of members of the European Economic Area#Former special territories
