= Youth in Barbuda =

Demographics

In terms of the demography of the island, youth in Barbuda can be categorized together as one age group. It was projected that 33.92% of the Barbudan population was aged 0–17 years in 2011. (285 young men and 266 young women).

In this article, youth is defined as those aged 0–17 years old.

The Barbuda Council Youth Affairs & Sports committee has responsibility for youth.

== Ethnicity, citizenship, and immigration ==
In Barbuda, 95.56% of the youth are of African descent, 2.96% are mixed Black and White, and 1.48% are of other mixed ancestry. A total of 0.18% of young people were born in "Other Latin or North American countries," 92.42% in Antigua and Barbuda, 0.92% in Canada, 0.55% in Dominica, 1.85% in Guyana, 0.37% in Jamaica, 0.37% in the UK, 2.22% in the US, 0.92% in the US Virgin Islands, and 0.18% were unsure of their birthplace. 93.90% of respondents identified their primary citizenship as Antiguan and Barbudan, 0.55% as Canadian, 0.55% as Dominican (Commonwealth) citizen, 1.66% as Guyanese, 0.37% as Jamaican, 0.18% as British, 2.40% as American, 0.18% as having another citizenship, and 0.18% as not stating. Out of the children who held dual citizenship, 18.18% were citizens of Canada, 9.09% were citizens of the Commonwealth of Dominica, 9.09% were Guyanese, 9.09% were British, 45.45% were citizens of the United States, and 9.09% were citizens of another nation.

== Housing ==
4.07% of youth lived in households that used concrete as the main material of outer walls, 74.12% of lived in homes that used concrete/blocks, 10.35% lived in homes that used wood, 8.87% lived in homes that used wood and concrete, and 2.59% used other. 0.92% of young people lived in households that used concrete as the main roofing material, 97.23% in sheet metal, 0.74% in asphalt shingles, 0.74% in other shingles, and 0.37% in wood shingles. 98.52% of youth live in separate homes, 0.18% live in part of a private home, and 1.29% in a business/dwelling. 2.24% of youth lived in households that reported a crime in the last 12 months.

== Education ==
65.85% of young men aged 0–4 attended school full time, and 34.15% did not attend school, 97.56% of young men aged 5–9 attended school full time, 1.22% attended school part-time, and 1.22% did not attend school, 100.00% of young men aged 10–14 attended school full time, 76.67% of young men aged 15–19 attended school full time, and 23.33% did not. 65.43% of young women aged 0–4 attended school full time, by far the highest number in the nation, 34.57% of young women aged 0–4 did not attend school full time, 98.72% of young women aged 5–9 attended school full time, and 1.28% did not, 100.00% of young women aged 10–14 attended school full time, 77.42% of young women aged 15–19 attended school full time, and 22.58% did not.

== Health ==
4.81% of youth had a disability with some difficulty, and 2.03% of youth had a disability with lots of difficulty. In both categories, these rates were higher compared to any other parish on Antigua. 8.55% of youth had allergies in Barbuda, the third highest number in the nation. 0.19% of youth had diabetes. 0.37% of youth had sickle cell, by far the lowest number in the nation. 0.19% of youth have mental illness, the highest number in the nation. 2.96% of youth have a seeing disability with some difficulty, and 0.18% of youth have a seeing disability with a lot of difficulty or not able to see at all.
