= Committees of the Barbuda Council =

Part of the internal affairs of Barbuda

The Barbuda Council has committees that may be created by the by-laws of the council or under the Barbuda Local Government Act that are responsible for departmentalising the functions of the council and delegating the tasks of the council.

== Creation ==
The Barbuda Council may make bylaws governing meeting times and procedures, member attendance, and the format and sequence of discussions, as well as the selection of committees, committee constitutions, their composition, regulation of committee proceedings, and its committees' conduct of business.

== Roles and legislation ==
The Barbuda Council secretary undertakes the required preparations for the council's and its committees' meetings. The secretary of the Council must also attend all meetings of the committees. The secretary of the council or the chairperson of the committees may call meetings of the committees whenever they feel it necessary. A majority of the members present and voting at a meeting shall decide on each subject before the committee. The chairperson of a Committee, as the case may be, has an initial vote and, in the event of a tie, a second or casting vote. This applies to any item that must be decided by a vote at a meeting of the council or a committee thereof. Any committee member who is present at a meeting of the committee where the matter is to be considered has any pecuniary interest, direct or indirect, by himself or his partner in any contract, proposed contract, or other matter, must disclose his interest at the meeting, refrain from participating in any discussion or consideration of the matter, and withdraw from the meeting during such discussion.

The Barbuda Council is required to establish a finance committee, a works and general purposes committee, and a health and social welfare committee at its first meeting of the year. A council member is eligible to serve on multiple committees. The council is free to create any other committees it sees proper for either general or special reasons.

=== Delegated tasks ===
The Barbuda Council may assign any duties that fall under its purview—other than the authority to create bylaws, raise money, approve yearly budgets, or borrow money—to a committee that it has appointed. It may do so with or without restrictions.

== List ==
=== 2025 appointments ===
On 7 April 2025, the committees were appointed as follows:

Committee	Chair
Finance	Trevor Walker
Health	Wayde Burton
Works	Devon Warner
Agriculture and Lands	Jacklyn Frank
Fisheries and Coastal Protection	Nico Antonio
Tourism and Culture	Nadia George
Utilities	Melanie Beazer
Sports and Youth Affairs	Fitzroy Warner
Education	Sharima Myers

=== 2024 appointments ===
With the election of the new chairperson on January 16, 2024, the composition of the Barbuda Council committees stayed the same. The chair of the committee on health, social welfare, and disaster relief is Wayde Burton, sports and youth affairs, agriculture, lands, fisheries, and coastal protection is John Mussington, and finance is chaired by Barbuda MP Trevor Walker.

In addition, Fitzroy Warner chairs the Utilities Committee, Nadia George chairs the Tourism and Culture Committee, Melanie Beazer chairs the Education Committee, and Nico Antonio chairs the Works Committee.

=== 2021 appointments ===
Committee	Chair	Deputy Chair
Finance	Trevor Walker	Fabian Jones
Agriculture, Lands, Fisheries, and Costal Protection	Devon Warner (later Fabian Jones)	Trevor Walker
Tourism and Culture	Sharima Myers	Melanie Beazer
Sports and Youth Affairs	Nadia George	Devon Warner
Works and General Purposes	Nico Antonio	Wade Burton
Education and Training	Melanie Beazer	Jackie Frank
Health, Welfare, and Social Welfare	Mackenzie Frank	Wade Burton
Utilities	Wade Burton	Mackenzie Frank

=== 2020 appointments ===
Committee	Chair	Deputy Chair
Finance, Education & Training	Trevor Walker	Fabian Jones
Health	Nadia George	Kendra Beazer
Works	Wayde Burton	Devon Warner
Agriculture, Lands, Fisheries & Coastal Protection	Devon Warner	Kendra Beazer
Tourism & Culture	Jacklyn Frank	Sharima Myers
Utilities & Energy	Kendra Beazer	Wayde Burton
Sports & Youth Affairs	Sharima Myers	Devon Warner

=== 2018 appointments ===
Committee	Chair
Health, Social Welfare and Disaster	Nadia George
Finance, Education and Training	Trevor Walker
Tourism, Culture, Sport and Youth Affairs	Asha Frank
Works and General Purposes	Calsey Beazer
Agriculture, Forestry, Marine Resources and Coastal Protection	Kendra Beazer

=== April 2017 appointments attempt ===
An attempt was made to create six committees, with the Barbuda People's Movement and the Labour Party each chairing three, however, this did not succeed.
