= 13th legislature of Antigua and Barbuda =

Parliament of Antigua and Barbuda (2009–2014)

←	12th	14th	→
- Coat of arms of Antigua and Barbuda

Overview
- Legislative body: Parliament of Antigua and Barbuda
- Meeting place: St. John's
- Term: 12 March 2009 – 26 April 2014
- Election: 2009 Antiguan general election
- Government: UPP, BPM
- Opposition: ABLP

Crown of Antigua and Barbuda
- Monarch: Elizabeth II
- Governor-General: Louise Lake-Tack

Senate

House of Representatives

The 13th legislature of Antigua and Barbuda was elected on 12 March 2009. It was dissolved on 26 April 2014.

As of April 8, 2022, it is the most recent parliament that has had a UPP majority.

== Members ==
=== Senate ===
Party	Representative
UPP	Hazelyn Francis
UPP	Edmond Mansoor
UPP	Errol Cort
UPP	Malaka Parker
UPP	Joanne Massiah
UPP	Colin Derrick
UPP	Elmore Charles
UPP	Winston Williams
UPP	Anthony Stuart
UPP	David Massiah
ALP	Gail Christian Minority Leader (to July 2013) (resigned 9 August 2013)
ALP	Arthur Nibbs Minority Leader (from July 2013)
ALP	Paul Chet Greene
ALP	Lennox Weston
IND	Sylvia O'Mard
BPM	Mackenzie Frank
BPM	Randolph Beazer

==== Changes to Senate during session ====
Changes to Senate during session	
Mervyn Richards (from March 2013)	UPP
Richard Lewis (from March 2013)	UPP
Samantha Marshall (replaced Gail Christian from August 2013)	ALP
Randolph Beazer (resigned March 2013)	BPM

=== House of Representatives ===
Party	Representative	Constituency
UPP	Baldwin Spencer Prime Minister	St. John's Rural West
ALP	Gaston Browne Leader of the Opposition	St. John's City West
UPP	Harold Lovell	St. John's City East
UPP	John Maginley	St. John's Rural North
UPP	Hilson Baptiste	St. Mary's South
UPP	Chester Hughes	All Saints East & St. Luke
UPP	Chanlah Codrington	All Saints West
UPP	Jacqui Quinn-Leandro	St. George
UPP	Willmoth Daniel	St. Phillip South
UPP	Eleston Adams	St. Paul
BPM	Trevor Walker	Barbuda
UPP	Justin Simon	Attorney-General
ALP	Steadroy Benjamin	St. John's City South
ALP	Eustace Lake	St. John's Rural South
ALP	Lester Bird	St. John's Rural East
ALP	Molwyn Joseph	St. Mary's North
ALP	Asot Michael	St. Peter
ALP	Robin Yearwood	St. Phillip North
