= 11th legislature of Antigua and Barbuda =

Parliament of Antigua and Barbuda (1999–2004)

←	10th	12th	→
- Coat of arms of Antigua and Barbuda

Overview
- Legislative body: Parliament of Antigua and Barbuda
- Meeting place: St. John's
- Term: 9 March 1999 – 26 February 2004
- Election: 1999 Antiguan general election
- Government: ABLP
- Opposition: UPP, BPM

Crown of Antigua and Barbuda

Senate

House of Representatives

The 11th legislature of Antigua and Barbuda was elected on 9 March 1999, and was dissolved on 26 February 2004.

== Members ==
=== Senate ===
Party	Representative
ALP	Millicent Percival
ALP	George Bernard Walker
ALP	Guy Yearwood
ALP	Asot Micheal
ALP	Kenrick Isaac
ALP	Reuben James
ALP	Llewellyn Smith
ALP	Samuel Aymer
ALP	Nathalie Payne
ALP	Charles Fernandez
ALP	Rupert Sterling
UPP	Leonard T. Hector
UPP	Lionel Gomes
UPP	Bertrand Joseph
UPP	Ralph Potter
UPP	Aziz Hadeed
	Calvin Gore
ALP	Osmund Lake

=== House of Representatives ===
Party	Representative	Constituency
ALP	Lester Bird Prime Minister	St. John's Rural East
UPP	Baldwin Spencer Leader of the Opposition	St. John's Rural West
ALP	Gaston Browne	St. John's City West
ALP	John St. Luce	St. John's City East
ALP	Steadroy Benjamin	St. John's City South
ALP	Vere Bird Jr.	St. John's Rural South
ALP	Bernard Percival	St. John's Rural North
ALP	Molwyn Joseph	St. Mary's North
UPP	Hilson Baptiste	St. Mary's South
UPP	Charlesworth Samuel	All Saints East & St. Luke
ALP	Hilroy Humphreys	All Saints West
UPP	Nathaniel Francis	St. George
ALP	Longford Jeremy	St. Peter
ALP	Robin Yearwood	St. Phillip North
ALP	Sherfield Bowen	St. Phillip South
ALP	Rodney Williams	St. Paul
BPM	Thomas Hilbourne Frank	Barbuda
ALP	Gertel Thom	Attorney General
