= 12th legislature of Antigua and Barbuda =

Parliament of Antigua and Barbuda

←	11th	13th	→
- Coat of arms of Antigua and Barbuda

Overview
- Legislative body: Parliament of Antigua and Barbuda
- Meeting place: St. John's
- Term: 23 March 2004 – 9 February 2009
- Election: 2004 Antiguan general election
- Government: UPP, BPM
- Opposition: ABLP

Crown of Antigua and Barbuda

Senate

House of Representatives

The 12th legislature of Antigua and Barbuda was formed on 23 March 2004, and was dissolved on 9 February 2009.

It was the first parliament with a UPP majority.

== Members ==
=== Senate ===
Party	Representative
UPP	Hazelyn Francis
UPP	Edmond Mansoor
UPP	Aziz Hadeed
UPP	Joanne Massiah
UPP	Colin Derrick
ALP	Elmore Charles

=== House of Representatives ===
Party	Representative	Constituency
UPP	Baldwin Spencer Prime Minister	St. John's Rural West
ALP	Gaston Browne	St. John's City West
UPP	Harold Lovell	St. John's City East
ALP	Steadroy Benjamin	St. John's City South
UPP	Winston Williams	St. John's Rural South
UPP	Errol Cort	St. John's Rural East
UPP	John Maginley	St. John's Rural North
UPP	Bertrand Joseph	St. Mary's North
UPP	Hilson Baptiste	St. Mary's South
UPP	Charlesworth Samuel†	All Saints East & St. Luke
UPP	Chanlah Codrington	All Saints West
UPP	Jacqui Quinn-Leandro	St. George
ALP	Asot Michael	St. Peter
ALP	Robin Yearwood	St. Phillip North
UPP	Willmoth Daniel	St. Phillip South
UPP	Eleston Adams	St. Paul
BPM	Trevor Walker	Barbuda
UPP	Justin Simon	Attorney General

† = died in office
