= 9th legislature of Antigua and Barbuda =

Parliament of Antigua and Barbuda (1989–1994)

The 9th legislature of Antigua and Barbuda was elected on Thursday, 9 March 1989 and was dissolved on Friday, 18 February 1994.

The first session was held on Monday, 20 March 1989.

It was the last parliament that Vere Bird served as prime minister.

== Acts of Parliament ==
=== 1993 ===
Name
Banking (Amendment) Act 1993
Beach Protection Amendment Act 1993
Civil Aviation (Amendment) Act 1993
Consumption Tax Act 1993
Customs (Control and Management) Act 1993
Customs Duties Act 1993
Eastern Caribbean States Export Development Agency Act 1993
Engineers (Registration) (Amendment) Act 1993
Extradition Act 1993
Internationally Protected Persons Act 1993
Magistrates Code of Procedure (Amendment) Act 1993
Marriage (Amendment) Act 1993
Misuse of Drugs (Amendment) Act 1993
Mutual Assistance in Criminal Matters Act 1993
Nuclear Material (Offences) Act 1993
Proceeds of Crime Act 1993
Protection of Animals (Amendment) Act 1993
Public Utilities (Amendment) Act 1993
Registration of United Kingdom Patents (Amendment) Act 1993
Roman Catholic Church Incorporating and Vesting (Amendment) Act 1993
Suppression of Terrorism Act 1993
Suppression of Torture Act 1993
Taking of Hostages Act 1993
The Appropriation (Development Fund) Act, 1993
The Appropriation Act, 1993

== Statutory Instruments ==
=== 1993 ===
Name	Year
Stamp (Antigua and Barbuda) (Anniversary and Events) Order, 1993 made by the Cabinet under sections 4 and 5 of the Stamp Act (Cap. 270).	1993
Animals (International Movement and Disease Regulations, 1993 made by the Minister under sections 10 and 19 of the Animals (International Movement and Disease) Act, 1986 (No. 34 of 1986)	1993
Animals (Prevention and Control of Amblyomma Variegatum and Associated Diseases) Regulations 1993 made by the Minister under section 12 of the Animals (Deases and Improtation) Act Cap 110	1993
Banking Business (CIBC Caribbean Limited) (Vesting) Order, made by the Minister under section 62(3) of the Banking Act, 1991 (No. 17 of 1991).	1993
Civil Aviation (Navigation Services Charges) (Amendment) Regulations, 1993 made by the Minister under section 3 of the Civil Aviation Act	1993
Civil Service (Amendment) Regulations, 1993 made by the Minister under section 28 of the Civil Service Act, 1984 (No. 24 of 1984)	1993
Commencement (Extradition Act 1993) Order 1993 made by the Minister of Legal Affairs under section 1 of the Extradition Act 1993 (No. 12 of 1993)	1993
Commencement (Proceeds of Crime Act, 1993) Order 1993 made by the Attorney General under section 73 of the Proceeds of Crime Act 1993	1993
External Trade (Import Restriction) (Amendment) Order, 1993 made by the Minister under section 3 of the External Trade Act (Cap. 361).	1993
Notice by the Minister under section 4 of the East Caribbean Central Bank Act, 1993 bringing that Act into force	1993
Notice by the Secretary to the Cabinet Pursuant to section 3 of the Probates (Resealing) Act (Cap. 64)	1993
Notice made by the Minister under section 2 of the Mutual Assistance in Criminal Matters Act 1993 (No. 2 of 1993) Bringing that Act into force	1993
Notice made by the Minister under section 9 of the Taking of Hostages Act 1993 (No. 4 of 1993) bringing that Act into force	1993
Proclamation dated the 22nd day of December, 1993 Declaring a Close Planting Season for Cotton.	1993
Proclamation dated the 22nd day of July, 1993 Appointing Tuesday the 3rd day of August, 1993 as a Public Holiday throughout Antigua and Barbuda.	1993
Rates Declaration Order, 1993 made by the Minister under section 5 of the Property Tax Act (No. 2 of 1986).	1993
Resolution Ratifying the Constitution of the Universal Postal Union, Done at Vienna, 10 July 1964; 2. the Universal Postal Convention, Done at Washington, 14 December 1989.	1993
Resolution Ratifying the Multilateral Convention on the Prohibition of the Development, Production & Stock piling of Bacteriological (Biological) & Toxin Weapons & on their Destruction	1993
Resolution Ratifying the United Nations Convention on the Rights of the Child, adopted by the General assembly of the United Nations Organizations on 5 December 1989 in New York	1993
Saint John's Development Corporation (Heritage Quay) Regulations, 1993, made by the Minister under section 26 of the Saint John's Development Corporation Act, 1986, (No. 1 of 1986	1993
Social Security (Benefits) (Age Pension and Grants) (Amendment) Regulations, 1993 made by the Minister under sections 29, 30 and 31 of the Social Security Act, 1972 (No. 3 of 1972).	1993
Social Security (Benefits) (Funeral Grants) (Amendment) Regulations, 1993 made by the Minister under sections 27, and 29 of the Social Security Act, 1972 (No. 3 of 1972).	1993
Social Security (Benefits) (Invalidity Pensions and Grants) (Amendment) Regulations, 1993 made by the Minister under sections 29, 30 and 31 of the Social Security Act, 1972 (No. 3 of 1972).	1993
Social Security (Benefits) (Old Age Assistance) (Amendment) Regulations, 1993 made by the Minister under sections 54 and 55 of the Social Security Act, 1972 (No. 3 of 1972)	1993
Social Security (Benefits) (Old Age Assistance) Regulations, 1993 made by the Minister under section 54 and 55 of the Social Security Act, 1972 (No. 3 of 1972).	1993
Social Security (Collection of Contributions) (Amendment) Regulations, 1993 made by the Minister under sections 19, 21,26 and 47 of the Social Security Act, 1972 (No. 3 of 1972).	1993
Stamp (Antigua and Barbuda Transportation) Order, 1993 made by the Cabinet under sections 4 and 5 of the Stamp Act (Cap. 270).	1993
Stamp (Antigua and Barbuda) (Bocentennial of the Louvre) Order, 1993 made by the Cabinet under sections 4 and 5 of the Stamp Act (Cap. 270)	1993
Stamp (Antigua and Barbuda) (Disney Mickey's 65th Anniversary) Order, 1993 made by the Cabinet under sections 4 and 5 of the Stamp Act (Cap. 270).	1993
Stamp (Antigua and Barbuda) (Endangered Species) Order, 1993 made by the Cabinet under sections 4 and 5 of the Stamp Act (Cap. 270)	1993
Stamp (Antigua and Barbuda) (Euro-Disney) Order, 1993 made by the Cabinet under sections 4 and 5 of the Stamp Act (Cap. 270)	1993
Stamp (Antigua and Barbuda) (Famous Philatelists) Order, 1993 made by the Cabinet under Sections 4 and 5 of the Stamp Act (Cap. 270).	1993
Stamp (Antigua and Barbuda) (Flowers) Order, 1993 made by the Cabinet under sections 4 and 5 of the Stamp Act (Cap. 27)	1993
Stamp (Antigua and Barbuda) (Pre-Football-World Cup 1994) Order, 1993 made by the Cabinet under sections 4 and 5 of the Stamp Act (Cap. 270).	1993
Stamp (Barbuda) (World bird Watch 9, 10 October 1993) Order, 1993 made by the Cabinet under sections 4 and 5 of the Stamp Act (Cap. 270).	1993

== Members ==
=== Senate ===
Unknown

=== House of Representatives ===
Speaker: Casford Murray

Party	Representative	Constituency
ALP	Henderson Simon	St. John's City West
ALP	John St. Luce	St. John's City East
ALP	Christopher O'Mard	St. John's City South
UNDP	Baldwin Spencer	St. John's Rural West
ALP	Vere Bird Jr.	St. John's Rural South
ALP	Lester Bird	St. John's Rural East
ALP	Vere Bird Sr. Prime Minister	St. John's Rural North
ALP	Molwyn Joseph	St. Mary's North
ALP	Hugh Marshall	St. Mary's South
ALP	Eustace Cochrane	All Saints East & St. Luke
ALP	Hilroy Humphreys	All Saints West
ALP	Adolphus Freeland	St. George
ALP	Joseph Myers	St. Peter
ALP	Robin Yearwood	St. Phillip North
ALP	Reuben Henry Harris	St. Phillip South
ALP	Rodney Williams	St. Paul
BPM	Thomas Hilbourne Frank	Barbuda
