= 14th legislature of Antigua and Barbuda =

2014 parliamentary body

←	13th	15th	→
- Coat of arms of Antigua and Barbuda

Overview
- Legislative body: Parliament of Antigua and Barbuda
- Meeting place: St. John's
- Term: 12 June 2014 – 26 February 2018
- Election: 2014 Antiguan general election

Crown of Antigua and Barbuda
- Monarch: Elizabeth II
- Governor-General: Dame Louise Lake-Tack; Sir Rodney Williams

Senate
- President: Alincia Williams-Grant
- Deputy President: Osbert Frederick

House of Representatives
- Speaker: Gerald Watt
- Deputy Speaker: Dean Jonas

The 14th legislature of Antigua and Barbuda was elected on 12 June 2014.

== Members ==
=== Senate ===
Representative	Party
Alincia Williams-Grant President of the Senate	ABLP
Osbert Richard Frederick Deputy President of the Senate	ABLP
Lennox Weston Leader of Government Business	ABLP
Harold Lovell Senate Minority Leader	UPP
Maureen Payne-Hyman	ABLP
Londell Benjamin	ABLP
Colin James	ABLP
Cheryl Mary Clare Hurst	ABLP
Daryll Matthew	ABLP
Aziza Lake	ABLP
Shenella Mary Shadida Govia	ABLP
Adrian Lee Government Senator from Barbuda	ABLP
Jacqui Quinn-Leandro	UPP
Shawn Nicholas	UPP
Damani Tabor	UPP
Calvin Hendren Parker	Governor General's Representative
Knacyntar Nedd	Barbuda Council

==== Changes to the Senate during the session ====
Name	Reason
Sylvia O'Mard	Former Governor General's Representative. Resigned August 2014
Harold Lovell	Former Opposition Senator - 23 June 2014 - 12 August 2014
Anthony Stuart	Former Opposition Senator. Resigned 1 October 2015
Wigley George	Former Government Senator Appointment revoked 13 Sep 2016
Michael Freeland	Former Government Senator. Resigned December 2017
Shenique Fortune	Former Barbuda Council senator. Replaced on 20 June 2016.

=== House of Representatives ===
The longest serving member in this House of Representatives was Robin Yearwood, at the time in his 9th term.

Party	Members Name	Constituency
ABLP	Gaston Browne Prime Minister	St. John's City West
ABLP	Melford Nicholas	St. John's City East
ABLP	Steadroy Benjamin	St. John's City South
ABLP	Eustace Lake	St. John's Rural South
ABLP	Lester Bird	St. John's Rural East
ABLP	Charles Fernandez	St. John's Rural North
ABLP	Molwyn Joseph	St. Mary's North
ABLP	Samantha Marshall	St. Mary's South
ABLP	Michael Browne	All Saints West
ABLP	Dean Jonas Deputy Speaker	St. George
ABLP	Asot Michael	St. Peter
ABLP	Robin Yearwood	St. Phillip North
ABLP	Paul Chet Greene	St. Paul
ABLP	Arthur Nibbs	Barbuda
UPP	Winston Baldwin Spencer Leader of the Opposition	St. John's Rural West
UPP	Willmoth Daniel	St. Phillip South
UPP	Joanne Massiah	All Saints East & St. Luke
