= 8th legislature of Antigua and Barbuda =

Parliament of Antigua and Barbuda (1984–1989)

The 8th legislature of Antigua and Barbuda was elected on Tuesday, 17 April 1984, and was dissolved on Monday, 20 February 1989.

It had its first meeting on Thursday, 31 May 1984.

It was the first parliament elected during Antigua and Barbuda's independence.

== Acts of Parliament ==
Name	Year
The Age of Majority Act	1984
The Antigua and Barbuda-Brazil Co-Operation (Ratification of Agreement) Act	1986
The Animals (International Movement and Disease) Act	1987
The Architects (Registration) Act	1987

== Members ==
=== Senate ===
Unknown

=== House of Representatives ===
Speaker: Casford Murray

Representative	Constituency	Party
Henderson Simon	St. John's City West	ALP
John St. Luce	St. John's City East	ALP
Christopher O'Mard	St. John's City South	ALP
Donald Christian	St. John's Rural West	ALP
Vere Bird Jr.	St. John's Rural South	ALP
Lester Bird	St. John's Rural East	ALP
Vere Bird Sr. Prime Minister	St. John's Rural North	ALP
Molwyn Joseph	St. Mary's North	ALP
Hugh Marshall	St. Mary's South	ALP
Eustace Cochrane	All Saints East & St. Luke	ALP
Hilroy Humphreys	All Saints West	ALP
Adolphus Freeland	St. George	ALP
Joseph Myers	St. Peter	ALP
Robin Yearwood	St. Phillip North	ALP
Reuben Henry Harris	St. Phillip South	ALP
Ernest Williams	St. Paul	ALP
Eric Burton Opposition Leader	Barbuda	IND
