= 7th legislature of Antigua and Barbuda =

Parliament of Antigua and Barbuda (1980–1984)

The 7th legislature of Antigua and Barbuda was elected on Thursday, 24 April 1980, and was dissolved on Thursday, 29 March 1984.

It was the first parliament of an independent Antigua and Barbuda, and the last one elected as a British colony.

The only member of this parliament that is a member of the current parliament is Steadroy Benjamin, then a senator.

== Members ==
=== Senate ===
Unknown

=== House of Representatives ===
Speaker: Casford Murray

Representative	Constituency	Party
George Piggott	St. John's City West	PLM
John St. Luce	St. John's City East	ALP
Christopher O'Mard	St. John's City South	ALP
Donald Christian	St. John's Rural West	ALP
Vere Bird Jr.	St. John's Rural South	ALP
Lester Bird	St. John's Rural East	ALP
Vere Bird Sr. Premier/Prime Minister	St. John's Rural North	ALP
Robert Hall	St. Mary's North	PLM
Hugh Marshall	St. Mary's South	ALP
Charlesworth Samuel	St. Lukes	PLM
Hilroy Humphreys	All Saints	ALP
Adolphus Freeland	St. George	ALP
Joseph Myers	St. Peter	ALP
Robin Yearwood	St. Phillip North	ALP
Reuben Henry Harris	St. Phillip South	ALP
Ernest Williams	St. Paul	ALP
Eric Burton	Barbuda	IND
