= 10th legislature of Antigua and Barbuda =

Parliament of Antigua and Barbuda (1994–1999)

The 10th legislature of Antigua and Barbuda was elected on 8 March 1994, and was dissolved on 19 February 1999.

== Members ==
=== Senate ===
Unknown

=== House of Representatives ===
| Party | Representative | Constituency |
|---|---|---|
| UPP | Donald Halstead | St. John's City West |
| ALP | John St. Luce | St. John's City East |
| ALP | Steadroy Benjamin | St. John's City South |
| UPP | Baldwin Spencer Leader of the Opposition | St. John's Rural West |
| ALP | Vere Bird Jr. | St. John's Rural South |
| ALP | Lester Bird Prime Minister | St. John's Rural East |
| ALP | Bernard Percival | St. John's Rural North |
| ALP | Molwyn Joseph | St. Mary's North |
| UPP | Hilson Baptiste | St. Mary's South |
| UPP | Charlesworth Samuel | All Saints East & St. Luke |
| ALP | Hilroy Humphreys | All Saints West |
| ALP | Adolphus Freeland | St. George |
| ALP | Longford Jeremy | St. Peter |
| ALP | Robin Yearwood | St. Phillip North |
| UPP | Wilmoth Daniel | St. Phillip South |
| ALP | Rodney Williams | St. Paul |
| BPM | Thomas Hilbourne Frank | Barbuda |
