= Ministry of Legal Affairs, Public Safety, Information and Labour =

The Ministry of Legal Affairs, Public Safety, Immigration and Labour is a ministerial department of the government of Antigua and Barbuda. The Minister of Legal Affairs simultaneously serves as the Attorney General.

== Ministers ==
A list of past and current ministers mainly serving after 1971 are listed as follows:

- Gerald Watt (1971-1976)
- Cosmos Phillips (1976-1979)
- Keith M. Ford (1979–1994)
- Clare Roberts (1994–1997)
- Radforth Wentworth Hill (1997–1999)
- Errol Cort (1999–2001)
- Lester Bird (2002–2004)
- Justin Simon (2004–2005)
- Colin Derrick (2006–2009)
- Justin Simon (2010–2014) [referred to as the Attorney General]
- Steadroy Benjamin (2014–present)

== See also ==
- Justice ministry
