= Deputy Prime Minister of Antigua and Barbuda =

Government role in Antigua and Barbuda

- Coat of arms of Antigua and Barbuda
- Style: The Honourable
- Member of: Cabinet
- Reports to: Prime Minister
- Appointer: Prime Minister
- Term length: Five years
- Precursor: Deputy Premier
- Formation: 11 February 1971 (as Deputy Premier)
- First holder: Sir Robert Hall

The deputy prime minister of Antigua and Barbuda is the deputy head of government of that country. Nobody holds the position currently.

Since 2014, there have been Senior Ministers appointed. First Lester Bird, then Robin Yearwood (from 2018 to 2023).

== Deputy Premier ==
Name	Political Party	Constituency	Premier	Took office	Left office	Source
Robert Hall	Progressive Labour Movement	St. Mary's North	George Walter	1971	1976	
Lester Bird	Antigua Labour Party		Vere Bird	February 1976	November 1982	

== Deputy Prime Minister ==
Name	Political Party	Constituency	Prime Minister	Took office	Left office	Source
Lester Bird	Antigua Labour Party	St. John's Rural East	Vere Bird	November 1982	1991	
Lester Bird	Antigua Labour Party	St. John's Rural East	Vere Bird	1992	March 1994	
Robin Yearwood	Antigua Labour Party	St. Philip's North	Lester Bird	26 January 2001	March 2004	
Willmoth Daniel	United Progressive Party	St. Philip's North	Baldwin Spencer	26 March 2004	May 2009	
Willmoth Daniel	United Progressive Party	St. Philip's North	Baldwin Spencer	2010	June 2014	
