= 2026 St. Philip's North by-election =

Election in Antigua

- 16 March 2026
- Turnout: 67.27%
Candidate	Randy Baltimore	Alex Browne
Party	ABLP	UPP
Popular vote	924	407
Percentage	69.42%	30.58%
MP before election
Robin Yearwood
ABLP
Elected MP
Randy Baltimore
ABLP

A by-election was held on 16 March 2026 in the Antiguan parliamentary seat of St. Philip's North following the resignation of long-time representative Robin Yearwood on 18 February. It was Antigua and Barbuda's fourth election since Prime Minister Gaston Browne emerged victorious in the 2023 general election. It was also the third by-election held outside of Barbuda since independence in 1981.

== Background ==
Robin Yearwood had been the longest serving legislator in the Caribbean and the Commonwealth prior to resigning at a sitting of parliament dedicated to his fiftieth anniversary of service. He resigned on 18 February 2026. While Yearwood had maintained a safe-constituency for five decades, the 2023 general election saw him win by only a couple percentage points, a stark contrast from his 70% average majority. Since the last election, there have been multiple by-elections, including a UPP victory in a 2023 by-election, prior to the party's credibility crisis. In January 2025, there was also a by-election in the neighbouring St. Peter constituency, another safe constituency that gave the ABLP a landslide with the election of Rawdon Turner. Due to Yearwood's advanced age, he did not hold any executive positions during his final term and was relegated to the position of deputy speaker of the house. In Antigua and Barbuda, a by-election must be held no more than 120 days following the resignation of a member. The governor-general has the legal authority to determine the date of by-elections. The election will be held on 16 March 2026.

Three days prior to Yearwood's resignation, a town hall including prime minister Gaston Browne and other senior government officials was announced for 19 February. The town hall is to be hosted by the ABLP candidate Randy Baltimore in Glanvilles. On 1 January, the UPP announced a slate of fifteen caretakers, including senator Alex Browne who has been a parliamentarian since 2023. Hours before Yearwood's resignation was made public, the Antigua and Barbuda Electoral Commission announced a significant human resources expansion, with 18 new staffers joining the body.

== Conduct ==
Prior to the election, Browne challenged Baltimore's eligibility to run for office, claiming that Baltimore was not eligible to run in the constituency due to his status as a civil servant. While Baltimore resigned his position five days prior to nomination day, Browne claims that Baltimore is ineligible as civil servants are required to give three months notice prior to their resignation having legal effect. Similar concerns were the cause of the 2023 by-election in St. Mary's South.

Polls opened at 06:00 AST and closed at 18:00 AST.

== Candidates ==
Candidate name	Political party
Randy Baltimore	ABLP
Alex Browne	UPP

== Polling divisions ==
Polling division	Settlements	Winner in 2023 election
"A"	Seatons, Glanvilles	UPP
"B"	Willikies, Long Bay	ABLP
"C"	Newfield, Collins	ABLP

== Results ==
Candidate	Party	Votes	%
Randy Baltimore	Antigua and Barbuda Labour Party	924	69.42
Alex Browne	United Progressive Party	407	30.58
Total		1,331	100.00
Valid votes		1,331	99.03
Invalid/blank votes		13	0.97
Total votes		1,344	100.00
Registered voters/turnout			–
Source: https://abec.gov.ag/spn/
