= Beazer (disambiguation) =

Beazer was a British housebuilding company.

Beazer may also refer to:

- Beazer Homes USA, a Fortune 500 company split off from the British company
- Randolph Beazer, Barbudan politician
- Beazer, Alberta, a hamlet in Canada

== See also ==
- Beezer (disambiguation)
