= Clare Roberts =

Deputy Governor-General of Antigua and Barbuda since 2014

Sir Clare Roberts
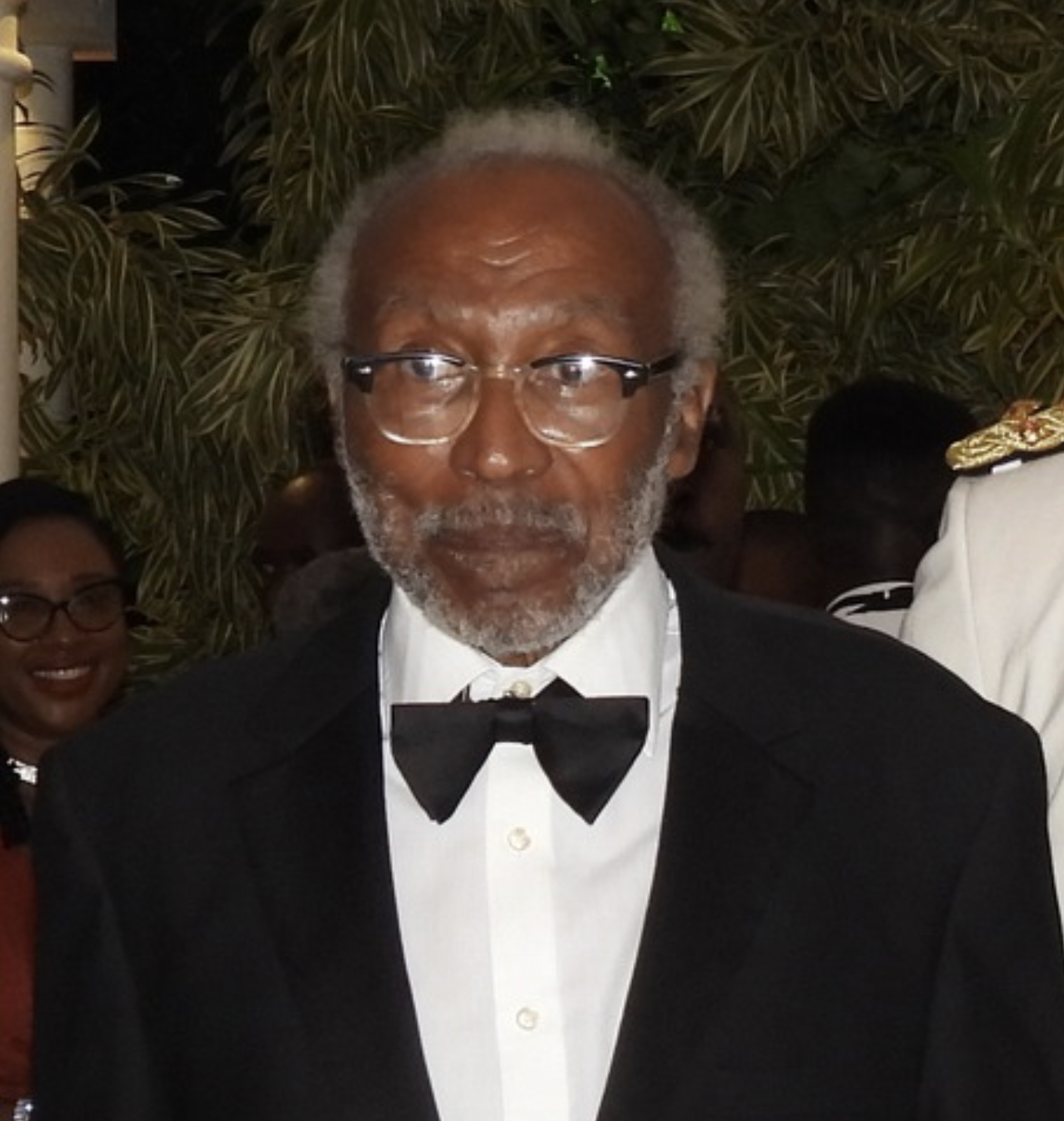

Deputy Governor-General of Antigua and Barbuda
- Incumbent
- Assumed office 9 September 2014
- Governor-General: Rodney Williams
- Preceded by: Eustace Francis

Attorney General of Antigua and Barbuda
- In office 1994–1997
- Prime Minister: Lester Bird
- Preceded by: Keith M. Ford
- Succeeded by: Radforth Wentworth Hill

Personal details
- Born: 1948 (age 77–78)
- Party: Antigua and Barbuda Labour Party

Sir Clare Roberts is an Antigua and Barbuda Labour Party politician, serving as the deputy governor-general of Antigua and Barbuda since 9 September 2014.

Roberts was born in 1948 in Antigua. He has a degree from the University of the West Indies. He in an attorney-at-law, and member of the bars of Antigua and Barbuda, Montserrat and British Virgin Islands. He was solicitor general of Antigua and Barbuda from 1983 to 1986.

Roberts served as Attorney-General of Antigua and Barbuda from 1994 until 1997, being an ex officio member of parliament.
