= Gordon Derrick =

Antiguan financial director

Personal details
- Born: 1968 (age 57–58) Villa, Saint John
- Died: June 19, 2022
- Education: Florida Institute of Technology, University of the West Indies
- Occupation: Mechanical engineer, entrepreneur

Gordon Derrick (1968 – June 19, 2022) was an Antiguan banker, football administrator, the director of the Antigua Commercial Bank between 2004–2015, and served as chairman of the board of directors of ACB Mortgage & Trust Ltd. from 2007–2016.

== Biography ==
Derrick was born in the state of Antigua and Barbuda, growing up in the neighbourhood of Villa, in St. John's, located in the Caribbean in 1968.

Derrick holds an MBA from the University of the West Indies and Bachelor of Science degree in mechanical engineering from the Florida Institute of Technology.

Derrick died on June 19, 2022, after collapsing in his home, with reports saying he raised concerns about feeling unwell the same day. He was driven to the hospital but died shortly after.

== Personal life ==
He grew up in the outskirts of Villa, Saint John. He was married and had two children.
