= Beezer =

Beezer may refer to:

- The Beezer, a British children's comic
- Robert Beezer (1928–2012), American federal judge
- John Vanbiesbrouck (born 1963), American ice hockey player nicknamed "Beezer"
- Beezer, robot companion to comic book character Captain Sternn

== See also ==
- Beazer (disambiguation)
