= Keith Thom =

Guyanese lawyer

Keith Thom is a Guyanese lawyer who has been a judge in Antigua and Barbuda and on the Eastern Caribbean Supreme Court.

Thom earned a bachelor of law degree at the University of the West Indies in Barbados. He worked in a private legal practice in Georgetown, Guyana for two years and in 1993 emigrated to Antigua and Barbuda to become the Director of Public Prosecutions. He held this position until being appointed a magistrate for Antigua and Barbuda in 2003.

In 2012, the Judicial and Legal Services Commission of the Caribbean Community appointed Thom as an Acting High Court Judge on the Eastern Caribbean Supreme Court; he was assigned to live in and hear cases from Antigua and Barbuda. Thom's wife Gertel Thom has been a High Court Judge on the same court since 2005, having been appointed to reside in and hear cases from Saint Vincent and the Grenadines.
