= George Piggott =

Antiguan politician

George Piggott MP

Member of the House of Representatives of Antigua and Barbuda
- In office 24 April 1980 – 29 March 1984
- Preceded by: Donald Halstead
- Succeeded by: Henderson Simon
- Constituency: St. John's City West

Personal details
- Party: Progressive Labour Movement

George Piggott was an Antiguan Progressive Labour Movement politician, who was first elected as Member of Parliament for St. John's City West in the 1980 general election.
