= Victor McKay =

Antiguan politician

Victor McKay MP

Member of the House of Representatives of Antigua and Barbuda
- In office 11 February 1971 – 5 April 1980
- Preceded by: Hugh Marshall
- Succeeded by: Constituency established
- Constituency: St. Mary's South

Personal details
- Died: 6 January 2025
- Party: Progressive Labour Movement

Victor McKay (died 6 January 2025) was an Antiguan Progressive Labour Movement politician, who was first elected as Member of Parliament for St. Mary's South in the 1971 general election. He was also a senator.
