= Weirs, Antigua and Barbuda =

Official historic site of Antigua and Barbuda

Weirs
- Location within Antigua and Barbuda
- 17°06′57.0″N 61°47′28.7″W
- Location: Saint George, Antigua and Barbuda

History
- Built: 1679

Historical Site of Antigua and Barbuda

Weirs is an official historic site in Saint George, Antigua and Barbuda. It was a sugar plantation established in 1679. The sugar mill tower continues to stand. 187 people were enslaved here at the time of emancipation. The family of Hugh Marshall was involved in the restoration of the estate house.
