= Randy Baltimore =

Antigua and Barbuda politician

Member of the House of Representatives of Antigua and Barbuda
- Incumbent
- Assumed office 27 March 2026
- Preceded by: Robin Yearwood
- Constituency: St. Philip's North

Personal details
- Party: Antigua and Barbuda Labour Party

Randy Baltimore is an Antigua and Barbuda Labour Party politician who was elected as parliamentary representative in the 2026 St. Philip's North by-election. His swearing in was delayed due to a challenge to his eligibility. He was sworn in on 27 March 2026.
