= Gertel Thom =

Guyanese politician

Gertel Uraine Thom

Attorney-General of Antigua and Barbuda
- In office 2001–2004

Personal details
- Born: Guyana

Gertel Uraine Thom is a Guyanese politician, who served as attorney-general of Antigua and Barbuda and as an ex officio member of the House of Representatives. Thom was also attorney-general of Montserrat and served on the high court of Saint Vincent and the Grenadines.

She is married to Keith Thom.
