= List of foreign ministers in 2004 =

This is a list of foreign ministers in 2004.

== Africa ==
- Algeria - Abdelaziz Belkhadem (2000–2005)
- Angola - João Bernardo de Miranda (1999–2008)
- Benin - Rogatien Biaou (2003–2006)
- Botswana - Mompati Merafhe (1994–2008)
- Burkina Faso - Youssouf Ouedraogo (1999–2007)
- Burundi - Terence Sinunguruza (2001–2005)
- Cameroon -
  1. François Xavier Ngoubeyou (2001–2004)
  2. Laurent Esso (2004–2006)
- Cape Verde -
  1. Fátima Veiga (2002–2004)
  2. Víctor Borges (2004–2008)
- Central African Republic - Charles Wénézoui (2003–2005)
- Chad - Nagoum Yamassoum (2003–2005)
- Comoros - Mohamed El-Amine Souef (2002–2005)
- Republic of Congo - Rodolphe Adada (1997–2007)
- Democratic Republic of Congo -
  1. Antoine Ghonda (2003–2004)
  2. Raymond Ramazani Baya (2004–2007)
- Côte d'Ivoire - Bamba Mamadou (2003–2006)
- Djibouti - Ali Abdi Farah (1999–2005)
- Egypt -
  1. Ahmed Maher (2001–2004)
  2. Ahmed Aboul Gheit (2004–2011)
- Equatorial Guinea - Pastor Micha Ondó Bile (2003–2012)
- Eritrea - Ali Said Abdella (2000–2005)
- Ethiopia - Seyoum Mesfin (1991–2010)
- Gabon - Jean Ping (1999–2008)
- The Gambia -
  1. Baboucarr-Blaise Jagne (2001–2004)
  2. Sidi Moro Sanneh (2004–2005)
- Ghana - Nana Akufo-Addo (2003–2007)
- Guinea -
  1. François Lonseny Fall (2002–2004)
  2. Mamady Condé (2004–2006)
- Guinea-Bissau -
  1. João José Monteiro (2003–2004)
  2. Soares Sambu (2004–2005)
- Kenya -
  1. Kalonzo Musyoka (2003–2004)
  2. Chirau Ali Mwakwere (2004–2005)
- Lesotho -
  1. Mohlabi Tsekoa (2002–2004)
  2. Monyane Moleleki (2004–2007)
- Liberia - Thomas Nimely (2003–2006)
- Libya - Abdel Rahman Shalgham (2000–2009)
- Madagascar - Marcel Ranjeva (2002–2009)
- Malawi -
  1. Lilian Patel (2000–2004)
  2. George Chaponda (2004–2005)
- Mali -
  1. Lassana Traoré (2002–2004)
  2. Moctar Ouane (2004–2011)
- Mauritania - Mohamed Vall Ould Bellal (2003–2005)
- Mauritius - Jaya Krishna Cuttaree (2003–2005)
- Morocco - Mohamed Benaissa (1999–2007)
  - Western Sahara - Mohamed Salem Ould Salek (1998–2023)
- Mozambique - Leonardo Simão (1994–2005)
- Namibia -
  1. Hidipo Hamutenya (2002–2004)
  2. Marco Hausiku (2004–2010)
- Niger - Aïchatou Mindaoudou (2001–2010)
- Nigeria - Oluyemi Adeniji (2003–2006)
- Rwanda - Charles Murigande (2002–2008)
- São Tomé and Príncipe -
  1. Mateus Meira Rita (2002–2004)
  2. Óscar Sousa (2004)
  3. Ovídio Manuel Barbosa Pequeno (2004–2006)
- Senegal - Cheikh Tidiane Gadio (2000–2009)
- Seychelles - Jérémie Bonnelame (1997–2005)
- Sierra Leone - Momodu Koroma (2002–2007)
- Somalia -
  1. Yusuf Hassan Ibrahim (2002–2004)
  2. Abdullahi Sheikh Ismail (2004–2006)
  - Somaliland - Edna Adan Ismail (2003–2006)
- South Africa - Nkosazana Dlamini-Zuma (1999–2009)
- Sudan - Mustafa Osman Ismail (1998–2005)
- Swaziland - Mabili Dlamini (2003–2006)
- Tanzania - Jakaya Kikwete (1995–2005)
- Togo - Kokou Tozoun (2003–2005)
- Tunisia -
  1. Habib Ben Yahia (1999–2004)
  2. Abdelbaki Hermassi (2004–2005)
- Uganda -
  1. James Wapakhabulo (2001–2004)
  2. Tom Butime (2004–2005)
- Zambia - Kalombo Mwansa (2002–2005)
- Zimbabwe - Stan Mudenge (1995–2005)

== Asia ==
- Afghanistan - Abdullah Abdullah (2001–2006)
- Armenia - Vartan Oskanian (1998–2008)
- Azerbaijan -
  1. Vilayat Guliyev (1999–2004)
  2. Elmar Mammadyarov (2004–2020)
  - Nagorno-Karabakh -
    1. Ashot Gulyan (2002–2004)
    2. Arman Melikyan (2004–2005)
- Bahrain - Sheikh Muhammad ibn Mubarak ibn Hamad Al Khalifah (1971–2005)
- Bangladesh - Morshed Khan (2001–2006)
- Bhutan - Khandu Wangchuk (2003–2007)
- Brunei - Pengiran Muda Mohamed Bolkiah (1984–2015)
- Cambodia - Hor Namhong (1998–2016)
- China - Li Zhaoxing (2003–2007)
- East Timor - José Ramos-Horta (2000–2006)
- Georgia -
  1. Tedo Japaridze (2003–2004)
  2. Salome Zourabichvili (2004–2005)
  - Abkhazia -
    1. Sergei Shamba (1997–2004)
    2. Georgy Otyrba (acting) (2004)
    3. Igor Akhba (2004)
    4. Sergei Shamba (2004–2010)
  - South Ossetia - Murat Dzhioyev (1998–2012)
- India -
  1. Yashwant Sinha (2002–2004)
  2. Natwar Singh (2004–2005)
- Indonesia - Hassan Wirajuda (2001–2009)
- Iran - Kamal Kharazi (1997–2005)
- Iraq - Hoshyar Zebari (2003–2014)
- Israel - Silvan Shalom (2003–2006)
  - Palestinian Authority - Nabil Shaath (2003–2005)
- Japan -
  1. Yoriko Kawaguchi (2002–2004)
  2. Nobutaka Machimura (2004–2005)
- Jordan -
  1. Marwan al-Muasher (2002–2004)
  2. Hani al-Mulki (2004–2005)
- Kazakhstan - Kassym-Jomart Tokayev (2002–2007)
- North Korea - Paek Nam-sun (1998–2007)
- South Korea -
  1. Yoon Young-kwan (2003–2004)
  2. Ban Ki-moon (2004–2006)
- Kuwait - Sheikh Mohammad Sabah Al-Salem Al-Sabah (2003–2011)
- Kyrgyzstan - Askar Aitmatov (2002–2005)
- Laos - Somsavat Lengsavad (1993–2006)
- Lebanon -
  1. Jean Obeid (2003–2004)
  2. Mahmoud Hammoud (2004–2005)
- Malaysia - Syed Hamid Albar (1999–2008)
- Maldives - Fathulla Jameel (1978–2005)
- Mongolia -
  1. Luvsangiin Erdenechuluun (2000–2004)
  2. Tsendiin Mönkh-Orgil (2004–2006)
- Myanmar -
  1. Win Aung (1998–2004)
  2. Nyan Win (2004–2011)
- Nepal -
  1. Surya Bahadur Thapa (2003–2004)
  2. Bhekh Bahadur Thapa (2004)
  3. Sher Bahadur Deuba (2004–2005)
- Oman - Yusuf bin Alawi bin Abdullah (1982–2020)
- Pakistan - Khurshid Mahmud Kasuri (2002–2007)
- Philippines -
  1. Delia Albert (2003–2004)
  2. Alberto Romulo (2004–2011)
- Qatar - Sheikh Hamad bin Jassim bin Jaber Al Thani (1992–2013)
- Saudi Arabia - Prince Saud bin Faisal bin Abdulaziz Al Saud (1975–2015)
- Singapore -
  1. S. Jayakumar (1994–2004)
  2. George Yeo (2004–2011)
- Sri Lanka -
  1. Tyronne Fernando (2001–2004)
  2. Lakshman Kadirgamar (2004–2005)
- Syria - Farouk al-Sharaa (1984–2006)
- Taiwan -
  1. Eugene Chien (2002–2004)
  2. Mark Chen (2004–2006)
- Tajikistan - Talbak Nazarov (1994–2006)
- Thailand - Surakiart Sathirathai (2001–2005)
- Turkey - Abdullah Gül (2003–2007)
- Turkmenistan - Raşit Meredow (2001–present)
- United Arab Emirates - Rashid Abdullah Al Nuaimi (1980–2006)
- Uzbekistan - Sodiq Safoyev (2003–2005)
- Vietnam - Nguyễn Dy Niên (2000–2006)
- Yemen - Abu Bakr al-Qirbi (2001–2014)

== Australia and Oceania ==
- Australia - Alexander Downer (1996–2007)
- Fiji - Kaliopate Tavola (2000–2006)
- French Polynesia -
  1. Gaston Flosse (1991–2004)
  2. Oscar Temaru (2004)
  3. Gaston Flosse (2004–2005)
- Kiribati - Anote Tong (2003–2016)
- Marshall Islands - Gerald Zackios (2001–2008)
- Micronesia - Sebastian Anefal (2003–2007)
- Nauru -
  1. René Harris (2003–2004)
  2. David Adeang (2004–2007)
- New Zealand - Phil Goff (1999–2005)
  - Cook Islands -
    1. Robert Woonton (1999–2004)
    2. Tom Marsters (2004–2005)
  - Niue - Young Vivian (2002–2008)
- Palau - Temmy Shmull (2001–2009)
- Papua New Guinea - Sir Rabbie Namaliu (2002–2006)
- Samoa - Tuilaepa Aiono Sailele Malielegaoi (1998–2021)
- Solomon Islands - Laurie Chan (2002–2006)
- Tonga -
  1. Prince 'Ulukalala Lavaka Ata (1998–2004)
  2. Sonatane Tu'a Taumoepeau Tupou (2004–2009)
- Tuvalu -
  1. Saufatu Sopoanga (2002–2004)
  2. Maatia Toafa (2004–2006)
- Vanuatu -
  1. Moana Carcasses Kalosil (2003–2004)
  2. Barak Sopé (2004)
  3. Marcellino Pipite (2004)
  4. Sato Kilman (2004–2007)

== Europe ==
- Albania - Kastriot Islami (2003–2005)
- Andorra - Juli Minoves Triquell (2001–2007)
- Austria -
  1. Benita Ferrero-Waldner (2000–2004)
  2. Ursula Plassnik (2004–2008)
- Belarus - Sergei Martynov (2003–2012)
- Belgium -
  1. Louis Michel (1999–2004)
  2. Karel De Gucht (2004–2009)
  - Brussels-Capital Region - Guy Vanhengel (2000–2009)
  - Flanders -
    1. Patricia Ceysens (2003–2004)
    2. Geert Bourgeois (2004–2008)
  - Wallonia - Marie-Dominique Simonet (2004–2009)
- Bosnia and Herzegovina - Mladen Ivanić (2003–2007)
- Bulgaria - Solomon Passy (2001–2005)
- Croatia - Miomir Žužul (2003–2005)
- Cyprus - Georgios Iacovou (2003–2006)
  - Northern Cyprus -
    1. Tahsin Ertuğruloğlu (1998–2004)
    2. Serdar Denktaş (2004–2006)
- Czech Republic - Cyril Svoboda (2002–2006)
- Denmark - Per Stig Møller (2001–2010)
  - Greenland - Josef Motzfeldt (2003–2007)
- Estonia - Kristiina Ojuland (2002–2005)
- Finland - Erkki Tuomioja (2000–2007)
- France -
  1. Dominique de Villepin (2002–2004)
  2. Michel Barnier (2004–2005)
- Germany - Joschka Fischer (1998–2005)
- Greece -
  1. George Papandreou (1999–2004)
  2. Tassos Giannitsis (acting) (2004)
  3. Petros Molyviatis (2004–2006)
- Hungary -
  1. László Kovács (2002–2004)
  2. Ferenc Somogyi (2004–2006)
- Iceland -
  1. Halldór Ásgrímsson (1995–2004)
  2. Davíð Oddsson (2004–2005)
- Ireland -
  1. Brian Cowen (2000–2004)
  2. Dermot Ahern (2004–2008)
- Italy -
  1. Franco Frattini (2002–2004)
  2. Gianfranco Fini (2004–2006)
- Latvia -
  1. Sandra Kalniete (2002–2004)
  2. Rihards Pīks (2004)
  3. Helēna Demakova (acting) (2004)
  4. Artis Pabriks (2004–2007)
- Liechtenstein - Ernst Walch (2001–2005)
- Lithuania - Antanas Valionis (2000–2006)
- Luxembourg -
  1. Lydie Polfer (1999–2004)
  2. Charles Goerens (2004)
  3. Jean Asselborn (2004–present)
- Republic of Macedonia - Ilinka Mitreva (2002–2006)
- Malta -
  1. Joe Borg (1999–2004)
  2. John Dalli (2004)
  3. Michael Frendo (2004–2008)
- Moldova -
  1. Nicolae Dudău (2001–2004)
  2. Andrei Stratan (2004–2009)
  - Transnistria - Valeriy Litskai (2000–2008)
- Netherlands - Ben Bot (2003–2007)
- Norway - Jan Petersen (2001–2005)
- Poland - Włodzimierz Cimoszewicz (2001–2005)
- Portugal -
  1. Teresa Patrício de Gouveia (2003–2004)
  2. António Monteiro (2004–2005)
- Romania -
  1. Mircea Geoană (2000–2004)
  2. Mihai Răzvan Ungureanu (2004–2007)
- Russia -
  1. Igor Ivanov (1998–2004)
  2. Sergey Lavrov (2004–present)
- San Marino - Fabio Berardi (2003–2006)
- Serbia and Montenegro -
  1. Goran Svilanović (2000–2004)
  2. Vuk Drašković (2004–2007)
  - Montenegro -
    1. Dragiša Burzan (2003–2004)
    2. Miodrag Vlahović (2004–2006)
- Slovakia - Eduard Kukan (1998–2006)
- Slovenia -
  1. Dimitrij Rupel (2000–2004)
  2. Ivo Vajgl (2004)
  3. Dimitrij Rupel (2004–2008)
- Spain -
  1. Ana de Palacio y del Valle-Lersundi (2002–2004)
  2. Miguel Ángel Moratinos (2004–2010)
- Sweden - Laila Freivalds (2003–2006)
- Switzerland - Micheline Calmy-Rey (2003–2011)
- Ukraine - Kostyantyn Gryshchenko (2003–2005)
- United Kingdom - Jack Straw (2001–2006)
- Vatican City - Archbishop Giovanni Lajolo (2003–2006)

== North America and the Caribbean ==
- Antigua and Barbuda -
  1. Lester Bird (1991–2004)
  2. Harold Lovell (2004–2005)
- The Bahamas - Fred Mitchell (2002–2007)
- Barbados - Dame Billie Miller (1994–2008)
- Belize - Godfrey Smith (2003-2003)
- Canada -
  1. Bill Graham (2002–2004)
  2. Pierre Pettigrew (2004–2006)
  - Quebec - Monique Gagnon-Tremblay (2003–2008)
- Costa Rica - Roberto Tovar Faja (2002–2006)
- Cuba - Felipe Pérez Roque (1999–2009)
- Dominica - Osborne Riviere (2001–2005)
- Dominican Republic -
  1. Frank Guerrero Prats (2003–2004)
  2. Carlos Morales Troncoso (2004–2014)
- El Salvador -
  1. María Eugenia Brizuela de Ávila (1999–2004)
  2. Francisco Laínez (2004–2008)
- Grenada - Elvin Nimrod (2000–2008)
- Guatemala -
  1. Edgar Armando Gutiérrez Girón (2002–2004)
  2. Jorge Briz Abularach (2004–2006)
- Haiti -
  1. Joseph Philippe Antonio (2001–2004)
  2. Yvon Siméon (2004–2005)
- Honduras - Leonidas Rosa Bautista (2003–2005)
- Jamaica - Keith Desmond Knight (2001–2006)
- Mexico - Luis Ernesto Derbez (2003–2006)
- Netherlands Antilles - Etienne Ys (2004–2006)
- Nicaragua - Norman José Caldera Cardenal (2002–2007)
- Panama -
  1. Harmodio Arias Cerjack (2003–2004)
  2. Samuel Lewis Navarro (2004–2009)
- Puerto Rico – Jose Izquierdo Encarnacion (2003–2005)
- Saint Kitts and Nevis - Timothy Harris (2001–2008)
- Saint Lucia -
  1. Julian Hunte (2001–2004)
  2. Petrus Compton (2004–2006)
- Saint Vincent and the Grenadines - Louis Straker (2001–2005)
- Trinidad and Tobago - Knowlson Gift (2001–2006)
- United States - Colin Powell (2001–2005)

== South America ==
- Argentina - Rafael Bielsa (2003–2005)
- Bolivia - Juan Ignacio Siles (2003–2005)
- Brazil - Celso Amorim (2003–2011)
- Chile -
  1. Soledad Alvear (2000–2004)
  2. Ignacio Walker Prieto (2004–2006)
- Colombia - Carolina Barco (2002–2006)
- Ecuador - Patricio Zuquilanda (2003–2005)
- Guyana - Rudy Insanally (2001–2008)
- Paraguay - Leila Rachid de Cowles (2003–2006)
- Peru - Manuel Rodríguez Cuadros (2003–2005)
- Suriname - Marie Levens (2000–2005)
- Uruguay - Didier Opertti (1998–2005)
- Venezuela -
  1. Roy Chaderton (2002–2004)
  2. Jesús Pérez (2004)
  3. Alí Rodríguez Araque (2004–2006)
