= Villa, St. John's =

Neighbourhood in Saint John Parish, Antigua,

Villa
- Neighbourhood
- Location within Antigua and Barbuda
- Coordinates: 17.128611°N 61.848889°W
- Country: Antigua and Barbuda
- Island: Antigua
- Civil parish: Saint John Parish

Government
  - Type: Village Council (possibly dissolved)

Population (2011)
  - Total: 484
- Time zone: UTC-4 (AST)

Villa is a neighbourhood in St. John's, Antigua and Barbuda.

== History ==
=== Villa Mill ===
The manor house had a location on a knoll to the north of St. John's, with a view to the west, which looked out over St. John's harbor and Fort James. Around the year 1872, the Villa Estate and Gamble's (#14) worked together to transform the sugar mill operations into steam-powered ones. On this property, there are no remnants of the old stone works or machinery, and there is no mill that can be found anywhere.

Up until the 1950s, this region was still considered part of the countryside. At one point, Fort Road was traversed by one of the locomotive lines right where the Kentucky Fried Chicken drive-through restaurant is now located. Even in the fifties, this was a residential neighborhood; however, as St. John's has expanded into the surrounding area, it has become increasingly commercialized.

The only child of Earle Linsey Daniel and Anne Lindsey, Anne Lindsey was born on March 5, 1759, and she went on to become the Attorney General of Dominica. She died in 1806. The title of Lord Baronet, also known as Viscount Combermere, was bestowed upon Stapleton Cotton and his family by Combermere Abbey, which is located in England. The first Baronet of the Stapleton family, Sir William Stapleton, established the Stapleton lands and interests in the Leeward Islands, which are located in the West Indies. When he died in 1686, he owned land or had land interests on four different islands. The Bangor University in England is the repository for the Stapleton Cotton manuscripts.

Philip Lyne Thomson, the owner of the Villa, was compensated £702. 5s. 2p (Antigua 106) in 1833 when the British Parliament passed legislation to abolish slavery. In exchange for freeing 41 slaves, Philip Lyne Thomson received this payment. There was an additional payment of £1,241.12.3 (Antigua 107), which was made for the freedom of 81 slaves; however, the records do not indicate who was awarded this sum.

In the year 1878, Stapleton Cotton and his family of Combermere Abbey in England were honored with the titles of Lord, Baronet, and Viscount Combermere. The Stapleton lands and interests in the Leeward Islands, which are located in the West Indies, were initially established by Sir William Stapleton, the first Baronet, who died in 1686.

"When Millie Este was still residing in the Buff house in the 1940s, my mother frequently paid her visits. The Rialto Club was established in 1951 in the former Buff house, which was located off Whapping Lane between Back street and Alfred Peters street. The Rialto Club served as a gathering place for young people to play games such as table tennis, warrie, dominoes, and card games. The illustrious discussion on the relative merits of Christianity and Islam that took place in 1951 at the Rialto Club and was led by Dean Baker, Arnold Chambers, and Al Haji Talib Dawud was also held there. That evening, Islam emerged victorious."

==== Selvyn Walter, Not A Drum Was Heard. ====
"Tom Henry, who was one of the first people to found the ALP (Antigua Labour Party), owned a considerable amount of land close to the old Buff house, which was formerly called Cassie Pasteur. Approximately in the year 1951, he began selling lots in Cassie Pasteur. In the 1950s and 1960s, "The Villa Buff House" as I knew it was located on the hill behind the Barrymore Hotel, and Mr. Fane was the most recent resident of the house. The inheritance used to be a farm where animals were raised, and Mr. Fane managed the land for Brysons, the company that sold the meat. When Dr. Noel Margetson purchased the land in the late 1950s or early 1960s, he had the existing home demolished so that he could construct a new structure there."

==== Margaret White. ====
"The residence of Dr. Margetson, which was built in 2010 using gorgeous Antigua green stone sourced from the Liberta region, is now the location of the Winter Clinic, which is located in close proximity to the Adelin Clinic. The Villa is a village that is located to the north of Dickinson Bay Street in its modern form."

== Demographics ==
Villa has two enumeration districts.

- 19000 Villa (East)
- 19100 Villa (Central)

=== Census data ===
Q48 Ethnic	Counts	%
African descendent	422	87.15%
Caucasian/White	1	0.22%
East Indian/India	4	0.87%
Mixed (Other)	27	5.66%
Hispanic	12	2.40%
Other	6	1.31%
Don't know/Not stated	12	2.40%
Total	484	100.00%

Q49 Religion	Counts	%
Adventist	42	8.89%
Anglican	84	17.78%
Baptist	55	11.56%
Church of God	24	5.11%
Evangelical	3	0.67%
Methodist	4	0.89%
Moravian	22	4.67%
Nazarene	25	5.33%
None/no religion	52	10.89%
Pentecostal	65	13.78%
Rastafarian	6	1.33%
Roman Catholic	37	7.78%
Wesleyan Holiness	14	2.89%
Other	27	5.78%
Don't know/Not stated	13	2.67%
Total	474	100.00%
NotApp :	9	

Q53 Insurance	Counts	%
Yes	242	50.11%
No	238	49.24%
Don't know/Not stated	3	0.65%
Total	484	100.00%

Q55 Internet Use	Counts	%
Yes	233	48.15%
No	250	51.63%
Don't know/Not stated	1	0.22%
Total	484	100.00%

Q58 Birth Place	Counts	%
In this country	316	66.52%
Abroad	159	33.48%
Total	475	100.00%
Missing :	8	

Q58. Country of birth	Counts	%
Antigua and Barbuda	316	65.36%
Other Caribbean countries	1	0.22%
Other Asian countries	1	0.22%
Other European countries	1	0.22%
Dominica	20	4.14%
Dominican Republic	11	2.18%
Guyana	70	14.38%
Jamaica	32	6.54%
Monsterrat	3	0.65%
St. Lucia	1	0.22%
St. Vincent and the Grenadines	4	0.87%
Trinidad and Tobago	3	0.65%
USA	8	1.74%
USVI United States Virgin Islands	3	0.65%
Not Stated	9	1.96%
Total	484	100.00%

Q71 Country of Citizenship 1	Counts	%
Antigua and Barbuda	370	76.47%
Other Caribbean countries	1	0.22%
Dominica	14	2.83%
Dominican Republic	3	0.65%
Guyana	52	10.68%
Jamaica	27	5.66%
Monsterrat	1	0.22%
St. Vincent and the Grenadines	2	0.44%
Trinidad and Tobago	1	0.22%
United Kingdom	1	0.22%
USA	3	0.65%
Not Stated	8	1.74%
Total	484	100.00%

Q71 Country of Citizenship 2 (Country of Second Citizenship)	Counts	%
Other Caribbean countries	6	9.37%
Dominica	4	6.25%
Dominican Republic	7	10.94%
Guyana	20	29.69%
Jamaica	5	7.81%
Monsterrat	2	3.13%
St. Lucia	1	1.56%
St. Vincent and the Grenadines	2	3.13%
Trinidad and Tobago	2	3.13%
USA	13	18.75%
Other countries	4	6.25%
Total	67	100.00%

Q91 Business Earning (Earnings a business made)	Counts	%
Under 1,000 $EC per month	6	42.86%
1,000 to 1,999 $EC per month	3	21.43%
2,000 to 2,999 $EC per month	2	14.29%
3,000 to 4,999 $EC per month	1	7.14%
5,000 $EC and over per month	2	14.29%
Total	15	100.00%
NotApp :	456	
Missing :	13	

Employment status	Counts	%
Employed	227	59.39%
Unemployed	31	8.01%
Inactive	123	32.32%
Not stated	1	0.28%
Total	382	100.00%
NotApp :	102	

== Notable people ==
- Gordon Derrick, former director of the Antigua Commercial Bank
- Gaston Browne, Prime Minister of Antigua and Barbuda
