= Ministry of Finance, Corporate Governance and Public Private Partnerships =

Government ministry in Antigua and Barbuda

Agency overview
- Jurisdiction: Antigua and Barbuda Government of Antigua and Barbuda
- Headquarters: High Street, St. John's
- Minister responsible: Gaston Browne
- Parent agency: Government of Antigua and Barbuda
- Website: https://ab.gov.ag/detail_page.php?page=13

The Ministry of Finance, Corporate Governance and Public Private Partnerships is a government ministry of Antigua and Barbuda responsible for the management of public finances, economic planning, revenue and budgeting.

== Ministers of finance ==
Name	Took office	Left office
V. C. Bird	1960	1971
George Walter	1971	1974
Sydney U. Prince	1974	1976
Reuben Harris	1976	1978
John Eugene St. Luce	1978	1982
V. C. Bird	1982	1982
John Eugene St. Luce	1982	1991
Lester Bird	1991	1991
Molwyn Joseph	1991	1994
John Eugene St. Luce	1994	1994
Molwyn Joseph	1994	1996
John Eugene St. Luce	1996	2001
Lester Bird	2001	2003
Robin Yearwood	2003	2004
Errol Cort	2004	2009
Harold Lovell	2009	2014
Gaston Browne	2014	Incumbent

== See also ==
- Government of Antigua and Barbuda
- Eastern Caribbean Central Bank
- Economy of Antigua and Barbuda
