= St. John's City South =

Parliamentary constituency in Antigua and Barbuda

Coordinates: 17°6′50″N 61°50′40″W

- Parliamentary constituency for the Parliament of Antigua and Barbuda
- Parish: Saint John
- Polling divisions: 7
- Electorate: 2,107 (2026)

Current constituency
- Seats: 1
- Party: ABLP
- Member: Steadroy Benjamin

St. John's City South is a parliamentary constituency in St. John's, Antigua and Barbuda. In 2018, the constituency had 1,652 registered electors, up from 1,459 in 2014.

== Voting trends ==
Voting by party
Party	1971	1976	1980	1984	1989	1994	1999	2004	2009	2014	2018	2023	2026
ALP	31.60%	50.97%	56.97%	68.03%	55.82%	60.34%	65.35%	51.80%	56.01%	62.92%	69.60%	63.18%	71.71%
UPP	-	-	-	28.35%	37.80%	34.65%	34.65%	48.20%	43.31%	37.08%	27.60%	35.18%	28.29%
PLM	57.48%	49.03%	43.03%	3.62%	-	-	-	-	-	-	-	-	-
Others	10.92%	0.00%	0.00%	0.00%	6.37%	5.01%	0.00%	0.00%	0.69%	0.00%	1.78%	0.78%	0.00%
Valid	1,190	1,236	1,048	857	910	1,059	1,293	1,280	1,457	1,316	1,286	1,410	1,237
Invalid	12	2	8	-	6	12	11	12	14	7		11	48
Total	1,202	1,238	1,056	857	916	1,071	1,304	1,292	1,471	1,323		1,421	1,285
Registered	2,816	1,306	1,388	1,605	1,706	1,901	2,103	1,432	1,849	1,459	1,652	2,060	2,107
Turnout	42.68%	94.79%	76.08%	53.40%	53.69%	56.34%	62.01%	90.22%	79.56%	90.68%		68.98%	60.99%

== Members of Parliament ==
Members of Parliament
Year	Winner	Party	% Votes
1971	Sydney Christian	PLM	57.48%
1976	Christopher O'Mard	ABP	50.97%
1980	Christopher O'Mard	ABP	56.97%
1984	Christopher O'Mard	ABP	68.03%
1989	Christopher O'Mard	ABP	55.82%
1994	Steadroy Benjamin	ABP	60.34%
1999	Steadroy Benjamin	ABP	65.35%
2004	Steadroy Benjamin	ABP	51.80%
2009	Steadroy Benjamin	ABP	56.01%
2014	Steadroy Benjamin	ABLP	62.92%
2018	Steadroy Benjamin	ABLP	70.31%
2023	Steadroy Benjamin	ABLP	63.18%
2026	Steadroy Benjamin	ABLP	71.71%
