= Shenique Fortune =

Antigua and Barbuda politician

Member of the Senate of Antigua and Barbuda
- In office 24 June 2014 – 20 June 2016; Barbuda Council senator
- Preceded by: Randolph Beazer
- Succeeded by: Knacyntar Nedd

Personal details
- Political party: Antigua and Barbuda Labour Party

Shenique Fortune is an Antigua and Barbuda Labour Party politician, who was appointed to the Senate of Antigua and Barbuda for the Barbuda Council on 24 June 2014. On 20 June 2016, Fortune was replaced by Knacyntar Nedd due to undisclosed health issues.
