= St. Philip's North =

Parliamentary constituency in Antigua and Barbuda

Coordinates: 17°5′20″N 61°42′25″W

- Parliamentary constituency for the Parliament of Antigua and Barbuda
- Parish: Saint Philip
- Polling divisions: 6
- Population: 2,427 (2011)
- Electorate: 2,060 (2026)
- Major settlements: Seatons, Glanvilles, Willikies and Newfield

Current constituency
- Seats: 1
- Party: ABLP
- Member: Randy Baltimore

St. Philip's North is a parliamentary constituency in Saint Philip Parish, Antigua and Barbuda.

It has 1,654 registered voters as of 2018. The constituencies counting centre is the Nelvi N. Gore Primary School, in Willikies.

A by-election is due to be held in the constituency on or before 18 June 2026.

== Electoral history ==
Party	1971	1976	1980	1984	1989	1994	1999	2004	2009	2014	2018	2023	2026
ALP	51.21%	66.84%	71.43%	79.69%	82.06%	72.64%	73.80%	62.06%	58.32%	66.23%	70.49%	52.60%	63.58%
UPP	-	-	-	20.31%	16.34%	27.36%	26.20%	37.94%	41.68%	33.77%	28.30%	45.69%	26.42%
PLM	45.82%	33.16%	26.66%	-	-	-	-	-	-	-	-	-	-
Others	2.96%	0.00%	1.91%	0.00%	1.61%	0.00%	0.00%	0.00%	0.00%	0.00%	0.00%	1.18%	0.00%
Valid	742	1,131	1,099	1,034	1,059	1,184	1,378	1,331	1,413	1,436	1,239	1,339	1,442
Invalid	16	8	16	6	8	8	7	8	27	10	15	7	19
Total	758	1,139	1,115	1,040	1,067	1,192	1,385	1,339	1,440	1,446	1,254	1,346	1,461
Registered	1,184	1,185	1,341	1,487	1,678	1,867	2,115	1,500	1,693	1,580		1,876	2,060
Turnout	64.02%	96.12%	83.15%	69.94%	63.59%	63.85%	65.48%	89.27%	85.06%	91.52%		71.75%	70.92%

== Members of the parliament ==
Year	Winner	Party	% Votes
1971	Donald Sheppard	ALP	51.21%
1976	Robin Yearwood	ALP	66.84%
1980	Robin Yearwood	ALP	71.43%
1984	Robin Yearwood	ALP	79.69%
1989	Robin Yearwood	ALP	82.06%
1994	Robin Yearwood	ALP	72.64%
1999	Robin Yearwood	ALP	73.80%
2004	Robin Yearwood	ALP	62.06%
2009	Robin Yearwood	ALP	58.32%
2014	Robin Yearwood	ABLP	66.23%
2018	Robin Yearwood	ABLP	71.35%
2023	Robin Yearwood	ABLP	52.8%
2026 by-election	Randy Baltimore	ABLP	69.42%
2026	Randy Baltimore	ABLP	73.58%
