= Mervyn Richards =

Antigua and Barbudan footballer and cricketer (born 1953)

Personal information
- Date of birth: 8 November 1953 (age 72)
- Place of birth: Antigua

Senior career*
Years	Team	Apps	(Gls)
1973–1978	National Supa Stars		
1979–1983	Lion Hill Spliff		
1984–1989	Cavalier F.C.		
1989–1991	Wadadli F.C.		
1994	Lion Hill Spliff		

International career
1984	Antigua and Barbuda		
- * Club domestic league appearances and goals

Mervyn Richards is a former Antiguan international footballer and cricketer.

He played for Antigua and Barbuda in their 1986 FIFA World Cup qualification campaign, featuring in two games against Haiti in August 1984; a 2–1 victory and a 4–0 loss.

He is the younger brother of cricketer Viv Richards. From 2004 to 2008, he served as president of the Antigua and Barbuda Football Association.
