= Justin Simon (politician) =

Antiguan politician (born 1951)

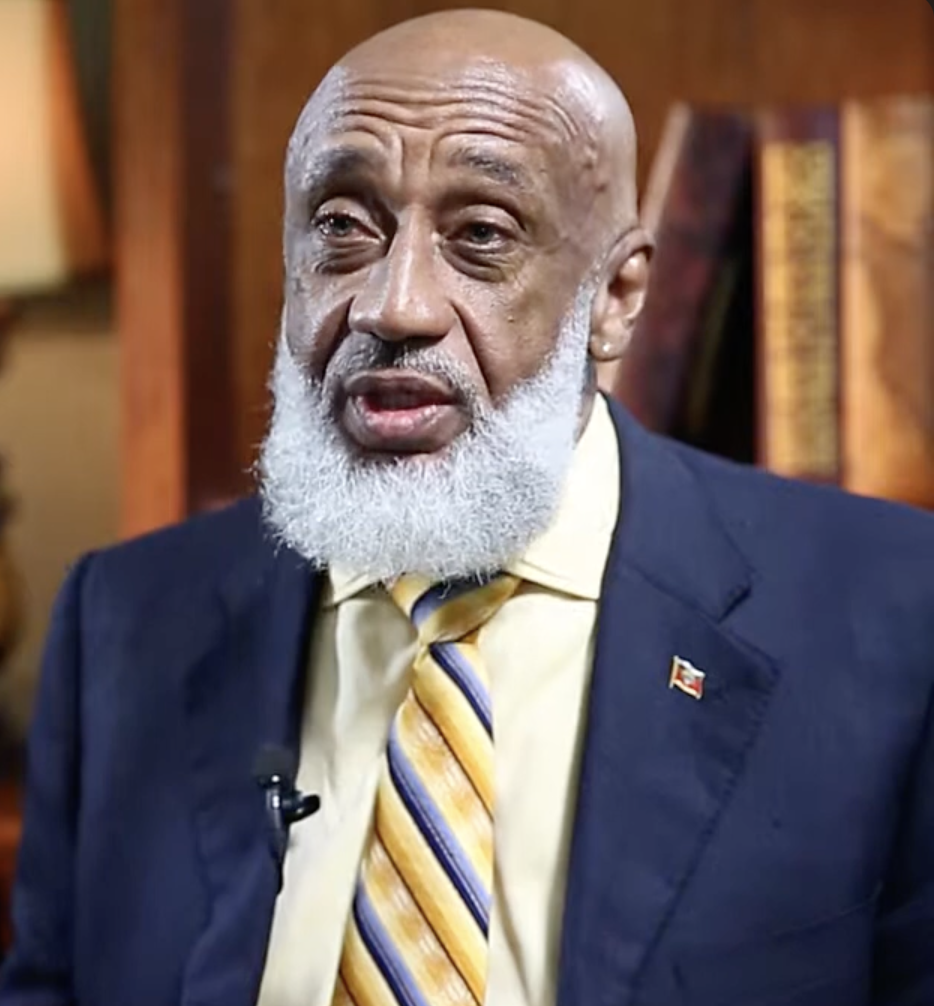

Attorney General of Antigua and Barbuda
- In office 26 March 2004 – 12 June 2014
- Preceded by: Lester Bird
- Succeeded by: Steadroy Benjamin

Personal details
- Born: January 11, 1951 (age 75)
- Party: United Progressive Party

Justin Simon KC (b. 11 January 1951) is a Dominican-Antiguan United Progressive Party politician, who was appointed as the Attorney General of Antigua and Barbuda on 26 March 2004. Justin Simon was also an ex officio member of the House of Representatives.
