= Donald Halstead =

Antiguan politician

Donald Halstead MP

Member of the House of Representatives of Antigua and Barbuda
- In office 11 February 1971 – 5 April 1980
- Preceded by: constituency established
- Succeeded by: George Piggott
- Constituency: St. John's City West
- In office 8 March 1994 – 19 February 1999
- Preceded by: Henderson Simon
- Succeeded by: Gaston Browne
- Constituency: St. John's City West

Personal details
- Party: United Progressive Party; Progressive Labour Movement (former)

Donald Halstead is an Antiguan United Progressive Party politician, who was elected as Member of Parliament for St. John's City West in the 1971, 1976, and 1994 general elections.
