= Eustace Cochrane =

Antiguan politician

Member of the House of Representatives
- In office 17 April 1984 – 18 February 1994
- Preceded by: Constituency established
- Succeeded by: Charlesworth Samuel

Personal details
- Party: Antigua and Barbuda Labour Party

Eustace Cochrane was an Antiguan Labour Party politician, who was first elected as Member of Parliament for All Saints East & St. Luke in the 1984 general election.
