= Newfield, Antigua and Barbuda =

Newfield
- Village
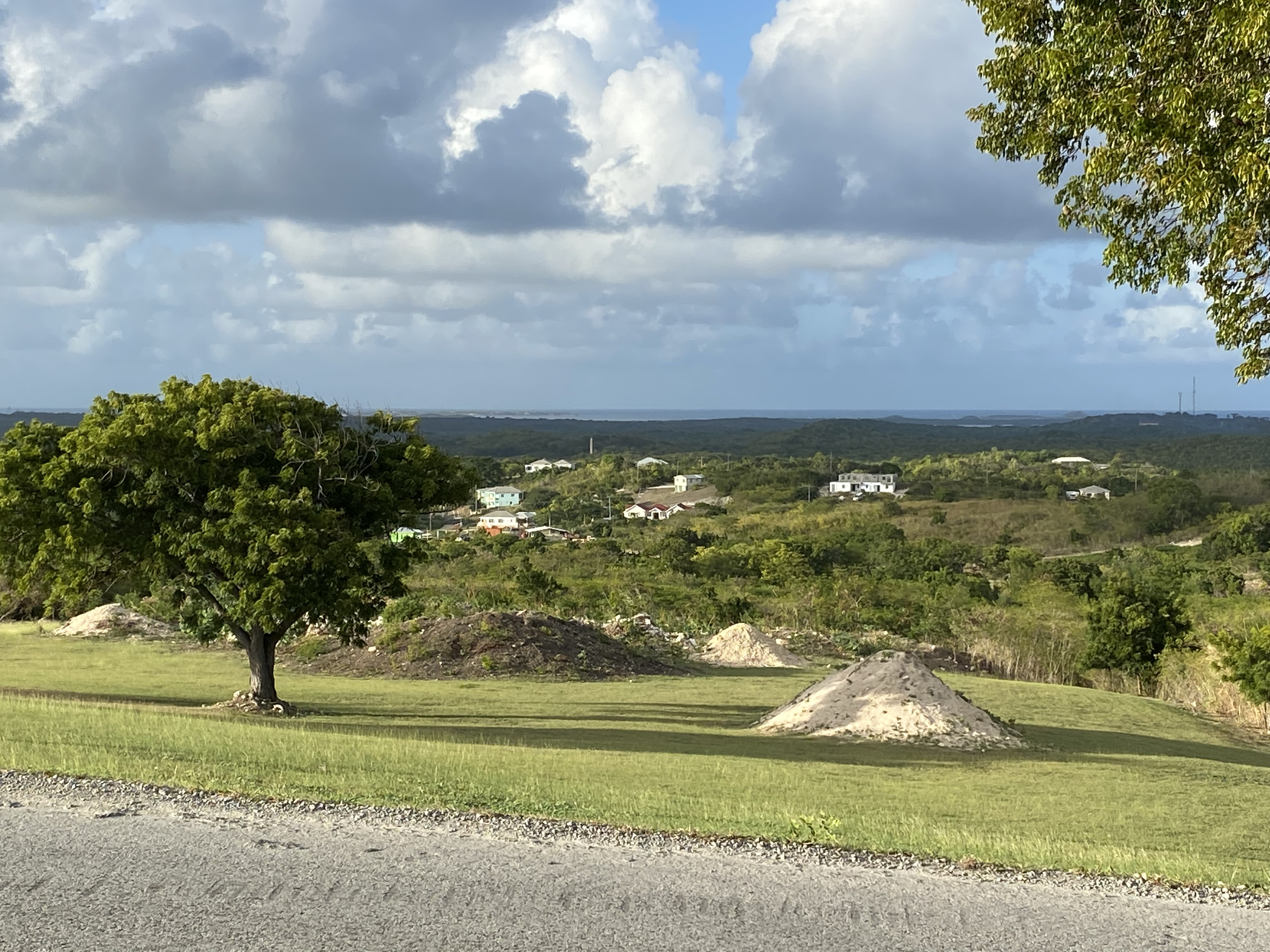
- Newfield in 2021
- Interactive map of the Newfield main place
- Location in Antigua and Barbuda
- Coordinates: 17°03′29″N 61°43′35″W
- Country: Antigua and Barbuda
- Island: Antigua
- Parish: Saint Philip

Government
  - Type: Village Council (possibly dissolved)

Population (2011)
  - Total: 255
- Time zone: UTC-4 (AST)
- Enumeration district: 61300

Newfields is a village in Saint Philip Parish, Antigua and Barbuda.

== Demographics ==
Religion
Q49 Religion	Counts	%
Adventist	102	40.09%
Anglican	42	16.59%
Baptist	4	1.38%
Church of God	1	0.46%
Jehovah Witness	5	1.84%
Methodist	1	0.46%
Moravian	80	31.34%
Pentecostal	7	2.76%
Rastafarian	1	0.46%
Roman Catholic	5	1.84%
Wesleyan Holiness	1	0.46%
Don't know/Not stated	6	2.30%
Total	255	100.00%

Country of birth
Q58. Country of birth	Counts	%
Antigua and Barbuda	223	87.56%
Other Caribbean countries	2	0.92%
Dominica	7	2.76%
Dominican Republic	1	0.46%
Jamaica	4	1.38%
St. Kitts and Nevis	1	0.46%
St. Lucia	5	1.84%
Trinidad and Tobago	1	0.46%
USA	8	3.23%
Not Stated	2	0.92%
Total	255	100.00%

Country of Citizenship
Q71 Country of Citizenship 1	Counts	%
Antigua and Barbuda	245	95.85%
Dominica	5	1.84%
Jamaica	1	0.46%
St. Lucia	1	0.46%
USA	1	0.46%
Not Stated	2	0.92%
Total	255	100.00%

Country of Second Citizenship
Q71 Country of Citizenship 2	Counts	%
Other Caribbean countries	2	11.11%
Canada	1	5.56%
Dominica	5	22.22%
Jamaica	1	5.56%
St. Lucia	4	16.67%
Trinidad and Tobago	1	5.56%
USA	7	33.33%
Total	21	100.00%
Not App:	234	

Ethnic
Q48 Ethnic	Counts	%
African descent	250	98.16%
Mixed (Black/White)	1	0.46%
Mixed (Other)	4	1.38%
Total	255	100.00%
