= Harold Lovell =

Antiguan politician

The Honourable Harold Lovell
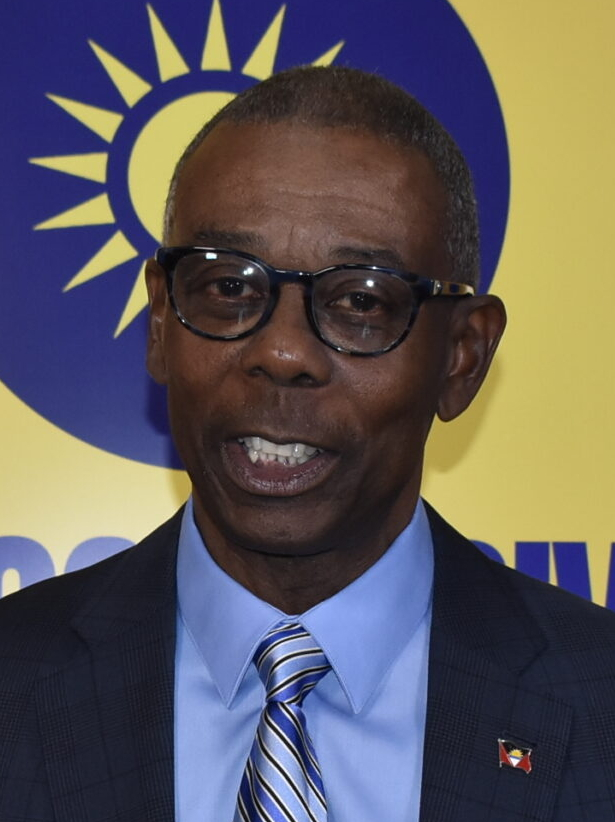

Minister of Foreign Affairs
- In office August 2004 – January 2005
- Prime Minister: Baldwin Spencer
- Preceded by: Lester Bird
- Succeeded by: Baldwin Spencer

Minister of Finance
- In office 2009–2014
- Prime Minister: Baldwin Spencer
- Preceded by: Errol Cort
- Succeeded by: Gaston Browne

Personal details
- Born: 27 September 1955 (age 71) St. John's, Antigua and Barbuda
- Party: United Progressive Party
- Education: University of the West Indies; Thames Valley University; University of Birmingham

Harold Earl Edmund Lovell (born September 27, 1955) is a politician from Antigua and Barbuda. He was the Minister of Finance, the Economy and Public Administration. He was also the minister of tourism and civil aviation. He was the Foreign Minister of Antigua and Barbuda from August 2004 to January 2005, when Prime Minister Baldwin Spencer took over those posts in a cabinet reshuffle, giving Lovell his current posts.

== Early life and education ==
Harold Lovell Jr. was born on September 27, 1955, in St. John's city. He attended the Antigua Grammar School and obtained his tertiary education at the University of the West Indies where he obtained his bachelor's degree in Geography and Geology.

In 1984, he went on to study at the Thames Valley University and Middle Temple, qualifying him as a Barrister-at-Law.

He also holds a Masters of Jurisprudence Degree from the University of Birmingham.

== Career ==
Harold's professional life started at the Antigua Public Utilities Authority. He entered the teaching profession in 1978 with assignments at the Antigua Grammar School and The Antigua State College. In 1979, Lovell was arrested and beaten for participating in a teacher's strike against the government of Vere Bird.

Harold Lovell was Vice President of the Guild of Undergraduates at the University of the West Indies, General Secretary and then Vice Chairman of the Antigua Caribbean Liberation Movement, General Secretary of the Antigua and Barbuda Union of Teachers and Vice Chairman of the United Progressive Party (UPP). While in England he served on the British Broadcasting Corporation (BBC) Advisory Council for Leicestershire, England, between 1990 and 1992. After being successful in the 2009 general elections Lovell became the new Minister of Finance and the Economy.

After three consecutive election defeats (he lost the St. John’s City East seat three times, in 2014, 2018 and 2023), Harold Lovell resigned as leader of the United Progressive Party on January 20, 2023.

== See also ==
- List of foreign ministers in 2004
- List of foreign ministers in 2005

Political offices
Preceded by Lester Bird	Foreign Minister of Antigua and Barbuda; March 2004 – January 2005	Succeeded by Baldwin Spencer
Preceded by Errol Cort	Finance Minister of Antigua and Barbuda; 2009 – 2014	Succeeded by Gaston Browne
