= Anthony Stuart (politician) =

Antiguan politician

Member of the Senate of Antigua and Barbuda
- In office 12 March 2009 – 1 October 2015; Government senator (opposition after 24 June 2014)

Personal details
- Party: United Progressive Party

Anthony Stuart is a United Progressive Party politician, who was appointed to the Senate of Antigua and Barbuda for the government on 12 March 2009.
