= Henderson Simon =

Antiguan politician

Member of the House of Representatives
- In office 17 April 1984 – 18 February 1994
- Preceded by: George Piggott
- Succeeded by: Donald Halstead

Personal details
- Party: Antigua and Barbuda Labour Party

Henderson Simon was an Antiguan Labour Party politician, who was first elected as Member of Parliament for St. John's City West in the 1984 general election.
