= St. John's City West =

Constituency of Antigua and Barbuda

Coordinates: 17°7′54″N 61°50′54″W

- Parliamentary constituency for the Parliament of Antigua and Barbuda
- Parish: Saint John
- Polling divisions: 9
- Electorate: 3,142 (2026)

Current constituency
- Seats: 1
- Party: ABLP
- Member: Gaston Browne

St. John's City West is a parliamentary constituency located in the city of St. John's, Antigua and Barbuda.

The constituency is currently represented by Prime Minister Gaston Browne in the Antiguan House of Representatives.

There are nine polling districts, and the counting centre is Villa Primary School.

== List of representatives ==
List of representatives
Election	Winner	Party	% of votes	Turnout
1971	Donald Halstead	PLM	73.56%	40.98%
1976	Donald Halstead	PLM	67.75%	91.44%
1980	George Pigott	PLM	56.42%	71.23%
1984	Henderson Simon	ABLP	51.47%	56.13%
1989	Henderson Simon	ABLP	56.31%	55.20%
1994	Donald Halstead	UPP	60.75%	58.87%
1999	Gaston Browne	ABLP	48.64%	56.78%
2004	Gaston Browne	ABLP	51.76%	93.90%
2009	Gaston Browne	ABLP	54.97%	82.37%
2014	Gaston Browne	ABLP	65.57%	91.26%
2018	Gaston Browne	ABLP	71.53%	-
2023	Gaston Browne	ABLP	66.47%	63.81%
2026	Gaston Browne	ABLP	77.80%	59.71%
