= Sylvia O'Mard =

Antiguan politician

Member of the Senate of Antigua and Barbuda
- In office 12 March 2009 – 26 April 2014; Governor-General's senator

Personal details
- Party: Independent

Sylvia O'Mard is an independent politician, who was appointed to the Senate of Antigua and Barbuda for the governor-general on 12 March 2009.
