= Randolph Beazer =

Barbudan politician

Randolph Ardel Beazer

8th Chairperson of the Barbuda Council
- In office 19 January 2006 – 9 January 2008
- Preceded by: Lincoln Burton
- Succeeded by: Fabian Jones

Member of the Senate of Antigua and Barbuda
- In office 12 March 2009 – 26 April 2014; Barbuda Council senator Government senator
- Preceded by: Atkinson Beazer
- Succeeded by: Shenique Fortune

Personal details
- Party: Barbuda People's Movement
- Occupation: Painter

Randolph Ardel Beazer is a Barbudan politician, former senator, and painter. He was elected to the Barbuda Council in 2005 and served as its chairman from 19 January 2006 to 9 January 2008.
