= Elmore Charles =

Antigua and Barbuda politician

Member of the Senate of Antigua and Barbuda
- In office 23 March 2004 – 26 April 2014; Government senator

Personal details
- Party: United Progressive Party

Elmore Charles is a United Progressive Party politician, who was appointed to the Senate of Antigua and Barbuda for the government on 23 March 2004.
