= Reuben Harris =

Antiguan politician (1931–1991)

Finance Minister of Antigua and Barbuda
- In office February 1976 – June 1978
- Preceded by: Sydney Prince
- Succeeded by: John St. Luce

Personal details
- Born: 15 May 1931
- Died: 23 May 1991 (aged 60)
- Party: Antigua and Barbuda Labour Party

Reuben Harris (15 May 1931 – 23 May 1991) was an Antiguan politician and minister in the Government of Antigua and Barbuda.

Harris was born 15 May 1931. He had an economics degree from University of the West Indies. He was general secretary of Antigua Union of Teachers.

Harris was a member of House of Representatives of Antigua and Barbuda from 1968 to 1987 or later. He was Finance Minister from February 1976 to June 1978. He was then appointed as the Minister of Education from 1978 until 1987 or later.

Harris died on 23 May 1991 at the age of 60. He was married to Bridget Harris, former Speaker of the House of Representatives of Antigua and Barbuda.
