= Hugh Marshall (politician) =

Antiguan politician

Hugh Marshall MP

Member of the House of Representatives of Antigua and Barbuda
- In office 24 April 1980 – 18 February 1994
- Preceded by: Victor McKay
- Succeeded by: Hilson Baptiste
- Constituency: St. Mary's South

Personal details
- Born: May 24, 1937 (age 89)
- Party: Antigua and Barbuda Labour Party

Hugh Marshall (born 24 May 1937) is an Antiguan Labour Party politician, who was first elected as Member of Parliament for St. Mary's South in the 1980 general election. He grew up in Ebenezer and is the father of Samantha Marshall. He and his family were involved in the restoration of the estate house at Weirs.
