= Christopher O'Mard =

Antiguan politician

Member of the House of Representatives
- In office 18 February 1976 – 18 February 1994
- Preceded by: Sydney Christian
- Succeeded by: Steadroy Benjamin

Personal details
- Party: Antigua and Barbuda Labour Party

Christopher O'Mard was an Antiguan Labour Party politician, who was first elected as Member of Parliament for St. John's City South in the 1976 general election.
