= Attorney-General of Antigua and Barbuda =

Attorney-general of Antigua and Barbuda
- Incumbent; Steadroy Benjamin
- Member of: Cabinet; National Security Council

Appointed by the Governor-General, the Attorney-General of Antigua and Barbuda serves as the primary legal advisor to the Government of Antigua and Barbuda.

== Background ==
A person must be a citizen of Antigua and Barbuda with the right to practice law in order to be eligible to hold or perform duties in the office of Attorney General. The Attorney-General shall be a Minister by virtue of holding the office of Attorney-General, and the provisions of subsections (3) to (6) of section 69 of the Constitution of Antigua and Barbuda shall apply to the office of Attorney-General if he is an elected member of the House at the time of his appointment or later becomes such a member. If the Attorney General is a member of the House by virtue of his position in the House, the Governor General may designate him as a Minister. An Attorney-General designated as a Minister under the previous subsection shall resign both from his position as Attorney-General and from his position as Minister. If the Attorney-General is not a Minister, he will resign from office if the Governor-General revokes his appointment or he loses his citizenship. The Governor-General may designate a suitably qualified individual to fill the Attorney-General position in the event that it becomes vacant or the current occupant is unable to carry out their duties for any reason. However, the provisions of subsections (3) and (4) of section 82 of the constitution will not apply to the individual in this situation. When an appointment made under the previous section 82(7) of the constitution is revoked by the Governor-General, it becomes null and void.

== See also ==
- Constitution of Antigua and Barbuda
- Ministry of Legal Affairs, Public Safety, Immigration and Labour
- Law of Barbuda
