= Hilson Baptiste =

Antiguan politician (1947–2025)

Hilson Baptiste MP

Member of the House of Representatives of Antigua and Barbuda
- In office 8 March 1994 – 26 April 2014
- Preceded by: Hugh Marshall
- Succeeded by: Samantha Marshall
- Constituency: St. Mary's South

Personal details
- Born: 14 October 1947
- Died: 23 April 2025 (aged 77) Saint John's, Antigua and Barbuda
- Party: United Progressive Party

Hilson Baptiste (14 October 1947 – 23 April 2025) was an Antiguan United Progressive Party politician, who was elected as Member of Parliament for St. Mary's South in the 1994, 1999, 2004, and 2009 general elections.

== Life and career ==
Baptiste was born on 14 October 1947. In 2009, as Minister of Agriculture and Fisheries, he launched the Seafood Festival to instill a sense of pride and unity within the community while encouraging the public to eat more seafood.

On 18 January 2017, he was found guilty of assaulting a police officer and was ordered to pay him $500.

On 21 August 2023, Baptiste suffered a major stroke causing him aphasia.

Baptiste died in Saint John's, Antigua and Barbuda on 23 April 2025, at the age of 77.
