= John St. Luce =

Antiguan politician

Sir John St. Luce
- In office 1976–2004

Finance Minister of Antigua and Barbuda
- In office 1978–1982
- Prime Minister: Vere Bird
- Preceded by: Reuben Harris
- Succeeded by: Vere Bird

Finance Minister of Antigua and Barbuda
- In office 1982–1991
- Prime Minister: Vere Bird
- Preceded by: Vere Bird
- Succeeded by: Lester Bird

Finance Minister of Antigua and Barbuda
- In office 1994–1994
- Prime Minister: Lester Bird
- Preceded by: Molwyn Joseph
- Succeeded by: Molwyn Joseph

Finance Minister of Antigua and Barbuda
- In office 1996–2001
- Prime Minister: Lester Bird
- Preceded by: Molwyn Joseph
- Succeeded by: Lester Bird

Personal details
- Born: John Eugene St. Luce; 1940 (age 85–86)
- Party: Antigua Labour Party
- Profession: politician

Sir John Eugene St. Luce, KGCN, (born 1940), is an Antiguan politician from the Antigua Labour Party (ALP).

St. Luce was born in 1940. He attended the University of London and majored in economics and social sciences. He worked in Barclays Bank both on Antigua and in London.

In 1971, he was appointed to the Senate. until 1976. In 1976, he was elected to the House of Representatives. He was subsequently re-elected until his retirement from active politics in 2004. He held several portfolios in the Cabinet of Antigua and Barbuda: Minister of Agriculture, Home Affairs, Health, Public Works, Public Utilities and Communications and Finance, and Minister of Information (1991-1994). He lost to Lester Bird when there was a vote for successor of Vere Bird as the chairman of the ALP.

He was knighted and received Order of Merit in 2017.
