= Steadroy Benjamin =

Antigua and Barbuda politician

The Honourable Sir Steadroy "Cutie" Benjamin KGCN
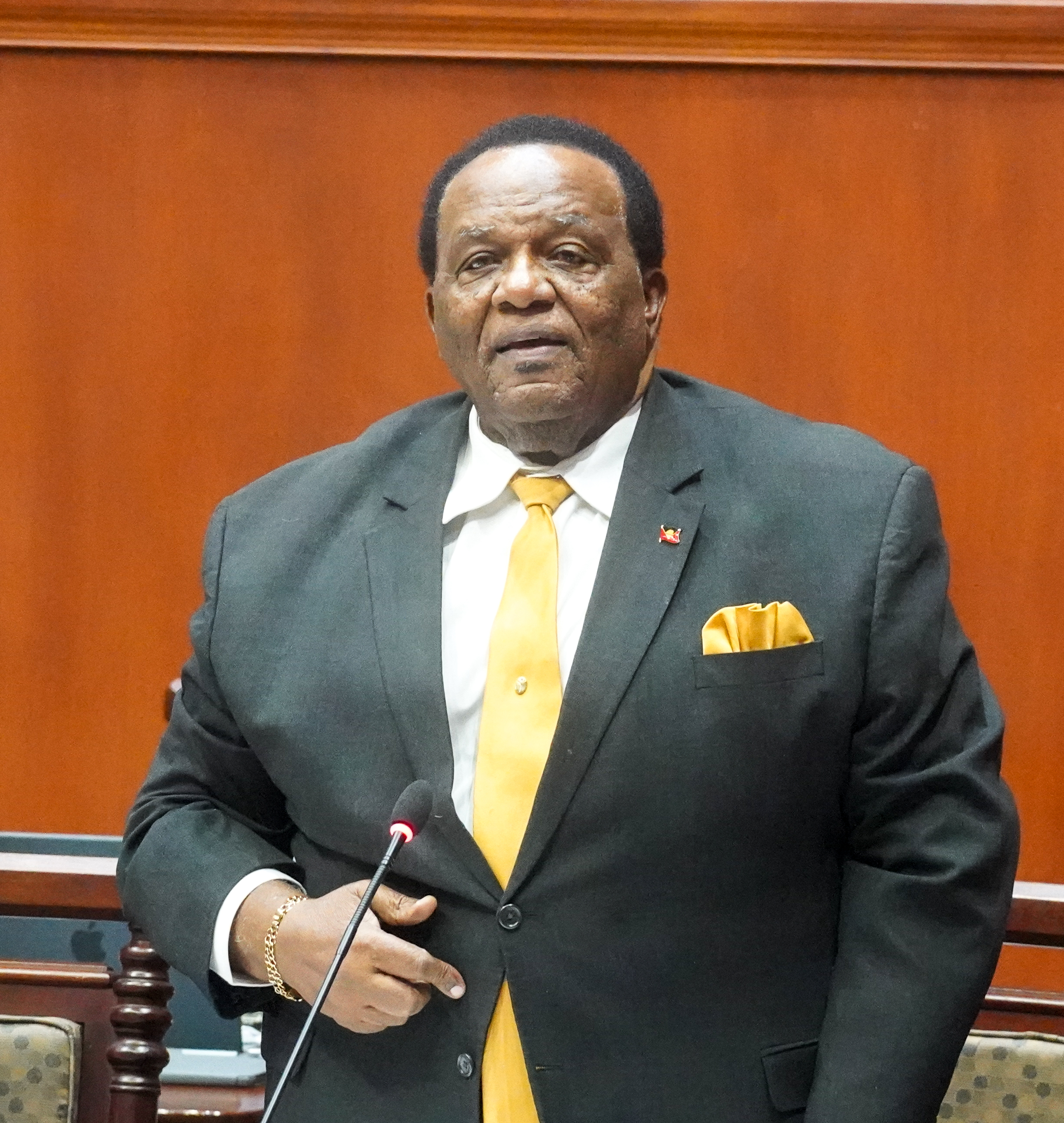

Member of the House of Representatives of Antigua and Barbuda
- Incumbent
- Assumed office 8 March 1994
- Preceded by: Christopher O'Mard
- Constituency: St. John's City South

Attorney General of Antigua and Barbuda
- Incumbent
- Assumed office 13 June 2014
- Preceded by: Justin Simon

Senator in the Senate of Antigua and Barbuda
- In office 24 April 1980 – 8 March 1994

Leader of the Opposition
- In office 5 January 2006 – March 2009
- Preceded by: Robin Yearwood
- Succeeded by: Lester Bird

Personal details
- Party: Antigua Labour Party
- Profession: politician and lawyer

Sir Steadroy "Cutie" Olivero Benjamin, KGCN, is an Antiguan lawyer and politician, who is the current minister of Justice and Attorney General of Antigua and Barbuda. He previously served as Leader of the Opposition in the Parliament of Antigua and Barbuda.

A lawyer by training, Benjamin represented Ivor Bird, the brother of Prime Minister Lester Bird, following his arrest for the attempted smuggling of cocaine.

Benjamin was appointed to the Senate of Antigua and Barbuda in 1981, where he served two terms before being elected to the House of Representatives in 1994. He was then returned as the Member of Parliament for St John's City South, representing Bird's Labour Party, and was re-elected during the 1999 general election with 845 votes, defeating the United Progressive Party candidate Vaughn Walter. He was then sworn in, on 12 March, as Minister of Planning, Implementation and Public Service Affairs. Later that year he was transferred, becoming Minister of Labour, Home Affairs and Co-operatives. In 2001, his position was expanded with the stripping of internal security power from Errol Cort, the Attorney General of Antigua and Barbuda, and the granting of this portfolio to Benjamin.

As Minister for Labour, Benjamin was responsible for introducing the Sir George Walter (Pension and Other Benefits) Act 2002, which sought to grant Sir George Walter, the second Premier of Antigua and Barbuda, and father of the aforementioned Vaughn Walter, a pension of 10,000 East Caribbean dollars a month, and announced that non-Antiguans who lived in Antigua for three years or more would not be required to obtain permits to work. Following the 2004 general election, Benjamin was one of only four Labour Party MPs to keep his seat, and was sworn into the new Parliament on 29 March 2004. Although initially supporting Robin Yearwood as Leader of the Opposition, Benjamin later withdrew his support, as did two other Labour MPs, Gaston Browne and Asot Michael; the group suggested Benjamin as a replacement leader. Benjamin was later appointed Leader of the Opposition, overseeing the removal of Lennox Weston from the Senate, and was later appointed Shadow Minister for justice, legal affairs, the Attorney-General's office and crime.

Benjamin was elected again to the House of Representatives in the 2023 general elections for the St John's City South Constituency and confirmed as Minister of Legal Affairs, Public Safety, Immigration and Labour in the Government of the Prime Minister Gaston Browne.

He was presented the Most Distinguished Order of the Nation at the independence celebration on 1 November 2023.

== See also ==
- Gaston Browne
- E.P. Chet Greene
