= Gaston Browne =

Prime Minister of Antigua and Barbuda since 2014

The Right Honourable Gaston Browne MP
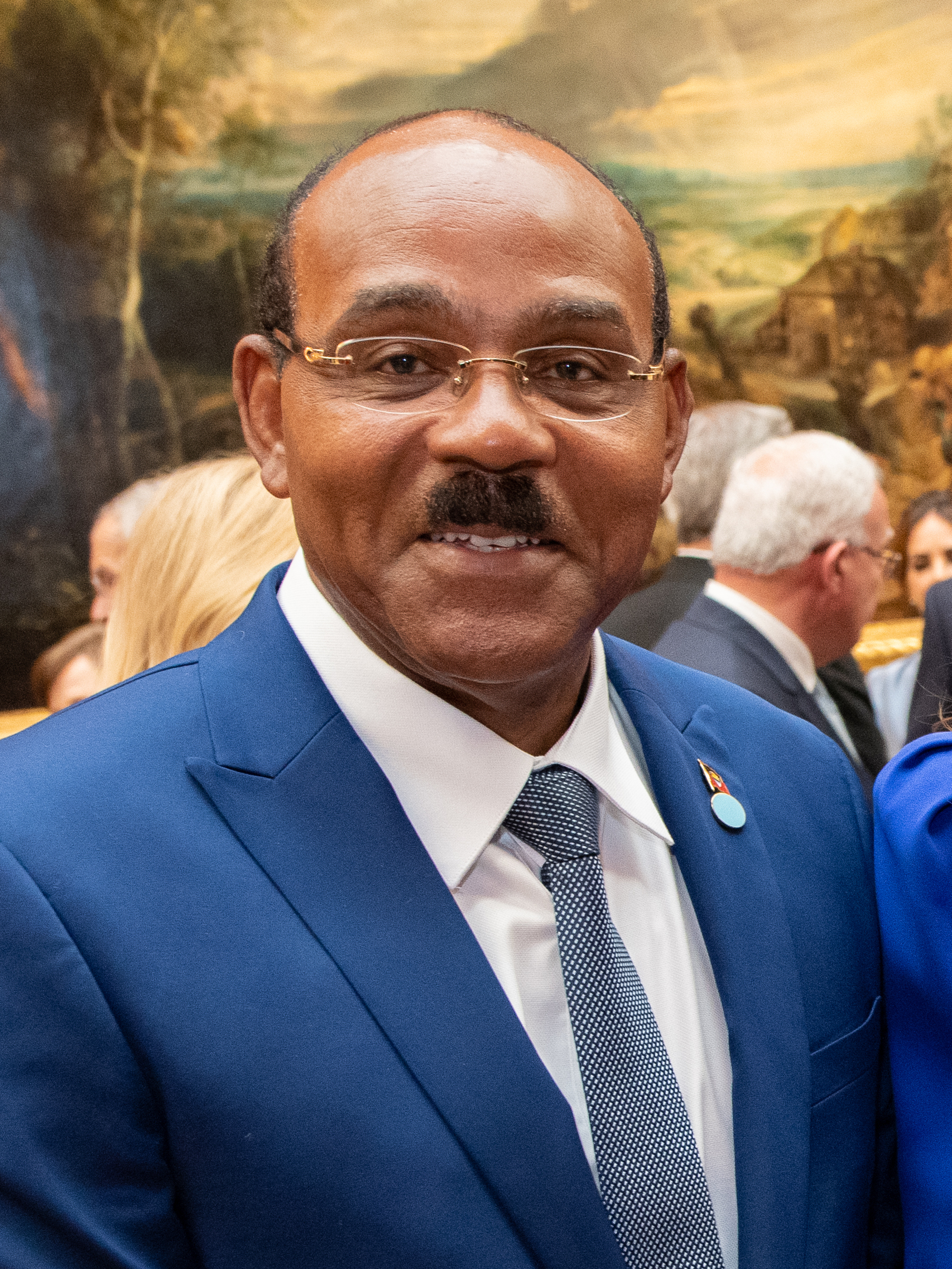
- Browne in 2023

4th Prime Minister of Antigua and Barbuda
- Incumbent
- Assumed office 13 June 2014
- Monarchs: Elizabeth II; Charles III
- Governors-General: Louise Lake-Tack; Rodney Williams
- Preceded by: Baldwin Spencer

Chairman of the Caribbean Community
- In office 1 January 2021 – 30 June 2021
- Secretary-General: Irwin LaRocque; Carla Barnett
- Preceded by: Keith Rowley
- Succeeded by: Johnny Briceño
- In office 1 July 2014 – 31 December 2014
- Secretary-General: Irwin LaRocque
- Preceded by: Ralph Gonsalves
- Succeeded by: Perry Christie

Leader of the Labour Party
- Incumbent
- Assumed office 25 November 2012
- Preceded by: Lester Bird

Leader of the Opposition
- In office 5 December 2012 – 13 June 2014
- Prime Minister: Baldwin Spencer
- Preceded by: Lester Bird
- Succeeded by: Baldwin Spencer

Member of Parliament for St. John's City West
- Incumbent
- Assumed office 9 March 1999
- Preceded by: Donald Halstead

19th Commonwealth Chair-in-Office
- Incumbent
- Assumed office 1 November 2026
- Preceded by: Laʻauli Leuatea Schmidt

Personal details
- Born: Gaston Alfonso Browne; 9 February 1967 (age 59) Villa, Colony of Antigua
- Party: Labour
- Spouse: Maria Bird (m. 2013)
- Children: 5
- Education: City Banking College; University of Manchester

Gaston Alphonso Browne (born 9 February 1967) is an Antiguan politician serving as the prime minister of Antigua and Barbuda and leader of the Labour Party since 2014. Before entering politics, he was a banker and businessman.

== Early life ==
Browne was born on 9 February 1967, in the Villa area of St. John's. As a child, he lived in Point with his paternal great-grandmother, who was in her eighties at the time, partially blind, poor, and aging.

== Education ==
After completing his secondary education, Browne attended the City Banking College in the United Kingdom, where he graduated with a BSc in banking and finance. Later, he attended the University of Manchester, acquiring an MBA in Finance.

On 4 October 2025, Browne announced he would be pursuing a PhD at the University of the West Indies starting January 2026. While he did not specify his field of study, Browne described the decision as part of his personal commitment to lifelong learning and academic excellence.

== Career ==
Following graduation, Browne secured a position with the Swiss American Banking Group, a major banking consortium in Antigua and Barbuda that consists of offshore and onshore banks and a trust company. He eventually advanced to the position of commercial banking manager.

He entered politics in 1999, being elected to parliament for the constituency of St. John's City West. In his first term, he was appointed minister of planning, trade, industry, commerce, and public service affairs.

Browne challenged and defeated Lester Bird in the leadership race for Labour Party in November 2012 with a margin of 213 to 180 and was appointed as leader of the opposition in December 2012.

== Prime minister ==
Gaston Browne led the Antigua and Barbuda Labour Party to victory in the 2014 Antiguan general election, winning 14 out of 17 seats. Browne was sworn in as prime minister on 13 June 2014. He defeated Baldwin Spencer's United Progressive Party (UPP), which had ruled for 10 years. Browne also held the office of Minister of Finance.

On 21 March 2018 general election, he successfully led his party to its second consecutive electoral victory. He was sworn in for a second term as prime minister on 22 March 2018. In the general election of 18 January 2023, he won his third term in office—a unique achievement in the history of Antigua and Barbuda—but this time with a slim majority of nine seats against the eight allocated to the opposition. On 15 July 2024, MP Anthony Smith resigned as a member of the UPP, becoming an independent parliamentarian but effectively moving into the ranks of the majority, strengthening Browne's leadership. The following day, he was sworn in before Governor-General Rodney Williams as the new minister of agriculture, lands, fisheries, and the blue economy, becoming the first independent MP in Antigua and Barbuda's history to receive a cabinet position. On 14 January 2025, ABLP candidate Rawdon Turner emerged victorious in St. Peter by-election, called following the death of independent MP Asot Michael, fortifying the governing majority even more. Turner is sworn in as minister of social and urban transformation on 15 January 2025.

The Caribbean Global Awards ranked Gaston Browne 9th on the Caribbean Leaders' top 10 list for the year 2024.

In April 2026, Browne got reelected in a general election, winning his fourth term. Browne and the attorney general, Steadroy Benjamin, were sworn in on 1 May. However, due to an incorrect oath being administered after a recent legal amendment, the two had to be sworn in a second time on 2 May.

=== Aftermath of Hurricane Irma ===
On 6 September 2017 Hurricane Irma swept through Barbuda. Gaston Browne stated that the Category 5 storm had destroyed 95% of the structures and vehicles. Initial estimates showed that at least 60% of the island's residents were homeless because of the disaster. All communications with Barbuda were completely down for a time; most of the communications system had been destroyed.

On 8 September 2017, Browne said, "Barbuda right now is literally a rubble" with no water or phone service; he said there had been only a single fatality. The government had almost completed the evacuation of the entire island; nearly 1,800 people were transferred to Antigua.

On the same day, the first of three cargo planes arrived from the US, with over 120,000 pounds of relief for Barbuda, paid for by the Government of Antigua and Barbuda and by donations from Martin Franklyn and the Coleman Company in the US. Also on 8 September, Browne discussed Barbuda's urgent needs with Administrator Mark Green of the United States Agency for International Development. USAID had already sent a disaster assistance response team and continued to coordinate with the government and relief organizations.

Browne's government was facing a massive challenge. An estimate published by Time indicated that over US$100 million would be required to rebuild homes and infrastructure. Director of Antigua and Barbuda's National Office of Disaster Services, Philmore Mullin, said, "All critical infrastructure and utilities are non-existent—food supply, medicine, shelter, electricity, water, communications, and waste management," adding, "Public utilities need to be rebuilt in their entirety ... It is optimistic to think anything can be rebuilt in six months ... In my 25 years in disaster management, I have never seen something like this."

=== Republicanism ===
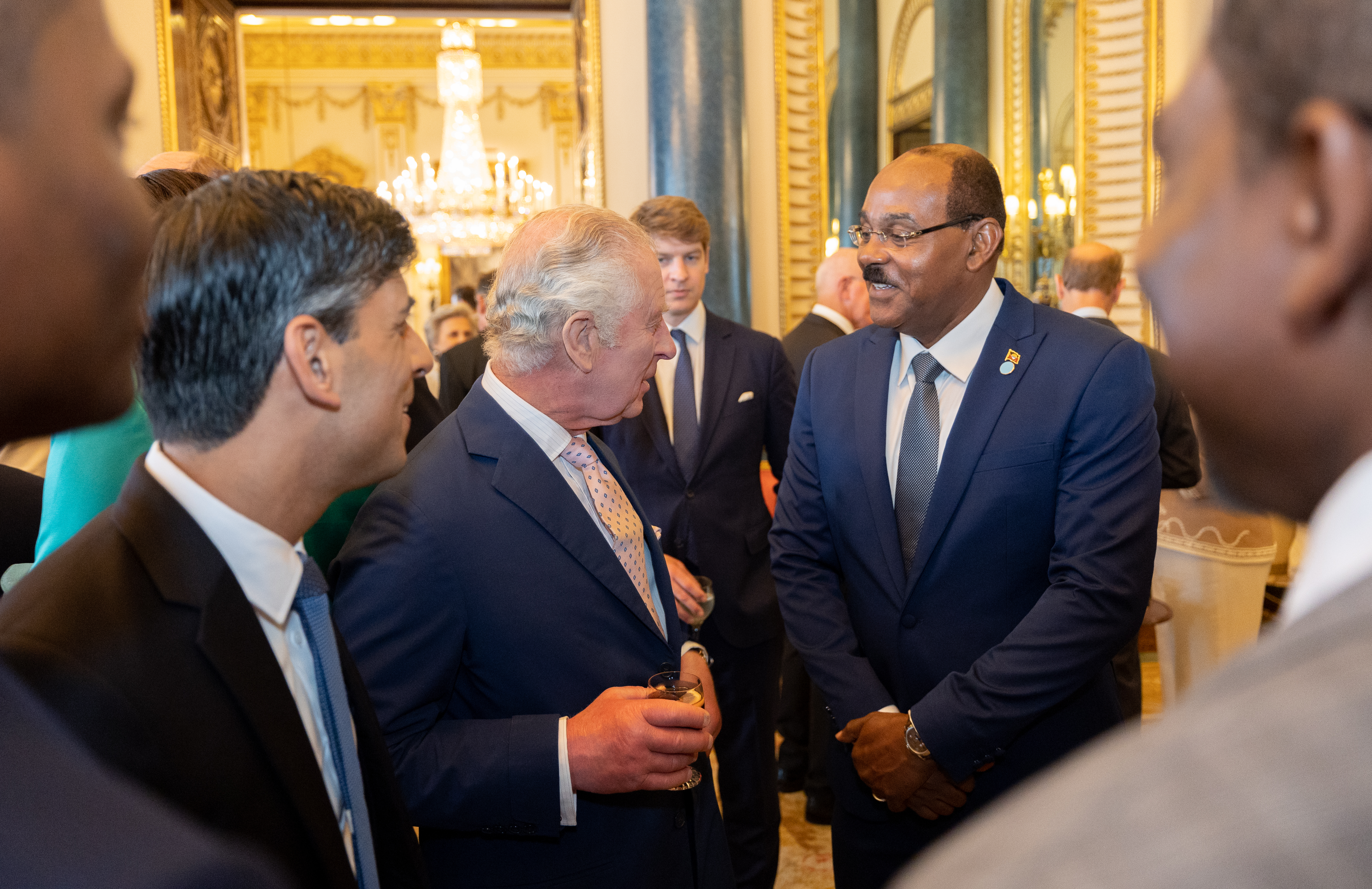
Browne with King Charles III and Rishi Sunak at Buckingham Palace, in 2023

During a visit by the Earl and Countess of Wessex for the celebration of Queen Elizabeth II's Platinum Jubilee, Browne asked the Earl if the couple would use their diplomatic influence to support reparations for slavery to Caribbean Community nations and announced his country would become a republic. Following the death of the Queen, Browne has said he would call for a referendum on the country becoming a republic within three years. Browne says, "This is not an act of hostility or any difference between Antigua and Barbuda and the monarchy, but it is the final step to complete that circle of independence, to ensure that we are truly a sovereign nation." He added the country would remain a member of the Commonwealth regardless of the outcome.

=== Foreign policy ===
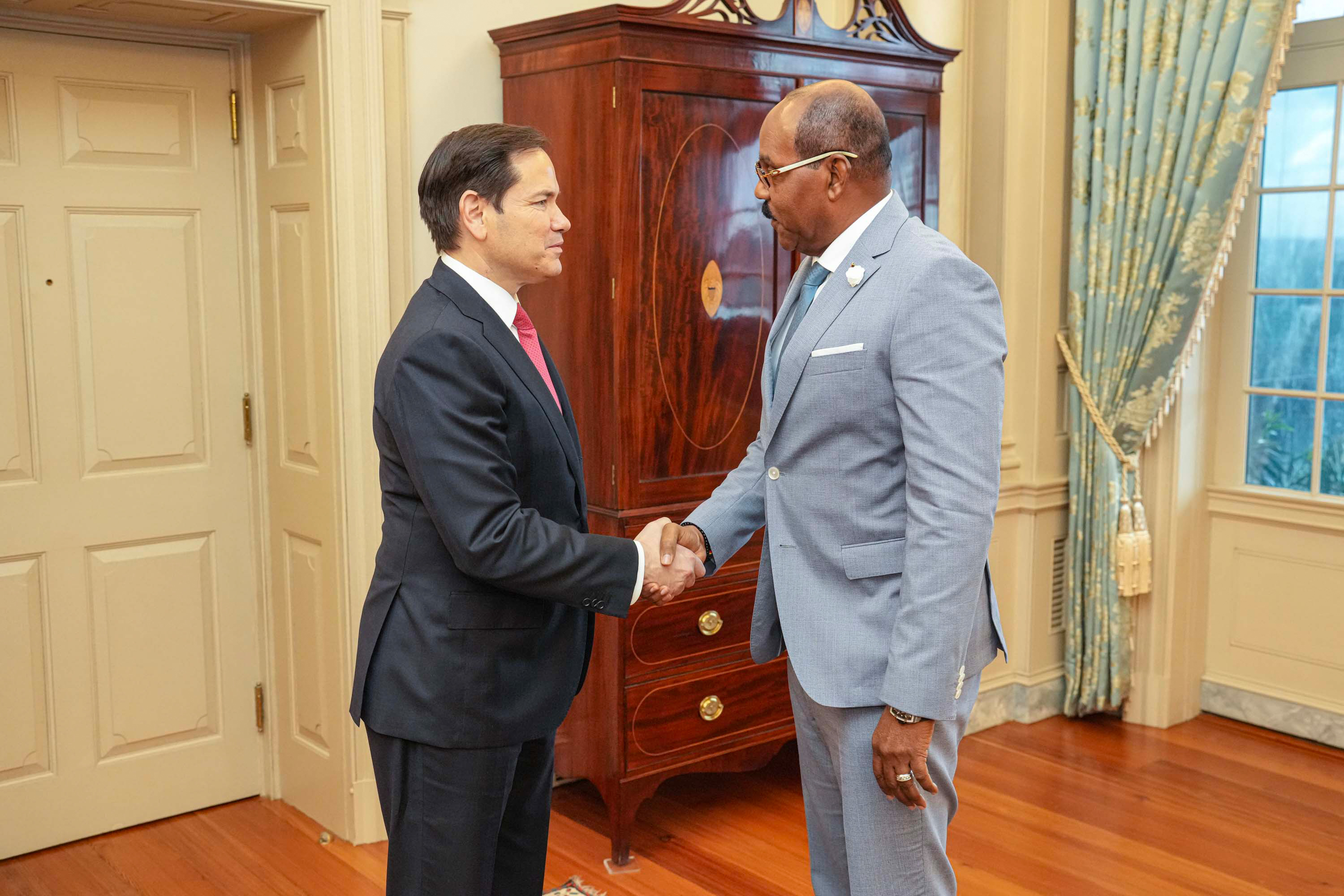
Browne with United States secretary of state Marco Rubio, in 2025

According to Browne, the United States is "the most important country" to the Caribbean in terms of tourism and trade, and Beijing provides aid to the Caribbean through grants, concessional loans, and infrastructure projects.

His government sold the yacht of Russian oligarch Andrey Guryev, Alfa Nero. Alfa Nero was seized following the imposition of economic sanctions due to the Russian invasion of Ukraine. Guryev's daughter, Yulia Guryeva-Motlokhov, filed a lawsuit claiming she is the real owner of the yacht. Gaston Browne said the yacht's maintenance was costing taxpayers $28,000 a week.

== Family and personal life ==
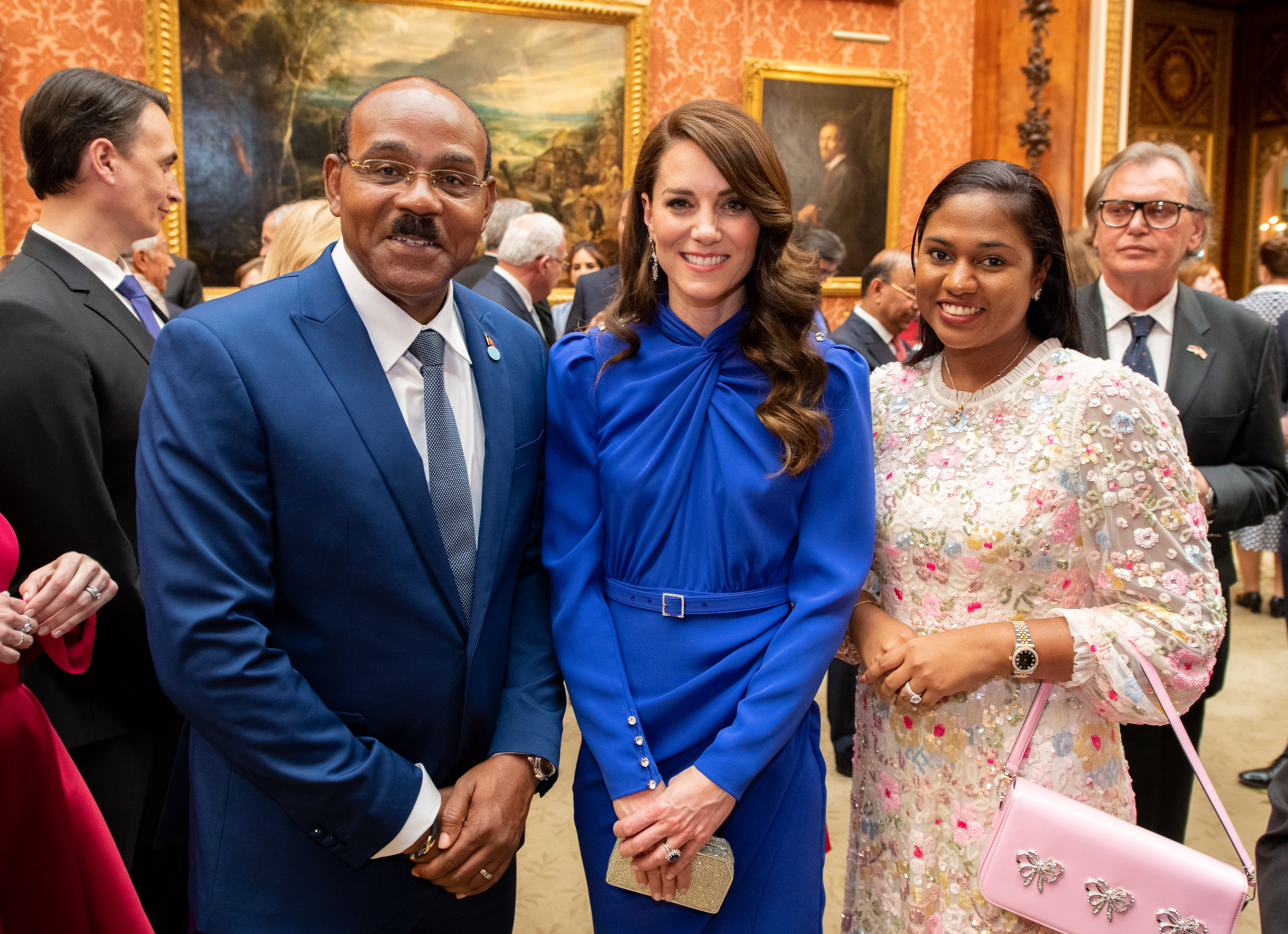
Browne and his wife Maria with Catherine, Princess of Wales at Buckingham Palace, in 2023

Browne is married to Maria Bird-Browne, niece of the second prime minister Lester Bird. He had three children prior to that marriage. The couple have a son, Prince Gaston Browne, and a daughter born in September 2020. In 2023, it was announced that one of Browne's sons was serving as the Vice Minister of State of the Joseon Cybernation as well as the Joseon Ambassador to Antigua and Barbuda. He lives outside of his constituency in Hodges Bay and also owns a villa in Jolly Harbour.

Browne also produces reggae music with the assistance of artificial intelligence, performing under his self-described alter ego, Gassy Dread. Browne is one of the persons on The Browne & Browne Show panel, the flagship program of the Pointe Broadcasting Network which is based in his constituency.

== See also ==
- Ronald Sanders
- Walton Alfonso Webson
- Antigua.news

House of Representatives of Antigua and Barbuda
Preceded by Donald Halstead	Member of Parliament for St. John's City West; 1999–present	Incumbent
Party political offices
Preceded by Lester Bird	Leader of the Antigua and Barbuda Labour Party; 2012–present	Incumbent
Political offices
Preceded by Baldwin Spencer	Prime Minister of Antigua and Barbuda; 2014–present	Incumbent
Preceded by Harold Lovell	Minister of Finance of Antigua and Barbuda; 2014–present	Incumbent
Diplomatic posts
Preceded by Ralph Gonsalves	Chair of the Caribbean Community; 2014	Succeeded by Perry Christie
Preceded by Keith Rowley	Chair of the Caribbean Community; 2021	Succeeded by Johnny Briceño
