= Robin Yearwood =

Antiguan politician

Sir Robin Yearwood

Leader of the Opposition
- In office 24 March 2004 – 5 January 2006
- Preceded by: Baldwin Spencer
- Succeeded by: Steadroy Benjamin

Member of the House of Representatives of Antigua and Barbuda
- In office 18 February 1976 – 18 February 2026
- Preceded by: Donald Sheppard
- Succeeded by: Randy Baltimore
- Constituency: St. Philip's North

Finance Minister of Antigua and Barbuda
- In office 2003–2004
- Preceded by: Lester Bird
- Succeeded by: Errol Cort

Deputy Prime Minister of Antigua and Barbuda
- In office 9 September 2002 – March 2004
- Succeeded by: Willmoth Daniel

Minister of Aviation, Public Information and Public Utilities
- In office 1 January 1987 – 2004
- Preceded by: Vere Bird, Jr.

Minister of Agriculture, Land and Fisheries
- In office 29 May 1980 – 1 January 1987

Personal details
- Born: 1 September 1944 (age 82)
- Party: Antigua Labour Party
- Spouse: Christiana Yearwood (m. 1981; div. 2008)
- Profession: politician

Sir Robin Yearwood KGCN (b. 1 September 1944) is an Antiguan politician and member of the Antigua Labour Party (ALP). Entering Parliament in 1976, Yearwood served as Minister of Agriculture, Land and Fisheries in the ALP administration until a cabinet reshuffle in 1987 saw him take over Vere Bird, Jr.'s portfolio for Aviation, Public Information and Public Utilities. Despite a failed attempt to oust the Prime Minister he retained this position, and kept it when he became Deputy Prime Minister on 9 September 2002 and Minister of Finance a year later. Following the ALP's loss in the 2004 election, Yearwood was one of only three ALP members left in the lower house, and became Leader of the Opposition. He held this position until 2006, when he was replaced with Steadroy Benjamin.

Until February 2026, Yearwood was the longest serving legislator in the Caribbean and the Commonwealth. On 18 February 2026, he celebrated his fiftieth anniversary of parliamentary service at a special sitting in his honour. He resigned at the end of the sitting.

== Early career ==
Robin Kensworth Montgomery Yearwood was born on 1 September 1944. He was first elected to Parliament in 1976, for the seat of St. Philip's North. He entered Cabinet-level politics on 29 May 1980, when he was appointed Minister of Agriculture, Land and Fisheries in the ALP government of Vere Bird. He retained this position after the 1984 election, and in 1986 led the construction of a new agricultural research laboratory, using equipment donated by China under a 1983 economic and technical cooperation pact. A cabinet reshuffle on 1 January 1987 saw Yearwood replace Vere Bird, Jr., the Prime Minister's son, as Minister of Aviation, Public Information and Public Utilities, ceding his Agriculture portfolio to Hilroy Humphreys. This followed controversy over Bird's construction of a new airport, which the opposition charged was "grossly inflated" in cost; retired Grenadian judge Sir Archibald Nedd was appointed to investigate the project and look for signs of wrongdoing. This scandal threatened to topple the government, with eight ministers, including the Deputy Prime Minister, arguing that Vere Bird should have his son fired.

Retaining his seat in the 1989 election, seeing off a challenge from Junie de Shalto, he remained Minister of Aviation. Following the 1991 budget proposal, described by members of the opposition as "illegal and unconstitutional", Yearwood was one of seven ALP Ministers to call for the Prime Minister's resignation; despite the failure of this campaign, he retained his position in the Cabinet. As Aviation Minister, Yearwood spearheaded a $2.8 million grant to LIATairline in an attempt to boost its recovery: a $1.4 million bank overdraft and a $1.4 million government loan.

== Deputy Prime Minister and Leader of the Opposition ==
On 9 September 2002, Yearwood was appointed Deputy Prime Minister of Antigua and Barbuda by Lester Bird in a reorganisation of the government aimed at tackling a series of corruption scandals; he retained his Aviation, Public Information and Public Utilities portfolio. He announced that his focus would be on rebuilding Antigua's economy, switching from a reliance on the failing banana industry to a focus on tourism. Following the resignation of five government members in protest at Bird's leadership, Bird he announced he was reshuffling the Cabinet, and handed Yearwood the position of Minister of Finance. As Minister of Finance, Yearwood attended the 2003 International Monetary Fund conference as the Antiguan delegate, and also met the Inter-American Economic Council's delegation when it visited Antigua in January 2004.

The ALP lost their majority in the 2004 general election, and the United Progressive Party (UPP) under Baldwin Spencer took 14 of the 17 seats in Parliament. Yearwood, as one of the few remaining ALP Parliamentarians, became Leader of the Opposition. Appointed Chairman of the Public Accounts Committee, Yearwood strongly criticised the UPP budget, which was later approved. In 2005 he, Lester Bird and Hugh Marshall, Sr. were charged with an illegal land sale while in government, with the UPP administration alleging that government property had been sold to a company owned by the three at below-market value. In 2006, following a letter from three ALP Parliamentarians accusing him of "fuelling division within the party", Yearwood was removed as Leader of the Opposition and replaced by Steadroy Benjamin. Despite this fall from grace he remains in Parliament, seeing off a challenge from Elmore Charles to retain his seat in the 2009 election.

== Later career ==
Yearwood was narrowly elected again to the House of Representatives in the 2023 general elections for the St. Philip's North constituency. In January 2026, ahead of his fiftieth anniversary of parliamentary service, various roads in eastern Antigua were merged and renamed to the Sir Robin Yearwood Highway. On 18 February 2026, his fiftieth anniversary in parliament was celebrated at a sitting of the House of Representatives dedicated to him. He resigned later that sitting. His successor, Randy Baltimore, was elected in the St. Philip's North by-election that March.
