= Baldwin Spencer =

Prime Minister of Antigua and Barbuda from 2004 to 2014

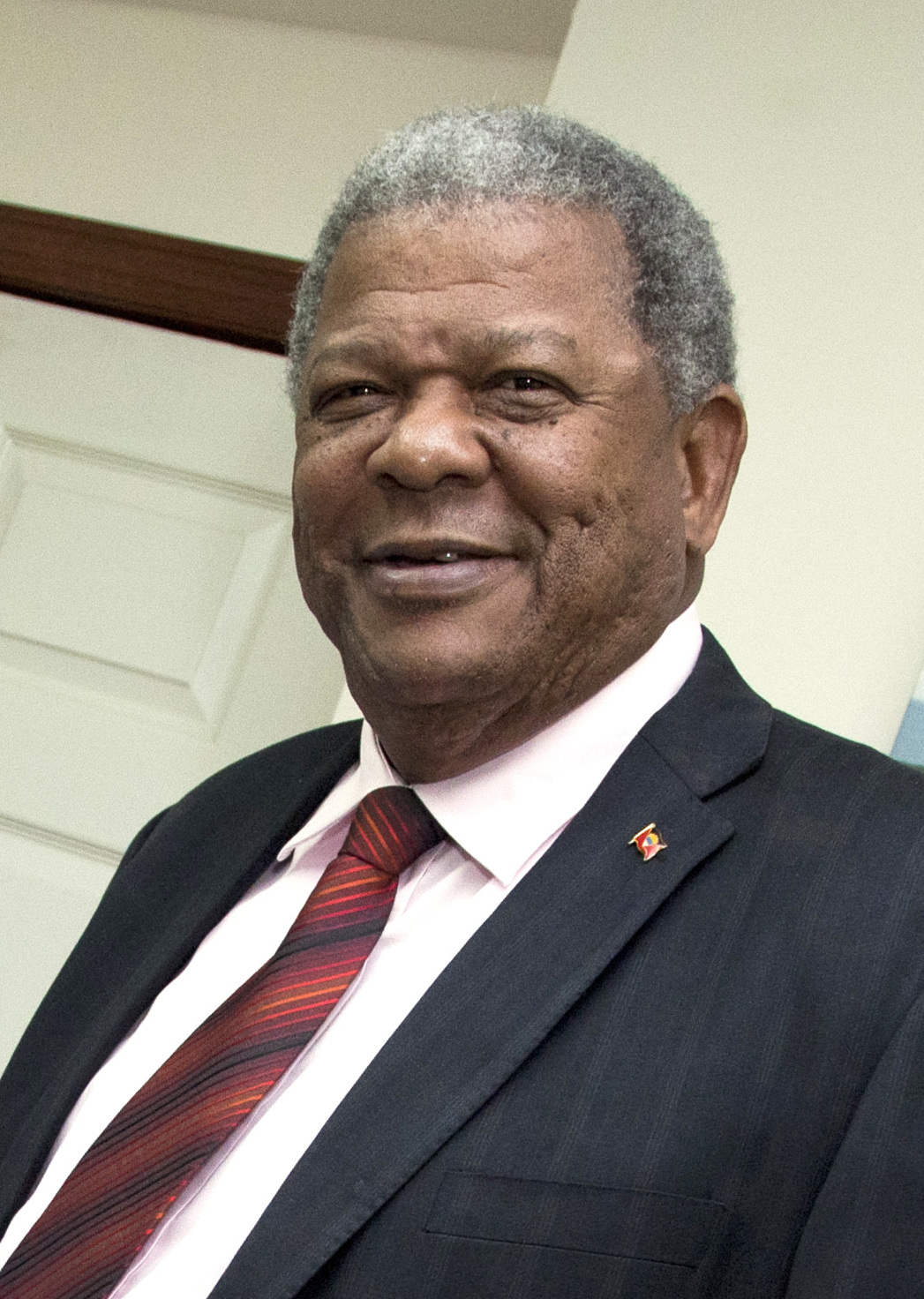

3rd Prime Minister of Antigua and Barbuda
- In office 24 March 2004 – 13 June 2014
- Monarch: Elizabeth II
- Governors-General: James Carlisle; Louise Lake-Tack
- Preceded by: Lester Bird
- Succeeded by: Gaston Browne

Minister of Foreign Affairs
- In office 6 January 2005 – 13 June 2014
- Preceded by: Harold Lovell
- Succeeded by: Charles Fernandez

Leader of the Opposition
- In office June 2014 – March 2018
- Preceded by: Gaston Browne
- Succeeded by: Jamale Pringle
- In office 1989–2004
- Preceded by: Eric Burton
- Succeeded by: Robin Yearwood

Personal details
- Born: Winston Baldwin Spencer; 8 October 1948 (age 77) Greenbay, St. John's, Presidency of Antigua
- Party: United Progressive Party
- Spouse: Jacklyn Spencer
- Children: 2

Winston Baldwin Spencer (born 8 October 1948) is an Antiguan politician who was the third prime minister of Antigua and Barbuda from 2004 to 2014.

Spencer led the opposition United Progressive Party (UPP) to victory in the March 2004 parliamentary election. In addition to serving as prime minister, he became minister of foreign affairs on 6 January 2005.

Spencer's party was swept from power in the June 2014 general election.

== Political career ==
=== Leader of the Opposition ===
For a quarter-century, Baldwin Spencer was a prominent labour leader with the Antigua and Barbuda Workers Union. In 1986 he was elected as deputy leader of United National Democratic Party. He was first elected to Parliament in 1989 as the MP for the St. John's Rural West constituency.

In 1992, Spencer played an integral role in the formation of the United Progressive Party. He previously served as a leader with the United National Democratic Party and spearheaded collaborative meetings with the Antigua Caribbean Liberation Movement that resulted in the formation of the United Progressive Party. Upon formation of the party, Spencer rose to become the political leader of the party and the Opposition Leader in the Parliament.

As Opposition Leader Baldwin Spencer organized public demonstrations and went on a hunger strike to advocate for electoral reform after the widely criticized 1999 elections. His advocacy led to the formation of an independent Electoral Commission to oversee elections in Antigua and Barbuda. He also led the fight to ensure that opposition had access to state-owned media, such as the television station, Antigua Broadcasting Service (ABS). To that end, he filed a writ and took the Bird Government to court arguing that, in a democratic society, citizens have a right to hear an opposing political perspective on government airwaves.

=== Prime minister ===
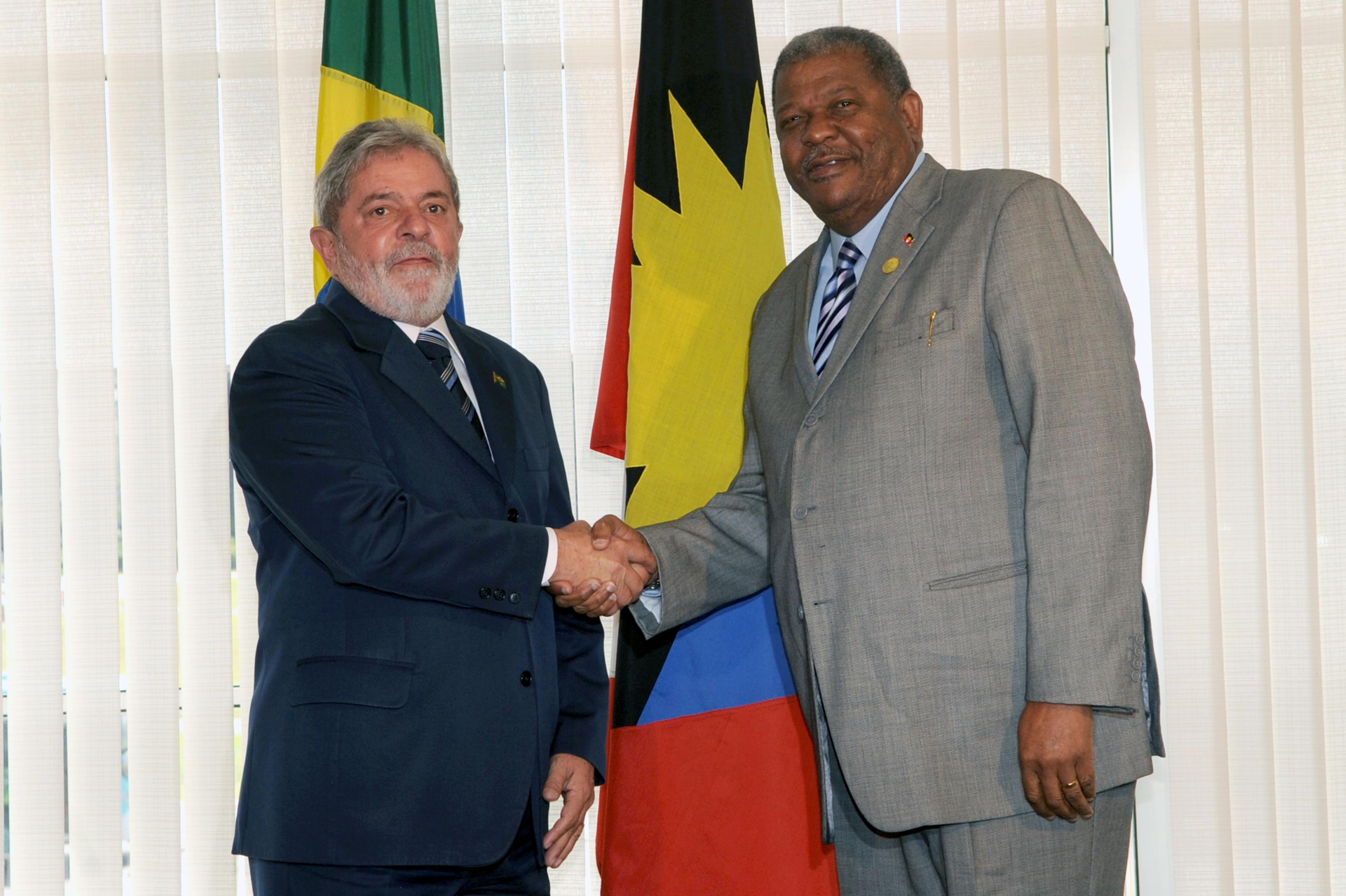
Spencer with the President of Brazil, Lula da Silva.

In 2004, Baldwin Spencer led the United Progressive Party to a landslide victory in the general election. He defeated Lester Bird's ALP, which had ruled Antigua and Barbuda for the previous 28 years. In Government he moved to enact a trio of good government reforms: a nationwide school meals programme, raising the minimum wage and paying all civil servants.

Internationally Baldwin Spencer is known as a skilled diplomat who helped his country assume the leadership of the Group of 77 in 2008. He received the highest order of Côte d'Ivoire, the Commander of the National Order. He was also recognized by the United Nations for his leadership, receiving the Millennium Development Goals Achievement Award in recognition for his work advancing the cause of international development.

The UPP won the March 2009 election with a reduced majority of nine out of 17 seats. Spencer himself defeated ALP candidate Gail Christian in the St John's Rural West constituency, receiving 2,259 votes against 1,753 for Christian. Spencer said on this occasion that it would "not be business as usual", and he was promptly sworn in for another term as prime minister when vote counting was completed.

After 10 years in power, the UPP was defeated by the ALP in the general election held on 12 June 2014. Out of 17 seats, the UPP retained only three; Spencer won re-election to his own seat by a very narrow margin. Spencer accepted defeat, saying that the people had clearly chosen the ALP. He was succeeded as prime minister by ALP leader Gaston Browne on 13 June.

== Personal life ==
Spencer is married to Jacklyn Spencer and is the father of two children. On 16 August 2008, Spencer was inducted as an honorary member of the Pathfinder Club, a Seventh-day Adventist youth service organization, during a gathering of more than 3,000 Pathfinders from around the Caribbean.

On 19 February 2022, Spencer was involved in a car accident close to the Townhouse Megastore in St. John's, but was reported to be unhurt.

On 3 July 2023, Spencer was fined ECD 500 for court's contempt by Judge Jan Drysdale after his cell phone rang during the election court challenge against Kelvin Simon regarding his nomination as a UPP candidate for the general elections in January 2023.

== See also ==
- List of foreign ministers in 2014

Political offices
Preceded by Lester Bird	Prime Minister of Antigua and Barbuda; 2004–2014	Succeeded by Gaston Browne
Preceded by Harold Lovell	Foreign Minister of Antigua and Barbuda; 6 January 2005 – 13 June 2014	Succeeded by Charles Fernandez
