= Errol Cort =

Errol Cort, CBE is a Antigua and Barbuda politician, lawyer and economist. He was Minister of Justice and Legal Affairs and Attorney General of Antigua and Barbuda from 1999 to 2001 and has been involved with successful electoral reforms in the country. He served as Minister of Finance between 2004 and 2009 and is a member of the United Progressive Party (UPP), representing St. John's Rural East. Other ministerial positions held include Industry, Commerce, Customs, Investment, Economic Planning and Development, and Financial Services Regulation, Property Valuation and Tax Compliance.

In 2011, he was involved in a US$1 million lawsuit with the Stanford International Bank (SIB), owned by Allen Stanford.
