= Lester Bird =

Prime Minister of Antigua and Barbuda from 1994 to 2004

The Right Honourable Sir Lester Bird KNH
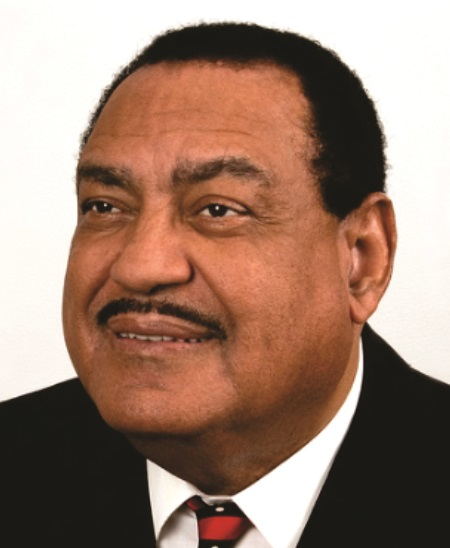
- Official portrait, 2014

2nd Prime Minister of Antigua and Barbuda
- In office 9 March 1994 – 24 March 2004
- Monarch: Elizabeth II
- Governor-General: James Carlisle
- Preceded by: Vere Bird
- Succeeded by: Baldwin Spencer

Finance Minister of Antigua and Barbuda
- In office 1991–1991
- Prime Minister: Vere Bird
- Preceded by: John Eugene St. Luce
- Succeeded by: Molwyn Joseph
- In office 2001–2003
- Prime Minister: Himself
- Preceded by: John Eugene St. Luce
- Succeeded by: Robin Yearwood

Leader of the Opposition
- In office March 2009 – December 2012
- Preceded by: Steadroy Benjamin
- Succeeded by: Gaston Browne

Personal details
- Born: 21 February 1938 New York City, US
- Died: 9 August 2021 (aged 83) Hodges Bay, Saint John, Antigua and Barbuda
- Party: Labour
- Education: University of Michigan

Sports career
Medal record
Men's athletics
Representing British West Indies
Pan American Games
Bronze medal – third place	1959 Chicago	Long jump

Sir Lester Bryant Bird KNH (21 February 1938 – 9 August 2021) was an Antiguan politician and athlete who served as the second prime minister of Antigua and Barbuda from 1994 to 2004. He was chairman of the Antigua Labour Party (ALP) from 1971 to 1983, then became prime minister when his father, Sir Vere Bird, the previous prime minister, resigned.

== Early life and education ==
Bird was born in New York City on 21 February 1938 to Vere Bird and his Barbudan wife Lydia. Lester and his elder brother Vere Bird Jr., also a British-educated lawyer, were considered sometime rivals, with The New York Times writing in 1990 that Lester had always overshadowed his brother, according to those who have known them both. He was educated at Antigua Grammar School and was brought up as a Methodist. Bird was a cricketer in his youth, playing for the Leeward Islands, and a long jump champion. He won a bronze medal in the long jump at the 1959 Pan American Games in Chicago while representing the British West Indies. He attended the University of Michigan, where he was All-American long jumper in 1960 and graduated in 1962. Bird completed his study of law in Britain and was called to the bar at Gray's Inn in 1969. From 1969 to 1976, Bird engaged in private practice in Antigua.

== Political career ==
Bird's political career began in 1971, when he was nominated to the Senate. The frequently-dominant Antigua Labour Party was in opposition for a five-year period. Bird was named chairman of the ALP and the leader of the opposition in the Senate. Lester continued to serve as leader of the opposition until he was elected to the House of Representatives at the 1976 elections, when the ALP returned to power. Bird joined his father's government as Deputy Premier. In addition to serving as Deputy Prime Minister, Bird also served as Minister of Economic Development, Tourism, and Energy. Bird's tenure as Minister of Tourism and Minister of Economic Development was controversial, and he personally benefited from tourism partnerships with foreign investors, including in the construction of the Royal Antiguan Hotel.

Following independence in 1981, Bird gained the external affairs portfolio and was the first chairman of the Organization of Eastern Caribbean States in 1982. He was chairman of OECS for a second time in 1989. The ALP government and Bird himself won re-election in 1994 and 1999. These elections, as well as the 1989 elections, were highly controversial; the 1989 elections were "marred by irregularities and fraud" and charges made by the opposition, described as credible by Freedom House, that the ALP used bribery and intimidation and exerted undue influence over the elections supervisor. The 1999 election was deemed neither free nor fair in an independent report which concluded that the opposition United Progressive Party (UPP) "conceivably could have won a majority of seats in parliament" if the election had been fair.

The ALP had been divided by a succession crisis between Lester Bird and Vere Bird Jr., since 1989. Lester Bird lost his deputy prime minister post in 1991, but retained the external affairs ministry and the planning and trade portfolio. Sir Vere Bird was initially thought to have favoured Vere Jr. until an arms scandal in which the elder son had been found to have been involved in the smuggling of weapons from Antigua to the Colombian Medellín Cartel. Vere Bird Jr., then Minister of Public Works, was dismissed from office and an inquiry, led by Sir Louis Blom-Cooper, Q.C., recommended that he never be allowed to hold office again (although he subsequently did return to office), boosting Lester Bird's chances to follow his father in the prime ministership and reducing pressure for Vere Bird to step down.

In 1992, another scandal, involving Sir Vere Bird's siphoning of public funds into a personal account, furthered calls for him to step down, with three opposition parties uniting to form the UPP under the leadership of Baldwin Spencer. Following a successful general strike called by the UPP, Sir Vere announced in March 1992 he would step down at the 1994 general elections. The ALP succession crisis continued following this, with a special convention to elect a successor on 24 May 1992 resulting in a deadlock between Lester Bird and John St. Luce, the information minister. The ALP leadership question was finally settled at the party's September 1993 convention, at which Lester won the leadership of the party, defeating St Luce, 169 votes to 131. The party post of ALP chairman went to Vere Jr.

In the March 1994 elections, the ALP under Bird's leadership won 11 out of 17 seats even as the opposition criticized the ALP over corruption issues. During the election the ALP pledged open government, an ombudsman to deal with citizen complaints, and new jobs, especially in tourism. Bird assumed the prime ministership on 9 March 1994. He appointed St. Luce (but not his brother Vere Jr.) to the cabinet. (Vere Jr. was subsequently named special adviser). Lester Bird took the portfolios for external affairs, planning, social services, and information for himself, and in a 1996 cabinet reshuffle also took the communications, civil aviation, international transport, and gaming portfolios.

In the 1999 elections, the ALP increased its parliamentary majority by one seat, holding 12 seats. Bird was reconfirmed as prime minister and elevated Vere Jr. to the cabinet as minister of agriculture, marking his full political rehabilitation. Bird also shuffled his own portfolios and by December 2002 held the foreign affairs, finance, legal affairs, justice, and national security ministries in addition to being the prime minister.

In the March 2004 election, the ALP was defeated by the United Progressive Party (UPP) led by Baldwin Spencer. Bird's party lost eight seats, and he himself was defeated by Errol Cort, who became Minister of Finance in the new UPP government.

Bird remained the ALP's political leader following the party's 2004 defeat. He led the party in the March 2009 election; although the ALP lost the election, it gained 3 seats from the UPP and Bird defeated Cort by 96 votes in the St John's Rural East constituency, where he had lost in 2004. He subsequently held the position of Leader of Her Majesty's Loyal Opposition.

Bird was succeeded as ALP leader by Gaston Browne in December 2012, who led the party to victory in June 2014 general election. Bird won a seat and again defeated Errol Cort.

In 2014, he was made a Knight of the Order of the National Hero (KNH) by Antigua and Barbuda.

== Death ==
Bird died at the age of 83 on 9 August 2021.

== See also ==
- Bruce Rappaport
- List of foreign ministers in 2004

Political offices
Preceded by Sir Vere Cornwall Bird	Prime Minister of Antigua and Barbuda; 1994–2004	Succeeded by Baldwin Spencer
Preceded by Position created	Foreign Minister of Antigua and Barbuda; 1981–1991	Succeeded by Vere Bird
Preceded by John Eugene St. Luce	Finance Minister of Antigua and Barbuda; 1991	Succeeded by Molwyn Joseph
Preceded by Vere Bird	Foreign Minister of Antigua and Barbuda; 1991–2004	Succeeded by Harold Lovell
Preceded by John Eugene St. Luce	Finance Minister of Antigua and Barbuda; 2001–2003	Succeeded by Robin Yearwood
