= 4th legislature of Antigua and Barbuda =

Parliament of Antigua and Barbuda (1965–1970)

The 4th legislature of Antigua and Barbuda was elected on Monday, 29 November 1965, and was dissolved on Saturday, 5 December 1970.

On February 27, 1967, the parliament transferred from a unicameral Legislative Assembly into a bicameral Parliament.

== Members ==
=== Senate ===
- William Burton
- Joseph Myers
- Morris Francis
- Novelle Richards
- Levi Joseph
- Christian Simon
- John Meade
- John F. Shoul
- S. R. Mendes
- Dr. L. R. Wynter
- Gerald Owen Anderson Watt
- Joseph Alexander Stevens
- Claude-Earl Alexander Theophilus Francis

=== House of Representatives/Legislative Assembly ===
Speaker: Denfield Hurst

Representative	Constituency	Party
Lionel A. Hurst	St. John's City North	ALP
Edmund Lake	St. John's City South	ALP
Vere Bird Chief Minister/Premier	St. John's Rural West	ALP
George Sheppard	St. John's Rural South	ALP
Denfield Hurst	St. John Rural North	ALP
Joseph Lawrence	St. George	ALP
Bradley Carrott	St. Mary	ALP
Donald Sheppard	St. Peter/St. Philip	ALP
Ernest Williams	St. Paul	ALP
McChesney George	Barbuda	ALP
