= 5th legislature of Antigua and Barbuda =

Parliament of Antigua and Barbuda (1971–1976)

The 5th legislature of Antigua and Barbuda was elected on Thursday, 11 February 1971 and dissolved on Saturday, 31 January 1976.

It was the only parliament with a PLM majority.

== Members ==
=== Senate ===
Party	Representative	Role	Years
PLM	Clarence Harney	President	1971-1976
ALP	Keithly Heath	President	1976

=== House of Representatives ===
Speaker: Cecil Hewlett (1971-1975), Unknown (1975-1976)

Party	Representative	Constituency
PLM	Donald Halstead	St. John's City West
PLM	Basil Peters	St. John's City East
PLM	Sydney Christian	St. John's City South
PLM	Selwyn Walter	St. John's Rural West
PLM	Geoffrey Scotland	St. John's Rural South
PLM	Gerald Watt	St. John's Rural East
ALP	Denfield Hurst	St. John's Rural North
PLM	Robert Hall	St. Mary's North
PLM	Victor McKay	St. Mary's South
PLM	Wilbert Sterling	St. Lukes
PLM	George Walter	All Saints
PLM	Sydney Prince	St. George
ALP	Joseph Myers	St. Peter
ALP	Donald Sheppard	St. Phillip North
PLM	Cyril James	St. Phillip South
ALP	Ernest Williams	St. Paul
PLM	Claude-Earl Francis	Barbuda
