= 1st legislature of Antigua and Barbuda =

Parliament of Antigua and Barbuda (1951–1956)

The 1st legislature of Antigua and Barbuda was elected on Thursday, 20 December 1951 and was dissolved on 5 October 1956.

It held its first meeting on 3 January 1952.

== Members ==
=== Legislative Assembly ===
Party	Representative	Constituency
ALP	Lionel A. Hurst	St. John's City North
ALP	Edmund Lake	St. John's City South/Barbuda
ALP	Vere Bird	St. John's Rural West
ALP	Novelle Richards	St. John's Rural South
ALP	Denfield Hurst	St. George/St. John Rural North
ALP	Bradley Carrott	St. Mary
ALP	Donald Sheppard	St. Peter/St. Philip
ALP	Ernest Williams	St. Paul

Nominated Members
Alexander Moody-Stuart*
Sydney Christian*
R. Cadman

*J. L. E. Jeffrey, OBE, served as a temporary nominated member for 10 weeks starting 25 April 1952 during the leave that was given to Sydney Christian.
