= 2nd legislature of Antigua and Barbuda =

Parliament of Antigua and Barbuda (1956–1960)

The 2nd legislature of Antigua and Barbuda was elected on Thursday, 1 November 1956, and was dissolved on Saturday, 29 October 1960.

From 3 January 1958, the islands were a province of the West Indies Federation.

It had its first meeting on 5 November 1956.

== Members ==
=== Legislative Assembly ===
| Representative | Constituency | Party |
|---|---|---|
| Lionel A. Hurst | St. John's City North | ALP |
| Edmund Lake Minister of Social Services | St. John's City South/Barbuda | ALP |
| Vere Bird Minister of Trade and Production | St. John's Rural West | ALP |
| Novelle Richards | St. John's Rural South | ALP |
| Denfield Hurst | St. George/St. John Rural North | ALP |
| Bradley Carrott Minister without Portfolio | St. Mary | ALP |
| Donald Sheppard | St. Peter/St. Philip | ALP |
| Ernest Williams Minister of Public Works and Communication | St. Paul | ALP |

Nominated Members
Alexander Moody-Stuart
Luther Wynter
Stephen Mendez
