= 3rd legislature of Antigua and Barbuda =

Parliament of Antigua and Barbuda (1960–1965)

The Assembly in 1961

The 3rd legislature of Antigua and Barbuda was elected on Tuesday, 29 November 1960 and was dissolved in 1965.

Until 31 May 1962, the islands were a province of the West Indies Federation.

== Members ==
=== Legislative Assembly ===
Speaker: Cecil Hewlett

Party	Representative	Constituency
ALP	Lionel A. Hurst	St. John's City North
ALP	Edmund Lake	St. John's City South
ALP	Vere Bird Chief Minister	St. John's Rural West
ALP	George Sheppard	St. John's Rural South
ALP	Denfield Hurst	St. John Rural North
ALP	Joseph Lawrence	St. George
ALP	Christian Simon	St. Mary
ALP	Donald Sheppard	St. Peter/St. Philip
ALP	Ernest Williams	St. Paul
ALP	McChesney George	Barbuda
