= 2025 in Antigua and Barbuda =

- Decades: 2000s; 2010s; 2020s
- See also: Other events of 2025; Timeline of Antiguan and Barbudan history

This article lists events from the year 2025 in Antigua and Barbuda.

== Incumbents ==
- Monarch: Charles III
- Governor-General: Rodney Williams
- Prime Minister: Gaston Browne

== Events ==
- 14 January – 2025 St. Peter by-election
- 26 March – 2025 Barbuda Council election
- 25 June – 2025 Antiguan and Barbudan census
- 16 December – US President Donald Trump issues a proclamation imposing partial travel restrictions on Antiguan nationals travelling to the United States.

== Holidays ==
- 1 January – New Year's Day
- 18 April – Good Friday
- 21 April – Easter Monday
- 6 May – Labour Day
- 9 June – Whit Monday
- 4 August – Carnival Monday
- 5 August – Carnival Tuesday
- 11 September – National Day of Prayer
- 1 November – Independence Day
- 9 December – National Heroes' Day
- 25 December – Christmas Day
- 26 December – Boxing Day

== Deaths ==
- 13 December – Sir Gerald Watt, 86, MP (1971–1976) and speaker of the House of Representatives (2014–2024)

== See also ==
- 2020s
- 2025 Atlantic hurricane season
- 2025 in the Caribbean
- List of acts of the Parliament of Antigua and Barbuda from 2025
