= 2018 in Antigua and Barbuda =

- Decades: 1990s; 2000s; 2010s; 2020s
- See also: Other events of 2018; Timeline of Antiguan and Barbudan history

== Incumbents ==
- Monarch: Elizabeth II
- Governor-General: Rodney Williams
- Prime Minister: Gaston Browne

== Events ==
- 1 January – 2018 New Year Honours
- 21 March – 2018 Antiguan general election
- 6 November – 2018 Antiguan constitutional referendum

== Sports ==
- 2017–18 Antigua and Barbuda Premier Division.
