= 2023 in Antigua and Barbuda =

- Decades: 2000s; 2010s; 2020s
- See also: Other events of 2023; Timeline of Antiguan and Barbudan history

== Incumbents ==
- Monarch: Charles III
- Governor-General: Rodney Williams
- Prime Minister: Gaston Browne

== Events ==
Ongoing — COVID-19 pandemic in Antigua and Barbuda

- 18 January – 2023 Antiguan general election: Citizens in Antigua and Barbuda elect members of the House of Representatives. The Labour Party retains its majority.
- 29 March – 2023 Barbuda Council election
- 6 May – Coronation of Charles III as King of Antigua and Barbuda and the other Commonwealth realms. Governor-General Sir Rodney Williams and Prime Minister Gaston Browne attend the ceremony in London.
- 24 October – 2023 St. Mary's South by-election
