= 2026 in Antigua and Barbuda =

- Decades: 2000s; 2010s; 2020s
- See also: Other events of 2026; Timeline of Antiguan and Barbudan history

This article lists events from the year 2026 in Antigua and Barbuda.

== Incumbents ==
- Monarch: Charles III
- Governor-General: Rodney Williams
- Prime Minister: Gaston Browne

== Events ==
- 13 March – 2026 St. Philip's North by-election
- 30 April – 2026 Antiguan general election: The ruling Antigua and Barbuda Labour Party of prime minister Gaston Browne wins a fourth consecutive term in government after gaining 15 of 17 seats in the House of Representatives.
- 2 May – Prime minister Gaston Browne is inaugurated for a fourth term.
- 5 May – The Browne cabinet is sworn into office with an oath that removes references to the monarchy after more than 40 years.
- 1–4 November – 2026 Commonwealth Heads of Government Meeting in St. John's.
- 3 November – At the Commonwealth Heads of Government Meeting, King Charles III expresses "sorrow" about the transatlantic slave trade.

== Holidays ==
- 1 January – New Year's Day
- 18 April – Good Friday
- 21 April – Easter Monday
- 6 May – Labour Day
- 9 June – Whit Monday
- 4–5 August – Carnival
- 1 November – Independence Day
- 9 December – National Heroes' Day
- 25 December – Christmas Day
- 26 December – Boxing Day

== Deaths ==
- 20 February – Eustace Lake, MP (2009–2018).
- 5 May – Cheryl Mary Clare Hurst, senator (2014–2026).

== See also ==
- 2020s
- 2026 in the Caribbean
