= 2022 in Antigua and Barbuda =

- Decades: 2000s; 2010s; 2020s
- See also: Other events of 2022; Timeline of Antiguan and Barbudan history

== Incumbents ==
- Monarch: Elizabeth II (until 8 September), then Charles III
- Governor-General: Rodney Williams
- Prime Minister: Gaston Browne

== Events ==
Ongoing — COVID-19 pandemic in Antigua and Barbuda

- 8 September – Accession of Charles III as King of Antigua and Barbuda following the death of Queen Elizabeth II.
- 10 September– Charles III is officially proclaimed King of Antigua and Barbuda at Government's House in St. John's.
- 11 September – Prime Minister Gaston Browne announces his intention to hold a referendum on transitioning the country into a republic.
- 19 September – A national holiday is observed on the day of the funeral of Elizabeth II, Queen of Antigua and Barbuda. The governor-general and the prime minister attend the queen's state funeral in the United Kingdom.
- 19 September – A service of Thanksgiving for Queen Elizabeth II is held at the Cathedral of St John The Divine.

== Deaths ==
- 8 September – Elizabeth II, Queen of Antigua and Barbuda (born 1926)
