= 2024 in Antigua and Barbuda =

- Decades: 2000s; 2010s; 2020s
- See also: Other events of 2024; Timeline of Antiguan and Barbudan history

This article lists events from the year 2024 in Antigua and Barbuda.

== Incumbents ==
- Monarch: Charles III
- Governor-General: Rodney Williams
- Prime Minister: Gaston Browne

== Holidays ==
- 1 January - New Year's Day
- 29 March – Good Friday
- 1 April - Easter Monday
- 6 May - Labour Day
- 20 May - Whit Monday
- 5–6 August - Carnival
- 1 November – Independence Day
- 9 December - National Heroes' Day
- 25 December – Christmas Day
- 26 December – Boxing Day

== Sports ==
- Antigua and Barbuda at the 2024 Summer Olympics

== Deaths ==
- 5 November – Asot Michael, 54, politician, MP (since 2004).

== See also ==
- 2020s
- 2024 Atlantic hurricane season
- 2024 in the Caribbean
- List of acts of the Parliament of Antigua and Barbuda from 2024
