= Royal tours of Antigua and Barbuda =

Visits to Antigua and Barbuda by royals

I will never forget the warmth of your people and the incredible natural beauty of the islands. It has been a great privilege for me to watch Antigua and Barbuda develop into the confident country it is today with a strong national identity and a positive outlook.

— Elizabeth II of Antigua and Barbuda, 2016

Royal tours of Antigua and Barbuda by its royal family have been taking place since the 20th century. Elizabeth II, Queen of Antigua and Barbuda (r. 1981–2022), visited the country thrice: in 1966, 1977, and 1985. In 2026, Charles III, King of Antigua and Barbuda visited the country for the 45th anniversary of independence celebrations and the 2026 Commonwealth Heads of Government Meeting.

Other members of the royal family have also paid visits.

== 20th century ==
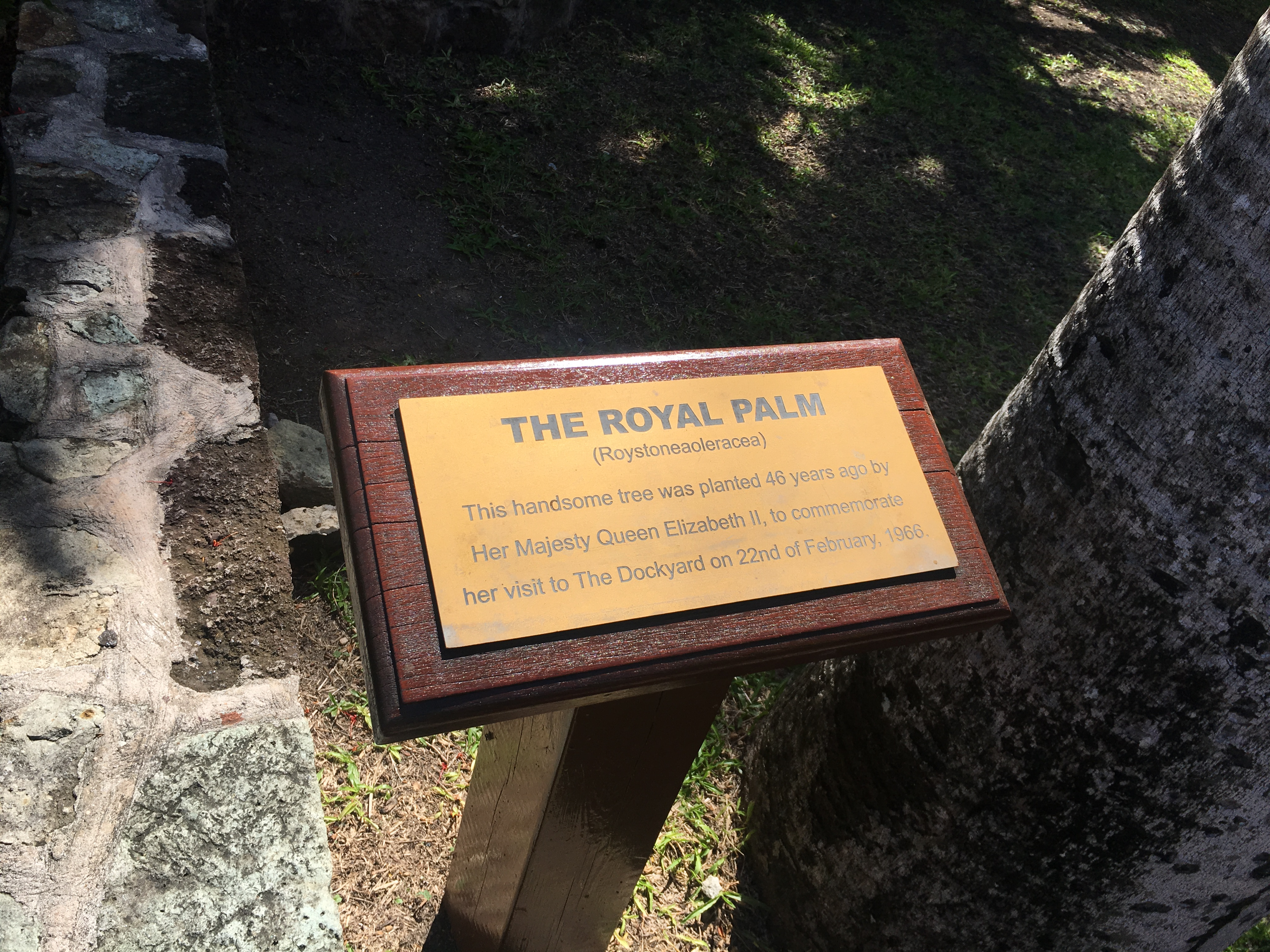
A plaque commemorating the planting of a palm tree by the Queen in 1966 at Nelson's Dockyard, Antigua

Princess Margaret visited Antigua in 1955.

Queen Elizabeth The Queen Mother visited on 17 March 1964. Princess Alice visited on 10 and 19 March 1964 during her Caribbean tour as Chancellor of the University of the West Indies. The Duke of Edinburgh visited in November 1964.

Queen Elizabeth II, and her consort, the Duke of Edinburgh, visited Antigua and Barbuda during their Caribbean tour of 1966. During the visit, they visited the capital city of Saint John's, where they attended an Investiture at Government House and Divine Service at St John's Cathedral at which Prince Philip read the lesson.

The Queen and the Duke visited again during the Silver Jubilee tour of October 1977, staying onboard HMY Britannia. The Queen opened the New Administration Building and attended a lunch held by the Governor at Clarence House.

In 1981, Princess Margaret represented her sister, Queen Elizabeth II, at the independence celebrations in the capital St John's. "Greetings from the Queen, welcome to the Commonwealth", Princess Margaret said at midnight after the flag-raising ceremony. The Princess presented Antigua and Barbuda's instruments of independence to Prime Minister V C Bird, formally declaring the country independent. The Princess opened the new Antigua and Barbuda Parliament building, and delivered the Speech from the Throne, on behalf of the Queen.

This lovely island of Antigua with its sister Barbuda can form an admirable example of how a small nation can hold its head high among all the nations of the Commonwealth and the world. May God bless you all.

— Elizabeth II of Antigua and Barbuda, 1985

The Queen of Antigua and Barbuda visited in 1985, and met patients and staff in the new Children's Ward of the Holberton Hospital following a Commonwealth Heads of Government Meeting in the Bahamas.

== 21st century ==
=== 2000s ===
The Duke of York visited in January 2001.

The Earl of Wessex visited Antigua and Barbuda in October 2003 as Trustee of The Duke of Edinburgh's Award International Association. The Earl attended a dinner at the Jumby Bay Hotel. The Earl of Wessex also visited the British Military Training Team at the Antigua and Barbuda Defence Force. The Earl presented awards to those who have achieved their Gold Standard.

The Earl of Wessex visited again in 2006 to represent the Queen at the celebrations marking the country's twenty fifth anniversary of independence. On 30 October, the Earl attended the Joint Sitting of Parliament at the new Parliament Building in Saint John's. The Earl visited the Salvation Army Sunshine Home for Girls, and the Boys Training School, Comfort Hall, Saint John's on 31 October. On 1 November, the Earl represented the Queen at the Independence Parade, at Government House, Saint John's, and later attended an Independence Day Reception at Government House. The Earl also attended the Independence Day Food Fair, and the Twenty Fifth Anniversary of Independence Gala Dinner at the Grand Royal Antiguan Hotel, Saint John's. On 2 November, the Earl attended a reception at Codrington Wharf, Barbuda, and later attended a lunch with the Barbuda Council at the Beach House Hotel.

=== 2010s ===
In March 2012, the Earl and Countess of Wessex, visited Antigua and Barbuda to mark the Queen's Diamond Jubilee. On their arrival, they were greeted by Governor-General Dame Louise Lake-Tack, Prime Minister Baldwin Spencer, and members of Parliament. The couple then visited the Copper and Lumber Store Hotel where they met with prominent Antiguans and Barbudans. Following that, the Earl and the Countess toured the Dockyard Museum and saw the "Royal Palm" that the Queen planted in the Dockyard in 1966. A tree planting ceremony in Nelson's Dockyard, was followed by a tour of the Dow's Hill Interpretation Centre at Shirley Heights. The afternoon concluded with a lunch at the Admiral's Inn in Nelson's Dockyard hosted by the Prime Minister. On Tuesday evening, the Governor-General hosted an official State Dinner for the couple at the Mill Reef Club. During the second day of their visit, the Earl and the Countess visited institutions which were related to their personal charity work. The Countess visited the Children's Ward at Mount Saint John's Medical Centre, Princess Margaret School, and the Adele School for Special Children in St. John's, while the Earl visited the Duke of Edinburgh Award Programme and the Antigua Grammar School. To close their visit to Antigua and Barbuda, Prince Edward and Countess Sophie enjoyed a Diamond Jubilee Lunch at the Jumby Bay Resort on Long Island.

External videos
- Prince Harry visits Antigua and Barbuda; Source: AP Archive.

Prince Harry visited in 2016 to mark the 35th anniversary of independence of Antigua and Barbuda. The Prince attended a reception hosted by the Governor General Sir Rodney Williams, which featured cultural performances related to Antiguan life. At the Sir Vivian Richards Stadium, the Prince attended a Youth Sports Festival, where he was hosted by three Antiguan and Barbudan cricketers: Sir Vivian Richards, Sir Andy Roberts and Sir Curtly Ambrose. The Prince later attended a Charities Showcase event in the tropical grounds of Government House, St John's. The Prince visited Barnacle Point to attend a reception hosted by Prime Minister Gaston Browne. At the reception, Prime Minister Browne, referring to the announcement of the Prince's engagement to Meghan Markle earlier that month, said, "I just want to say that should you make the decision to honeymoon - then Antigua and Barbuda want to welcome you". On the island of Barbuda, the Prince visited the Holy Trinity Primary School, and Sir McChesney George High School. On return to Antigua, the Prince unveiled Antigua and Barbuda's dedication towards The Queen's Commonwealth Canopy project at the Victoria Park Botanical Gardens in St John's.

The plight of those who have been through such terrifying devastation and are still enduring such dreadful privation is close to the heart of Her Majesty The Queen and, indeed, to my own. It is so important to all of us in the Commonwealth that the future of this special region is both prosperous and secure; and that the remarkable strength of spirit for which the Caribbean is renowned, continues to thrive and to offer an example to us all.

— Charles, Prince of Wales, 2017

In November 2017, Charles, the Prince of Wales visited Antigua and Barbuda to see how communities were recovering following the devastation caused by Hurricanes Irma and Maria. The Prince visited a centre for Barbudan evacuees, and attended a reception in the capital St John's. The Prince later travelled to the island of Barbuda to see the devastation first-hand and met survivors and charity workers. In Barbuda, the Prince also visited the Holy Trinity School, which was severely damaged, and heard about the recovery effort.

=== 2020s ===
The Earl and Countess of Wessex visited in April 2022 to mark the Queen's Platinum Jubilee. The couple were welcomed with a Guard of Honour, and later met cricketers legends Sir Viv Richards, Sir Richie Richardson and Sir Curtly Ambrose during a visit to the Sir Vivian Richards Stadium. They later met Prime Minister Gaston Browne who told the couple that he aspires "at some point to become a republic", and acknowledged that such a move is "not on the cards", and Antigua and Barbuda will continue as a monarchy for "some time to follow". At Government House, the Earl and Countess met local craftspeople, creatives and community groups during a reception, and they presented three Platinum Jubilee medals to three people to recognise their service to national security. At the National Sailing Academy, the couple met disabled sailors benefitting from the Sail-ability programme. Later at Clarence House, the Earl and countess each planted a tree to mark the Queen's Platinum Jubilee.

From 30 October to 4 November 2026, Charles III, King of Antigua and Barbuda and Queen Camilla visited the country to celebrate the 45th anniversary of independence and attend the 28th Commonwealth Heads of Government Meeting. On 1 November, the King and Queen attended a church service and the annual Independence Parade at Sir Vivian Richards Stadium, marking 45 years of the country's independence. They were accompanied by Governor-General, Sir Rodney Williams and Prime Minister, Gaston Browne. The following day, during their visit to the Government House, the royal couple toured an exhibition about the history of Antigua and Barbuda and saw slavery artifacts from shackles to infamous ship diagrams. Speaking at the Commonwealth Heads of Government Meeting, the King described the transatlantic slave trade as a "shameful chapter of history" that filled him with "profound sorrow", but he did not offer a direct apology. Queen Camilla’s separate programme included engagements with students and young writers, continuing her longstanding advocacy for literacy and education. The couple also hosted an official dinner for Commonwealth delegations.
