= 2021 in Antigua and Barbuda =

- Decades: 2000s; 2010s; 2020s
- See also: Other events of 2021; Timeline of Antiguan and Barbudan history

== Incumbents ==
- Monarch: Elizabeth II
- Governor-General: Rodney Williams
- Prime Minister: Gaston Browne

== Events ==
Ongoing — COVID-19 pandemic in Antigua and Barbuda

- April 21 – The Sri Lankan government expels an Antigua-registered cargo ship docked at the Magampura Mahinda Rajapaksa Port after authorities discovered undeclared uranium hexafluoride bound for China. The government pledges to take legal action against the ship's owner.
- November 3 – A lawyer representing the governments of Antigua and Barbuda and Tuvalu says that a new commission is being formed to sue big polluters and claim damage reparations for climate change effects on those nations before the International Tribunal for the Law of the Sea.

== Death ==
- August 9 – Sir Lester Bird, 83, politician.
