= 2020 in Antigua and Barbuda =

- Decades: 2000s; 2010s; 2020s
- See also: Other events of 2020; Timeline of Antiguan and Barbudan history

== Incumbents ==
- Monarch: Elizabeth II
- Governor-General: Rodney Williams
- Prime Minister: Gaston Browne

== Events ==
Ongoing — COVID-19 pandemic in Antigua and Barbuda

- 1 January – 2020 New Year Honours
- 13 March – Prime Minister Gaston Browne confirms the first case of COVID-19 in Antigua and Barbuda.
- 28 March – A state of emergency is declared due to the COVID-19 pandemic.
- 1 June – Antigua and Barbuda reopened its borders to international travelers in a phased approach. Phase 1 allows arriving passengers to present a valid medical certificate stating a negative COVID-19 test result within the previous 48 hours. Visitors without a negative COVID-19 certificate are allowed entry on the condition that they quarantine at an approved hotel. Returning nationals without a certificate must submit to mandatory quarantine.

== Sports ==
- March 12 – The 2019–20 Antigua and Barbuda Premier Division is suspended due to the COVID-19 pandemic. The 2020–21 season is cancelled.
