= 2019 in Antigua and Barbuda =

- Decades: 1990s; 2000s; 2010s; 2020s
- See also: Other events of 2019; Timeline of Antiguan and Barbudan history

== Incumbents ==
- Monarch: Elizabeth II
- Governor-General: Rodney Williams
- Prime Minister: Gaston Browne

== Events ==
- 1 January – 2019 New Year Honours

== Sports ==
- 2018–19 Antigua and Barbuda Premier Division.
