= 1951 Antiguan protests =

- Date: 3 January 1951 – 8 August 1951
- Location: Antigua
- Caused by: Perceived exploitation of labour; Discontent with Antiguan plantocracy; Military occupation of St. John's
- Result: Wage increases; Antigua Trades and Labour Union permitted to negotiate on behalf of workers; ALP victory in 1951 general election

Parties
Antigua Trades and Labour Union	Government of Antigua; Antiguan plantocracy Antiguan Employers Federation; British Army

Lead figures
Vere Bird	Kenneth Blackburne Alexander Moody-Stuart

The 1951 Antiguan protests were a result of the perceived exploitation of labour by the Antiguan working class, especially those working as labourers in the agricultural sector. This movement began on 3 January 1951 when waterfront workers held a two-day strike for a pay increase. By 26 February, the Antigua Trades and Labour Union (ATLU) became involved after workers on the Weatherills plantation decided to go on strike until ATLU was recognised as their collective bargaining agent. By the spring, the movement had spread throughout the island, with workers throughout the island going on strike to celebrate Labour Day on 1 May.

A general strike commenced and the governor of the Leeward Islands at the time, Kenneth Blackburne, struggled to mediate tensions due to the intense rivalry between ATLU led by Vere Bird and the pro-plantocracy Antiguan Employers Federation by Alexander Moody-Stuart. The strike was not well received by all Antiguans and many workers were harassed due to their positions in favour of or against the strike. By 14 June, the police had convinced the governor to invite the army to occupy St. John's to prevent mass protests. Eventually the Malone Inquiry found that the occupation was of no use and the army left the city in July. The inquiry settled the dispute in favour of ATLU on 8 August and the union was legally permitted to strike. On 2 January 1952 many Antiguan workers received a 25% pay increase.

== See also ==
- Bethesda Tamarind Tree
