= 1st Parliament =

The 1st Parliament may refer to:

- 1st Bangsamoro Transition Authority Parliament (2019–2022)
- 1st Canadian Parliament (1867–1873)
- 1st Federal Parliament of Nepal (2018–2022)
- 1st Irish Parliament of King Charles I (1634–1635)
- 1st Malaysian Parliament (1959–1964)
- 1st New Zealand Parliament (1854–1855)
- 1st Parliament of Antigua and Barbuda (1951–1956)
- 1st Parliament of Botswana (1966–1969)
- 1st Parliament of British Columbia (1871–1875)
- 1st Parliament of Ceylon (1947–1952)
- 1st Parliament of Elizabeth I (1558–1559)
- 1st Parliament of Lower Canada (1792–1796)
- 1st Parliament of Ontario (1867–1871)
- 1st Parliament of Queen Anne (1702–1705)
- 1st Parliament of Singapore (1965–1968)
- 1st Parliament of the Province of Canada (1841–1844)
- 1st Parliament of the Turkish Republic of Northern Cyprus (1985–1990)
- 1st Parliament of Turkey (1920–1923)
- 1st Parliament of Upper Canada (1792–1796)
- 1st Parliament of Zimbabwe (1980–1985)
- 1st Scottish Parliament (1999–2003)
- First Parliament of Great Britain (1707–1708)
- First Parliament of the United Kingdom (1801–1802)
- First Protectorate Parliament (1654–1655)
