= Bethesda Tamarind Tree =

Official historic site of Antigua and Barbuda

- Location within Antigua and Barbuda
- 17°3′14″N 61°44′44″W
- Location: Bethesda, Antigua and Barbuda

National Cultural Heritage of Antigua and Barbuda
- Designated: 3 May 2003

The Bethesda Tamarind Tree is an individual tree about one mile from Bethesda, Antigua and Barbuda, designated as an official historical site on 3 May 2003. In 1951, sugarcane workers associated with the Antigua Trades and Labour Union met at the site with Alexander Moody-Stuart to resolve a major strike among his employees. It is considered an important landmark in the area.
