= Winston Williams (politician) =

Antiguan politician

Winston Williams MP

Member of the House of Representatives of Antigua and Barbuda
- In office 23 March 2004 – 9 February 2009
- Preceded by: Vere Bird Jr.
- Succeeded by: Eustace Lake
- Constituency: St. John's Rural South

Personal details
- Party: United Progressive Party

Winston Williams is an Antiguan United Progressive Party politician, who was elected as Member of Parliament for St. John's Rural South in the 2004 general election.
