= George Sheppard (politician) =

Antiguan politician

Member of the Legislative Council of Antigua and the House of Representatives
- In office 29 November 1960 – 5 December 1970
- Preceded by: Novelle Richards
- Succeeded by: Geoffrey Scotland
- Constituency: St. John's Rural South

Personal details
- Party: Antigua and Barbuda Labour Party

George Allington Sheppard was an Antiguan Labour Party politician, who was first elected as representative for St. John's Rural South in the 1960 general election.
