= Donald Christian =

Donald Christian may refer to:

- Donald Christian (cyclist)
- Donald Christian (politician)
