= Joseph Lawrence (Antiguan politician) =

Antiguan politician

Member of the Legislative Council of Antigua
- In office 29 November 1960 – 5 December 1970
- Preceded by: Denfield Hurst
- Succeeded by: Sydney Prince
- Constituency: St. George

Personal details
- Party: Antigua and Barbuda Labour Party

Joseph Lawrence was an Antiguan Labour Party politician, who was first elected as representative for St. George in the 1960 general election.
