= R. Cadman =

Antiguan politician

Member of the Legislative Council of Antigua
- In office 20 December 1951 – 5 October 1956
- Constituency: Nominated

R. Cadman was an Antiguan politician, who served as a nominated member of the Legislative Council of Antigua between 20 December 1951 and 5 October 1956.
