= Giselle Isaac-Arrindell =

Antiguan and Barbudan politician

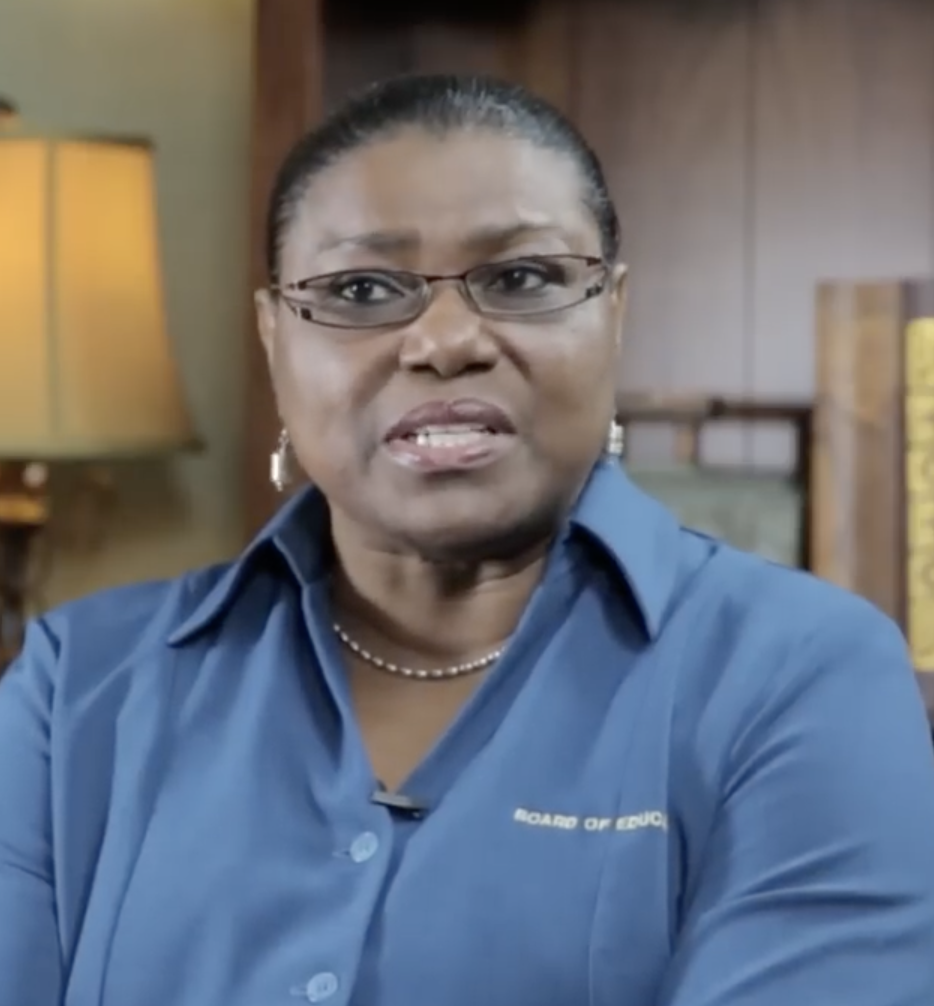
- Isaac-Arrindell in 2013

5th Speaker of the House of Representatives of Antigua and Barbuda
- In office 29 August 2004 – 16 May 2014
- Preceded by: Bridget Harris
- Succeeded by: Gerald Watt

Personal details
- Party: United Progressive Party

Giselle Isaac-Arrindell is an Antiguan and Barbudan politician who served as Speaker of the House of Representatives.

She was born in 1961. She became an executive director of the board of education in January 2001.

Isaac-Arrindell was appointed the Speaker of the House of Representatives on 29 August 2004, and served until 16 May 2014. The legitimacy of her appointment was challenged by Gaston Browne in courts. She has been a member of the United Progressive Party, and chairman of the party.
