= Bridget Harris =

Antiguan and Barbudan politician

4th Speaker of the House of Representatives of Antigua and Barbuda
- In office 21 March 1994 – 26 August 2004
- Preceded by: Casford Llewellyn Murray
- Succeeded by: Giselle Isaac-Arindell

Personal details
- Born: 1932-1934 All Saints, Antigua and Barbuda
- Party: Antigua and Barbuda Labour Party

Dame Bridget Harris (DCN) (also known as Bridgette Harris) is an Antiguan and Barbudan politician who served as Speaker of the House of Representatives. She was the first woman elected to the House of Representatives in 1994 as a member of the Antigua and Barbuda Labour Party. She was appointed as the speaker in 1994 and served until 2004. She was the first woman to serve as speaker of the house in Antigua and Barbuda. In 2001 she was appointed Dame Commander of the Most Distinguished Order of the Nation.

She was 86 years old in June 2019, so she was born about 1932-1934. She was born in All Saints, Antigua and Barbuda.

She was married to Reuben Harris, former finance minister.

== See also ==
- List of speakers of the House of Representatives of Antigua and Barbuda
