= Casford Murray =

Antiguan politician (died 2014)

Casford Llewellyn Murray

3rd Speaker of the House of Representatives of Antigua and Barbuda
- In office 18 February 1976 – 18 February 1994
- Preceded by: Cecil E. Hewlett
- Succeeded by: Bridget Harris

Personal details
- Born: ca. 1920
- Died: 23 June 2014
- Party: Antigua and Barbuda Labour Party

Casford Llewellyn Murray was an Antiguan and Barbudan politician and a long-term speaker of the House of Representatives.

He was a businessman, founding member of the bodybuilding association and farmer. He was also chairman of Antigua Carnival and a founding member of Antigua Commercial Bank.

He was the speaker of the House of Representatives from 1976 to 1994 during the government of Antigua and Barbuda Labour Party.

He died on 23 June 2014 at the age of 94 years, so he was born ca. 1920. His funeral was attended by the Prime Minister of Antigua and Barbuda.
