= List of acts of the Parliament of Antigua and Barbuda from 2024 =

This is a list of acts of the Parliament of Antigua and Barbuda passed in 2024. Some legislation passed in Antigua and Barbuda before 1981 may be considered an act of the parliament of Antigua and Barbuda even if it was passed under the Parliament of Antigua or the Legislative Council of Antigua.

== List ==
Short title	Long title	Citation	Royal assent
Airport Administration Charge (Amendment) Act, 2024	An Act to amend the airport Authority Charge Act 2012, No. 3 of 2012 and for other connected purposes.	No. 19 of 2024	30 September 2024
Anti-Gang Act, 2024	An Act to provide for the maintenance of public order and public safety by discouraging membership in criminal gangs and for the punishment of gang-related activity and for other connected purposes.	No. 17 of 2024	30 September 2024
Antigua and Barbuda Sales Tax (Amendment) Act, 2024	An Act to amend the Antigua and Barbuda Sales Tax Act 2006, No. 5 of 2006 and for other connected purposes.	No. 1 of 2024	2 April 2024
Appropriation Act, 2024	An Act to provide for the services of Antigua and Barbuda for the year ending on the 31st day of December 2025	No. 26 of 2024	20 December 2024
Borrowing Authorisation (2025 Budget) Act, 2024	An Act to authorize the borrowing of a sum of money to supplement the 2025 Budget and for other connected purposes	No. 27 of 2024	20 December 2024
Child Justice (Amendment) Act, 2024	An Act to amend the Child Justice Act 2015, providing a criminal justice process for children accused of committing serious criminal, dangerous weapon and firearm related offences, in addition to offences listed in schedule II and III and for other connected purposes.	No. 23 of 2024	30 September 2024
Companies (Amendment) (No. 2) Act, 2024	An Act to amend the Companies Act 1995, No. 18 of 1995 and for other connected purposes.	No. 25 of 2024	25 November 2024
Companies (Amendment) Act, 2024	An Act to amend the Companies Act 1995, No. 18 of 1995 and for other connected purposes.	No. 11 of 2024	23 May 2024
Criminal Proceedings (Trial by Judge Alone) (Amendment) Act, 2024	An Act to amend the Criminal Proceedings (Trial by Judge Alone) Act 2021, No. 8 of 2021 and for other connected purposes.	No. 7 of 2024	23 May 2024
Firearms (Amendment) Act, 2024	An Act to amend the Firearms Act, Cap. 171 to increase the penalties for offences under the Act and for other connected purposes.	No. 18 of 2024	30 September 2024
ICC Cricket World Cup West Indies Act, 2024	An Act to make provision for the efficient and effective staging of the ICC Cricket World Cup West Indies 2024 and for related purposes.	No. 8 of 2024	23 May 2024
Law (Miscellaneous Amendments) Act, 2024	An Act to amend the provisions of certain Acts of Parliament to strengthen the effectiveness of the legal and regulatory framework relating to global standards of transparency as it relates to ownership and identity information, accounting information and banking information and other related purposes.	No. 10 of 2024	23 May 2024
Magistrate's Code of Procedure (Amendment) (No. 2) Act, 2024	An Act to amend the Magistrate's Code of Procedure Act, Cap. 255 and for other connected purposes.	No. 24 of 2024	25 November 2024
Magistrate's Code of Procedure (Amendment) Act, 2024	An Act to amend the Magistrate's Code of Procedure Act, Cap. 255 to provide for an increase in the criminal penalties that a Magistrate may impose and for other connected purposes.	No. 22 of 2024	30 September 2024
Midwifery (Amendment) Act, 2024	An Act to amend the Midwifery Act, Cap. 281 and for other connected purposes.	No. 16 of 2024	26 August 2024
Misuse of Drugs (Amendment) Act, 2024	An Act to amend the Misuse of Drugs Act, Cap. 283 to provide for an increase in the penalty for the possession of cannabis and to remove the provision that regulates the issuing of violation tickets.	No. 21 of 2024	30 September 2024
Money Services Business (Transfer) Levy Act, 2024	An Act to introduce a tax on the transfer of money out of Antigua and Barbuda and to provide for the imposition, collection and administration of the money services business (transfer) levy and for other connected purposes.	No. 2 of 2024	2 April 2024
National Bureau of Statistics (Amendment) Act, 2024	An Act to amend the National Bureau of Statistics Act 2013, No. 9 of 2013	No. 14 of 2024	26 August 2024
Physical Planning (Amendment) Act, 2024	An Act to amend the Physical Planning Act 2003, No. 6 of 2003 to provide for the introduction of a Deputy Town and Country Planner, to revise the powers of entry and the penalties for various offences and breaches of the Act and for other incidental and connected purposes.	No. 15 of 2024	26 August 2024
Prevention of Terrorism (Amendment) Act, 2024	An Act to amend the Prevention of Terrorism Act 2005, No. 12 of 2005 to strengthen the legal framework relating to the prevention of terrorism and countering terrorist financing and for other connected purposes.	No. 12 of 2024	23 May 2024
Revenue (Miscellaneous Provisions) Act, 2024	An Act to amend various tax laws to remove the discretionary power of the Minister to waive taxes and to provide the infrastructural framework for accounting for waivers of customs duties and for other connected purposes.	No. 5 of 2024	23 May 2024
Small Charges (Amendment) Act, 2024	An Act to amend the Small Charges Act, Cap. 405 to maintain public safety and the safety of children by discouraging the practice of children loitering and requiring them to be accompanied by a parent between the hours of 10pm to 6am and for other connected purposes.	No. 20 of 2024	30 September 2024
Special Economic Zone (Amendment) Act, 2024	An Act to amend the provisions of the Special Economic Zone to amend the constitution of the Special Economic Zones Advisory Board and for other connected purposes.	No. 4 of 2024	2 April 2024
Tax Administration and Procedure (Amendment) Act, 2024	An Act to amend the Tax Administration and Procedure Act 2018, No. 12 of 2018 and for other connected purposes.	No. 3 of 2024	2 April 2024
Weapons of Mass Destruction (Prohibition and Non-Proliferation) Act, 2024	An Act to eliminate or prevent the Proliferation of Nuclear, Chemical and Biological Weapons.	No. 6 of 2024	23 May 2024
