= Millicent Percival =

Antiguan and Barbudan politician

President of the Senate of Antigua and Barbuda
- In office 21 March 1994 – 26 February 2004
- Preceded by: Bradley Carrott
- Succeeded by: Edmond Mansoor

Personal details
- Born: Antigua and Barbuda
- Died: 21 October 2015
- Party: Antigua and Barbuda Labour Party

Millicent Percival (died 2015) was an Antiguan and Barbudan politician and former President of the Senate of Antigua and Barbuda. She was first appointed to the Senate in April 1984. She served as President of the Senate of Antigua and Barbuda from 21 March 1994 to 26 February 2004. She was also a leading member within the women's groups of the Antigua Trades and Labour Union and the Antigua Labour Party. She was accorded an Official Funeral at the St. George's Anglican Church in Fitches Creek on 11 November 2016.
