= Antigua National Party =

Antiguan political party

The Antigua National Party was a political party in Antigua and Barbuda. The only general elections it contested were those of 1956. Despite receiving 12.5% of the vote, they failed to win a seat.
