= Keithly Heath =

Antiguan politician

William Keithly Heath

President of the Senate of Antigua and Barbuda
- In office 1976–1980
- Preceded by: Clarence Addison Harney
- Succeeded by: Bradley Carrott

William Keithly Heath was an Antiguan and Barbudan politician and President of the Senate of Antigua and Barbuda.

He was a businessman. In July 1946, he was elected as an independent to the Legislative Council of Antigua in the elections before universal suffrage.

Heath was appointed President of the Senate of Antigua and Barbuda in 1976. He served as President of the Senate at least until the 1980 elections.

Heath was a prominent free-mason and grand inspector of the Leeward Islands lodge from 1961 to 1982, when he retired.

He died in early 1990s. Antigua Barbuda Post release a stamp for his honour in 1993.
