= Edmond Mansoor =

Antiguan and Barbudan politician

President of the Senate of Antigua and Barbuda
- In office 26 March 2004 – 5 January 2005
- Preceded by: Millicent Percival
- Succeeded by: Hazelyn Francis

Member of Senate of Antigua and Barbuda
- In office 5 January 2005 – 16 May 2014

Minister of State in the Office of The Prime Minister
- In office 16 March 2009 – 12 June 2014

Personal details
- Party: Antigua and Barbuda Labour Party (since 2024); United Progressive Party (until 2024)

Edmond Mansoor is an Antiguan and Barbudan politician and physician. He is the former senate president of the Upper House of Parliament in Antigua and Barbuda. He has also served as the Minister of State and Minister of Communication and Telecommunications.

== Senate career (2004-2014) ==
Mansoor was appointed to the Antiguan and Barbudan Senate in 2004 by Prime Minister Baldwin Spencer. Mansoor served as President of the Upper House of Parliament in Antigua and Barbuda between 26 March 2004 to 5 January 2005 after which he was appointed Minister of State. In 2005, he was appointed a Minister in the Office of the Prime Minister, charged with Broadcasting, Information and Telecommunications. He served as Minister of State till June 2014.

== Post-Senate (2014-) ==
On 25 August 2024, Mansoor resigned from his executive role in the United Progressive Party. On 7 September 2024, he announced he joined the Antigua and Barbuda Labour Party.
