= 1946 Antiguan general election =

- 26 July 1946

All 5 seats in the Legislative Council 3 seats needed for a majority
	First party
Party	ATLU
Seats won	5
Popular vote	7,737
Percentage	81.53%
Administrator before election
F. S. Harcourt
Subsequent Administrator
Leslie Stuart Greening

General elections were held in Antigua and Barbuda on 26 July 1946. The elections were held under a limited franchise and only those who owned property were permitted to stand for election to the legislature. The Antigua Trades and Labour Union (ATLU) chose five of its members who satisfied the property criteria to stand as labour representatives. All were elected as the union-backed candidates received 82% of the vote. Nationwide colonial elections had been suspended in 1898 due to concerns over too many black representatives being elected as well as a financial crisis affecting the plantocracy.

One of the five was union leader and future Prime Minister of Antigua and Barbuda Vere Bird, who first entered the Antigua and Barbuda legislature through a by-election in 1945.

== Results ==
The five union-backed candidates won their seats by large margins.

Party	Votes	%	Seats
ATLU-affiliated candidates	7,737	81.53	5
Other candidates	1,753	18.47	0
Total	9,490	100.00	5
Source: University of California

== Aftermath ==
Following the elections, Bird was chosen by the Governor of Antigua to sit on the Executive Council of the colony.
