= President of the Senate of Antigua and Barbuda =

- Coat of arms of Antigua and Barbuda
- Incumbent; Alincia Williams-Grant since 25 June 2014
- Style: The Honourable
- Term length: Five years
- Formation: 1 November 1981
- First holder: Novelle Richards
- Deputy: Deputy President of the Senate of Antigua and Barbuda
- Salary: 42,000 XCD annually

President of the Senate of Antigua and Barbuda is the presiding officer in the Senate of Antigua and Barbuda. Prior to conducting any other business, the Senate must elect a senator to serve as president when it convenes following a general election.

If the position of president becomes vacant at any point before the next dissolution of Parliament, the Senate must elect a new senator to serve in that capacity as soon as is practically possible. Prior to conducting any other business besides electing the President at the Senate's first session following a general election, the Senate shall elect a senator to serve as Vice-President. If the position of Vice-President becomes vacant at any point before the next dissolution of Parliament, the Senate shall, as soon as is practically possible, elect another senator to fill the position. A senator cannot be elected by the Senate to be President or Vice-President if they are also serving as a Minister or Parliamentary Secretary. When the Presidency is vacant, the Senate is not allowed to conduct any activity (except from the election of a President).

If the business before the Senate in that meeting makes the Attorney-General's presence desirable, the President, Vice-President, or other member presiding in the Senate may request that the Attorney-General attend that meeting. When such a request is made, the Attorney-General may participate in the meeting solely for the purpose of explaining the matters before the Senate in that meeting.

The president's annual salary is XCD 42,000.

== List of presidents ==
This is an incomplete list of the presidents of the Senate of Antigua and Barbuda:

Name	Took office	Left office
Hon. Novelle Richards	1967	1967
Hon. Dr. Luther Wynter	1967	1968
Hon. Clarence Addison Harney	1971	After June 1975
Hon. W. Keithly Heath	1976	After March 1980
Hon. Bradley Carrott	Before November 1980	18 February 1994
Hon. Millicent Percival	21 March 1994	26 February 2004
Hon. Edmond Mansoor	26 March 2004	5 January 2005
Hon. Hazelyn Francis	7 January 2005	16 May 2014
Hon. Alincia Williams-Grant	25 June 2014	Present

== Sources ==
This article incorporates public domain material from the Government of Antigua and Barbuda.
