= List of acts of the Parliament of Antigua and Barbuda from 2025 =

This is a list of acts of the Parliament of Antigua and Barbuda passed in 2025. Some legislation passed in Antigua and Barbuda before 1981 may be considered an act of the parliament of Antigua and Barbuda even if it was passed under the Parliament of Antigua or the Legislative Council of Antigua.

== List ==
Short title	Long title	Citation	Royal assent
Eastern Caribbean Deposit Insurance Corporation Agreement Act, 2015	An Act to provide for the implementation of the Agreement establishing the Eastern Caribbean Deposit Insurance Corporation and for related matters.	No. 12 of 2025	5 June 2025
Antigua and Barbuda College of Advanced Studies (ABCAS) Act, 2025	An Act to establish the Antigua and Barbuda College of Advanced Studies as an institution of higher education and for the teaching and training of persons in Antigua and Barbuda in the fields of study offered by the institution, to manage the institution and to provide for other matters connected therewith.	No. 11 of 2025	5 June 2025
Appropriation Act, 2025	An Act to provide for the services of Antigua and Barbuda for the year ending on the 31st day of December 2026.	No. 21 of 2025	18 December 2025
Architects (Profession) (Amendment) Act, 2025	An Act to amend the Architects (Professions) Act 2018 to clarify the definition of “practical experience” and to remove barriers to the free movement of architects from OECS Protocol Member States and for related matters.	No. 8 of 2025	7 March 2025
Automatic Exchange of Financial Account Information (Amendment) Act, 2025	An Act to amend the Automatic Exchange of Financial Account Information Act 2016, No. 11 of 2016, to strengthen the legal and regulatory framework relating to the global standard of automatic exchange of financial information, including the scope of financial information reported, the scope of account holders subject to reporting, and the scope of financial institutions required to report.	No. 5 of 2025	7 March 2025
Automatic Exchange of Financial Account Information (Amendment No. 2) Act, 2025	An Act to further amend the Automatic Exchange of Financial Account Information Act 2016, No. 11 of 2016, and for other connected purposes.	No. 20 of 2025	6 November 2025
Banking (Amendment) Act, 2025	An Act to amend the Banking Act 2015, No. 10 of 2015, and for other connected purposes.	No. 14 of 2025	5 June 2025
Base Erosion and Profit Shifting Act, 2025	An Act to provide for the implementation of the Base Erosion and Profit Shifting (BEPS) Actions under the OECD/G20 Inclusive Framework, including the 12 Actions agreed upon to address tax avoidance strategies by multinational enterprises, and to make provisions for other connected purposes.	No. 4 of 2025	7 March 2025
Borrowing Authorisation (2026 Budget) Act, 2025	An Act to authorize the borrowing of a sum of money to supplement the 2026 Budget and for other connected purposes.	No. 23 of 2025	18 December 2025
CARICOM Arrest Warrant Act, 2025	An Act to establish the procedure for issuing CARICOM Arrest Warrants, to put in place administrative and other procedures for the effective arrest and surrender of persons under the CARICOM Arrest Warrant, and to give effect to the CARICOM Arrest Warrant Treaty and for other connected and related purposes.	No. 16 of 2025	19 June 2025
Companies (Amendment) Act, 2025	An Act to amend the Companies Act 1995, No. 18 of 1995, and for other connected purposes.	No. 15 of 2025	5 June 2025
Constitution of Antigua and Barbuda (Amendment) Act, 2025	An Act to amend the Constitution of Antigua and Barbuda, as contained in Schedule 1 to the Antigua and Barbuda Constitution Order 1981, Cap. 23.	No. 22 of 2025	18 December 2025
Consumer Protection Act, 2025	An Act to provide for the promotion and protection of consumer interests in relation to the supply of goods and the provision of services; to ensure protection of life, health and safety of consumers; and to provide for the establishment of a Consumer Affairs Department and connected purposes.	No. 7 of 2025	7 March 2025
Corporación Andina de Fomento Act, 2025	An Act to provide for the membership of Antigua and Barbuda as a Shareholder Country in the Corporación Andina de Fomento and for other connected purposes.	No. 6 of 2025	7 March 2025
Cultural Heritage (Protection) Act, 2025	An Act for the protection of cultural heritage, encompassing tangible and intangible, land-based as well as submerged, movable as well as immovable objects and sites associated with historical events, persons of importance, architectural designs and construction of importance to the history and culture of Antigua and Barbuda, and for incidental and connected purposes.	No. 3 of 2025	7 March 2025
Eastern Caribbean Citizenship by Investment Regulatory Authority Agreement Act, 2025	An Act to give effect to and provide for the implementation of the Agreement establishing the Eastern Caribbean Citizenship by Investment Regulatory Authority (ECCIRA) and for related matters.	No. 18 of 2025	6 November 2025
Girl Guides Association (Incorporation) Act, 2025	An Act to incorporate the Girl Guides Association of Antigua and Barbuda.	No. 9 of 2025	7 March 2025
Magistrate's Code of Procedure (Amendment) Act, 2025	An Act to amend the Magistrate's Code of Procedure, Cap. 255.	No. 2 of 2025	7 March 2025
National Oversight Committee on Financial Action Act, 2025	An Act to provide for the establishment of a National Oversight Committee on Financial Action to coordinate and oversee the implementation of Antigua and Barbuda's legal and institutional framework for countering money laundering, terrorist financing, and the financing of proliferation of weapons of mass destruction, and to provide for related matters.	No. 17 of 2025	23 October 2025
National Spiritual Assembly of Baha'is of the Leeward Islands (Incorporation) Act, 2025	An Act to provide for the incorporation of the National Spiritual Assembly of the Bahá’ís of the Leeward Islands, to vest certain lands therein, and to provide for matters incidental thereto.	No. 10 of 2025	7 March 2025
Payment Systems and Services Act, 2025	An Act to provide for the licensing and regulation of payment service providers, the oversight of the payment system, and related matters.	No. 13 of 2025	19 June 2025
Tax Administration and Procedure (Amendment) Act, 2025	An Act to amend the Tax Administration and Procedure Act 2018, No. 12 of 2018, and for other connected purposes.	No. 19 of 2025	6 November 2025
Vehicles and Road Traffic (Amendment) Act, 2025	An Act to amend the Vehicles and Road Traffic Act, Cap. 460, and for other connected purposes.	No. 1 of 2025	7 March 2025
