= James Carlisle =

Governor-General of Antigua and Barbuda from 1993 to 2007

The Right Honourable Sir James Carlisle GCMG
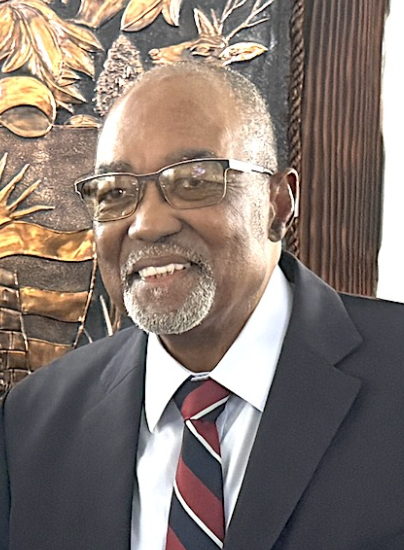
- Carlisle in 2024

2nd Governor-General of Antigua and Barbuda
- In office 10 June 1993 – 30 June 2007
- Monarch: Elizabeth II
- Prime Minister: Vere Cornwall Bird; Lester Bird; Baldwin Spencer
- Preceded by: Wilfred Jacobs
- Succeeded by: Louise Lake-Tack

Personal details
- Born: James Beethoven Carlisle; 5 August 1937 (age 89) Bolans, Presidency of Antigua
- Spouse: Lady Emma Carlisle
- Children: 2
- Education: University of Dundee
- Profession: Dentistry

Sir James Beethoven Carlisle, GCMG (born 5 August 1937) is an Antiguan politician and dentist who served as the second governor-general of Antigua and Barbuda from 1993 to 2007. Selected by Vere Cornwall Bird (the country's first prime minister), his term ended in June 2007, after 16 years in office.

== Early years ==
Carlisle was born 5 August 1937, in the village of Bolans, Antigua. He received his early schooling at Bolans Public School, before moving to the United Kingdom to continue his education at Northampton College of Advanced Technology. He then took a bachelor's degree in dentistry at the University of Dundee. In 1991, he graduated from the American School of Laser Dentistry.

== Dental career ==
Carlisle practised in both Antigua and Britain. Upon his return to Antigua in 1981 he went into private practice. He built this up and also undertook work as a dental officer in the public service.

With help from the ex-prime minister, Vere Bird, one of his patients, who offered the position of Governor-General to him, he assisted with the development of a Fluoride programme for children, and assisted the ex prime minister institute a free dental service. He is a member of the International Society of Laser Dentists and the British Dental Association.

== Military career ==
Carlisle was in the British Royal Air Force from 1961 to 1966. He was also commissioned in the Antigua and Barbuda Defence Force between 1983 and 1993. As Governor-General he was automatically appointed as Commander of the Antigua and Barbuda Defence Force.

== Political career ==
Carlisle involved himself in the local community. He was Chairman of the National Parks Authority, which he ran before he was nominated by the then prime minister as Governor-General of Antigua and Barbuda, taking office on 10 June 1993 As Governor-General Carlisle was the representative of the Queen, the country's head of state, taking all decisions which belonged to the Crown. In 1993, he was knighted, becoming Sir James. As Governor-General, Carlisle held the following positions:

- Grandmaster of four Antiguan Orders of Chivalry as Governor-General
- Chief Scout of the Antigua and Barbuda Branch of The Scout Association
- Patron of the Duke of Edinburgh's Award Scheme in Antigua and Barbuda
- Patron of the Renal Society of Antigua and Barbuda

== Honours ==
- Knight Grand Cross of the Order of St Michael and St George (GCMG), appointed November 1993, invested, July 1994.
- Knight of Justice - Order of St. John (KStJ)
- Honorary Doctor of Laws, Andrews University, Michigan, US

== Personal life ==
Carlisle is married to Emma Carlisle, who during her period as wife to the Governor-General took a leading role in raising funds from commercial sponsors for indigenous people in her homeland.

Carlisle is a Seventh-day Adventist. As such he did not carry out official duties on the Sabbath or serve alcohol to guests at official functions. This was a source of some controversy, by his own admission.

Government offices
| Preceded by Wilfred Jacobs | Governor-General of Antigua and Barbuda; 1993–2007 | Succeeded by Louise Lake-Tack |
