= Hazelyn Francis =

Antiguan politician

Dame Hazelyn Francis

President of the Senate of Antigua and Barbuda
- In office 7 January 2005 – 16 May 2014
- Preceded by: Edmond Mansoor
- Succeeded by: Alincia Williams-Grant

Personal details
- Born: July 23, 1943 (age 83)
- Party: United Progressive Party

Dame Hazelyn Francis DCN (born July 23, 1943) is a former politician, teacher, trade-union leader from Antigua and Barbuda, Vice-President and President of the Senate in Antigua and Barbuda from 2005 to 2014.

Francis served as president of the Antigua and Barbuda Union of Teachers from 1995 to 1998. On 27 March 2004 she was appointed to the Senate. She served as Vice-President of the Senate in 2004–05, and was elected President of the Senate on 7 January 2005.

On 28 October 2005, she was violently attacked, robbed, and raped in her home, and was briefly hospitalised as a result. The incident served to intensify the debate around high levels of crime and prompted a review of security arrangements for government officials.
