= Edmund Lake =

Antiguan politician

Member of the Legislative Council of Antigua and Parliament of Antigua
- In office 20 December 1951 – 5 December 1970
- Preceded by: Constituency established
- Succeeded by: Sydney Christian
- Constituency: St. John's City South and Barbuda (1951–1960); St. John's City South (1960–1970)

Personal details
- Party: Antigua and Barbuda Labour Party

Edmund Lake was an Antiguan Labour Party politician, who was elected as representative for St. John's City South and Barbuda in the 1951, 1956, 1960, and 1965 general elections.
