= Donald Christian (politician) =

Antiguan politician

Member of the House of Representatives
- In office 18 February 1976 – 20 February 1989
- Preceded by: Selwyn Walter
- Succeeded by: Baldwin Spencer

Personal details
- Party: Antigua and Barbuda Labour Party

Donald Christian was an Antiguan Labour Party politician, who was first elected as Member of Parliament for St. John's Rural West in the 1976 general election.
