= Wilfred Jacobs =

Royal representative of Antigua and Barbuda from 1967 to 1993

Sir Wilfred Ebenezer Jacobs GCMG KCVO OBE
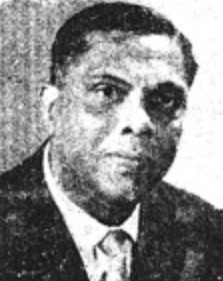

1st Governor-General of Antigua and Barbuda
- In office 1 November 1981 – 10 June 1993
- Monarch: Elizabeth II
- Prime Minister: Vere Bird
- Preceded by: Himself as Governor
- Succeeded by: Sir James Carlisle

1st Governor of Antigua
- In office 27 February 1967 – 31 October 1981
- Preceded by: David James Gardiner Rose as Administrator
- Succeeded by: Himself as Governor-General

Attorney General of the Leeward Islands
- In office 1949–1960

Personal details
- Born: 19 October 1919 Grenada
- Died: 11 March 1995 (aged 75)
- Spouse: Carmen
- Children: 3

Sir Wilfred Ebenezer Jacobs GCMG KCVO OBE (19 October 1919 – 11 March 1995) was an Antiguan administrator who served as the first governor-general of Antigua and Barbuda from 1981 to 1993. Prior to his tenure as governor-general he was the administrator of Antigua from 1966 to 1967.

== Early life and education ==
Wilfred Ebenezer Jacobs attended Codrington College.

== Career ==
Queen Elizabeth II appointed Jacobs as the Attorney General of the British Leeward Islands on 31 March 1959.

David Rose was succeeded as administrator of Antigua by Jacobs in 1966, and he held that position until its abolition in 1967. He became governor-general of Antigua in 1967, the first person to hold the position after the country gained its independence. On 1 November 1981, he was made a knight of the Order of St Michael and St George.

Riots broke out in Antigua for two days starting on 17 March 1968 due to labour union disputes between the Antigua Trades Labor Union and the Antigua Workers' Union. At least ten people were wounded in the riots. A state of emergency was declared by Jacobs on March 19 at the request of Premier Vere Bird's cabinet.

Jacobs suffered from poor health near the end of his term and underwent surgery in the United Kingdom in the 1990s. Sir James Carlisle was appointed to succeed him as governor-general. James Carlisle succeeded Jacobs as governor-general on 10 June 1993.

== Personal life ==
Jacobs married Carmen, with whom he had three children. Carmen was involved with a leper colony.

Jacobs died on 11 March 1995 after suffering from a terminal illness. A state funeral was held for Jacobs at St. John's Cathedral in St. John's.

== Works cited ==
- Banks, Arthur; Muller, Thomas, eds. (1998). Political Handbook of the World 1998. CSA Publications. ISBN 0933199139.
- Henige, David (1970). Colonial Governors from the Fifteenth Century to the Present. University of Wisconsin Press.

Government offices
New creation	Governor of Antigua and Barbuda; 1967–1981	Independence
New creation	Governor-General of Antigua and Barbuda; 1981–1991	Succeeded by Sir James Carlisle
