= J. L. E. Jeffrey =

Antiguan politician

J. L. E. Jeffrey OBE

Temporary member of the Legislative Council of Antigua
- In office 25 April 1952 – 4 July 1952
- Preceded by: Sydney Christian
- Succeeded by: Sydney Christian
- Constituency: Nominated

J. L. E. Jeffrey OBE was an Antiguan politician, who was appointed as a temporary member of the Legislative Council of Antigua between 25 April 1952 and 4 July 1952 while Sydney Christian was granted a leave of absence.
