= Christian Simon =

Antiguan politician

Member of the Legislative Council of Antigua
- In office 29 November 1960 – 1965
- Preceded by: Bradley Carrott
- Succeeded by: Bradley Carrott
- Constituency: St. Mary

Personal details
- Party: Antigua and Barbuda Labour Party

Christian Simon was an Antiguan Labour Party politician, who was first elected as representative for St. Mary in the 1960 general election. He also attempted to run on behalf of the party in the 1971 general election in St. Mary's South, in which he lost to Victor McKay.
