= Clarence Harney =

Antiguan politician

President of the Senate of Antigua and Barbuda
- In office 1971–1976
- Succeeded by: W. Keithly Heath

Personal details
- Born: 1902
- Died: ?
- Party: Progressive Labour Movement

Clarence Addison Harney was an Antiguan Progressive Labour Movement politician, who was the president of the Senate of Antigua and Barbuda between 1971 and 1976.

He was born 1902. He was called to bar, Inner Temple in 1940. He worked as the magistrate in Montserrat and Antigua, and as crown attorney in St Kitts and Dominica. He was an acting administrator of Dominica on various occasions.
