= Queen's Diamond Jubilee =

Queen's Diamond Jubilee may refer to:

- Diamond Jubilee of Queen Victoria in 1897
- Diamond Jubilee of Elizabeth II in 2012
