= Luther Wynter =

Antiguan politician

Member of the Legislative Council of Antigua
- In office 1 November 1956 – 29 October 1960
- Constituency: Nominated

Personal details
- Born: 15 September 1899
- Died: 1984 (aged 84–85)

Sir Luther Reginald Wynter was a Jamaican-Antiguan politician and medical doctor.

Wynter was born in Buff Bay, Jamaica on 15 September 1899. He worked as an ophthalmologist on Antigua.

Wynter served as a nominated member of the Legislative Council of Antigua between 1 November 1956 and 29 October 1960. He was again a nominated member of the Legislative Council of Antigua from 1965 to 1966, and a Senator and President of the Senate of Antigua from 1967 to 1968.

Wynter received OBE knighthood in 1962. He died in 1984.
