= Lionel A. Hurst =

Antiguan politician

Member of the Legislative Council of Antigua and Parliament of Antigua
- In office 20 December 1951 – 5 December 1970
- Preceded by: Constituency established
- Succeeded by: Constituency abolished
- Constituency: St. John's City North

Personal details
- Party: Antigua and Barbuda Labour Party

Lionel A. Hurst was an Antiguan Labour Party politician, who was elected as representative for St. John's City North in the 1951, 1956, 1960, and 1965 general elections.
