= Eustace Lake =

Antiguan politician (died 2026)

Eustace Lake MP

Member of the House of Representatives of Antigua and Barbuda
- In office 12 March 2009 – 26 February 2018
- Preceded by: Winston Williams
- Succeeded by: Daryll Matthew
- Constituency: St. John's Rural South

Personal details
- Died: 20 February 2026
- Party: Antigua and Barbuda Labour Party

Eustace Sylvester "Teco" Lake (died 20 February 2026) was an Antigua and Barbuda Labour Party politician, who was elected as Member of Parliament for St. John's Rural South in the 2009 and 2014 general elections. He died after a short illness on 20 February 2026.
