= Wilbert Sterling =

Antiguan politician

Wilbert Sterling MP

Member of the House of Representatives of Antigua and Barbuda
- In office 11 February 1971 – 31 January 1976
- Preceded by: Constituency established
- Succeeded by: Charlesworth Samuel
- Constituency: St. Luke

Personal details
- Party: Progressive Labour Movement

Wilbert Sterling was an Antiguan Progressive Labour Movement politician, who was elected as Member of Parliament for St. Luke in the 1971 general election.
