= Louise Lake-Tack =

Governor-General of Antigua and Barbuda from 2007 to 2014

The Right Honourable Dame Louise Lake-Tack GCMG DStJ
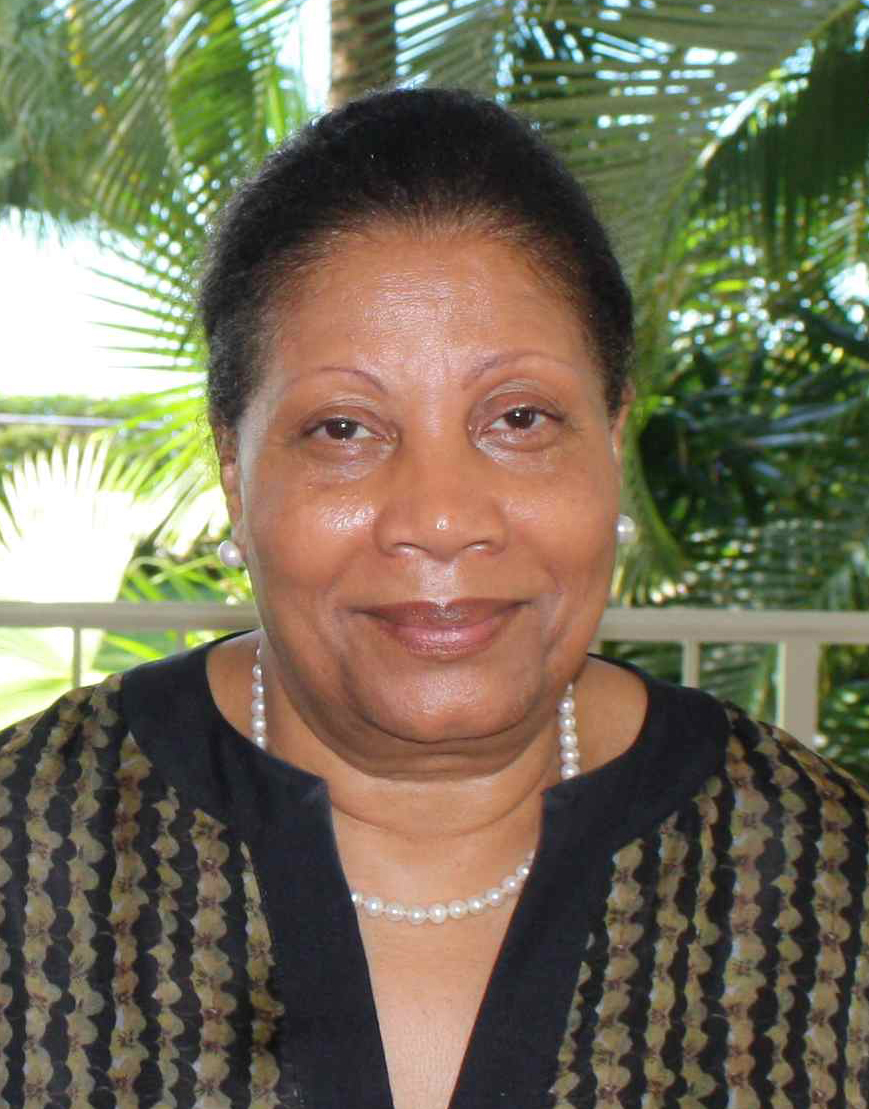

3rd Governor-General of Antigua and Barbuda
- In office 17 July 2007 – 13 August 2014
- Monarch: Elizabeth II
- Prime Minister: Baldwin Spencer; Gaston Browne
- Preceded by: James Carlisle
- Succeeded by: Rodney Williams

Personal details
- Born: 26 July 1944 (age 82) Saint Philip, Presidency of Antigua
- Education: City of Westminster College; University of West London; Open University; City University

Dame Louise Agnetha Lake-Tack (born 26 July 1944) who served as the third governor-general of Antigua and Barbuda from 2007 to 2014. She was the first woman to hold the office.

== Background and earlier career ==
Louise Lake-Tack was born in St. Philip Parish, Antigua in 1944. She was educated at Freetown Government School before attending the Antigua Girls High School in St. John's. After graduating she emigrated to the United Kingdom where she studied nursing at Charing Cross Hospital. Following the completion of her studies, she worked first at the National Heart Hospital and later at the Harley Street Clinic.

Lake-Tack later studied and graduated in law and subsequently served as a magistrate at both Marylebone and Horseferry Magistrate Courts. She also sat at Pocock Street Crown Court and Middlesex Crown Court to hear appeal cases from the lower courts. She served as a member of the Antigua and Barbuda National Association (London) for the 24 years preceding her appointment as Governor-General.

== Personal life ==
Lake-Tack is a widow and has two children.

== Governor-General ==
She took office as Governor-General of Antigua and Barbuda on 17 July 2007. She was the first woman to hold the office. On 14 August 2014, she was replaced by Sir Rodney Williams, who took office as the 4th Governor-General of Antigua and Barbuda.

== Controversy ==
Shortly before Dame Louise Lake-Tack retired from office, she under the powers of her office conferred certain national honours of Antigua and Barbuda on 19 people, including a knighthood on her own son and a medal for her gardener. These appointments were condemned as unlawful by the newly elected prime minister. The Governor-General derives powers under Section 22 of the national Constitution and acts as the monarch's viceregal representative with prerogative powers. The Governor-General is independent of the Prime Minister.

In making the honours, the Governor-General claimed that she acted under the prerogative powers. Further, the 2000 National Honours Act provided statutory authority for her independent nominations for the awards and that knighthoods can only be taken away by degradation warrant if the recipient acts in such a manner to bring the honour into disrepute. Dame Louise publicly explained the reasons for the honours; maintaining that the individuals whom she awarded had been invaluable to the office of Governor-General and consequently awarded.

== Post-political career ==
Former Governor-General Dame Louise Lake-Tack has not yet received the money that is owed to her despite the fact that it has been years since she was removed from office. In the meeting of the Cabinet that took place in October 2017, the government continued to maintain its stance that the amount she is requesting is excessively high. According to the most recent press statement released by the government after the Cabinet meeting, they continue to believe that Dame Louise Lake-Tack is asking for too much. According to the statement, the attorneys who are representing the state and the former governor-general are required to renegotiate the amount that she is asking for. According to the Governor and Governor-General's Emoluments and Pension Act, Dame Louise is exercising her right to make demands. According to this Act, a governor-general is eligible for a salary of just over $108,000 per year in addition to a duty free allowance of nearly $10,000 per year. Dame Louise held the position of governor-general for somewhere around seven years. After the government complained to the Queen that her then-viceregal representative was being uncooperative with the Labour Party administration, the money that was being requested became payable when she agreed to leave office in August 2014. In December 2014, Dame Louise took the government to court to seek compensation for the many times she had been unsuccessful in determining when and how she would be paid.

== Honours ==
On 16 October Lake-Tack was invested as Dame of the Venerable Order of St. John (DStJ), and on 13 November 2007, appointed as Dame Grand Cross of the Order of St. Michael and St. George (GCMG).

Government offices
Preceded by Sir James Carlisle	Governor-General of Antigua and Barbuda; 2007–2014	Succeeded by Sir Rodney Williams
