= Stephen Mendez =

Antiguan politician

Member of the Legislative Council of Antigua
- In office 1 November 1956 – 29 October 1960
- Constituency: Nominated

Stephen Roy Mendez was an Antiguan politician, who served as a nominated member of the Legislative Council of Antigua between 1 November 1956 and 29 October 1960.
