= Basil Peters =

Antiguan politician

Basil Peters MP

Member of the House of Representatives of Antigua and Barbuda
- In office 11 February 1971 – 31 January 1976
- Preceded by: Constituency established
- Succeeded by: John St. Luce
- Constituency: St. John's City East

Personal details
- Party: Progressive Labour Movement

Basil Peters was an Antiguan Progressive Labour Movement politician, who was elected as Member of Parliament for St. John's City East in the 1971 general election.

He died in April 2018 at the age of 82.
