= Cecil Hewlett =

Antiguan politician

Cecil Hewlett MP

Speaker of the House of Representatives of Antigua and Barbuda
- In office 11 February 1971 – November 1975
- Preceded by: Denfield Hurst
- Succeeded by: Casford Murray

Personal details
- Born: January 4, 1920 Antigua

Cecil E. Hewlett was an Antiguan politician and Speaker of the House of Representatives.

Hewlett was born on 4 January 1920 on Antigua. He was barrister of law in Gray's Inn, London. He served as Speaker of the House of Representatives from 11 February 1971 before resigning in November 1975. Hewlett left the post to serve on the West Indies Associated States Supreme Court. Hewlett was also a lawyer who practiced before said court. He also served in the legal service of Ghana. Hewlett presided over the 5th legislature of Antigua and Barbuda, the first legislature in Antiguan and Barbudan history that was not controlled by the Labour Party.
