= Speaker of the House of Representatives (Antigua and Barbuda) =

Speaker of the House of Representatives of Antigua and Barbuda is the presiding officer in the House of Representatives of Antigua and Barbuda. Prior to conducting any other business, the House must elect a Speaker at its first session following a general election. If the position of Speaker becomes vacant at any point before the next dissolution of Parliament, the House must elect a replacement as soon as is practically possible. The Speaker may be chosen from among House members or from among individuals who are not House members but are eligible to serve in that capacity. Before conducting any other business other than electing the Speaker during the first meeting following a general election, the House shall elect a member to serve as Deputy Speaker. If the position of Deputy Speaker becomes vacant at any point prior to the next dissolution of Parliament, the House shall, as soon as is practically possible, elect another member to fill the vacancy. A minister or parliamentarian cannot be elected as the speaker or deputy speaker of the house by the house. When the position of Speaker is open, the House may not conduct any business (except from electing a Speaker).

When the House reconvenes following any dissolution of Parliament, or if he ceases to be a citizen, if any circumstances arise that would render him ineligible for election as a member of the House under any of the provisions of Section 39 of the Constitution, a person shall resign from the office of Speaker in the case of a Speaker elected from among persons who are not members of the House. Speakers chosen from among the members of the House may lose their position if they stop being members of the House, with the exception that the Speaker shall not resign from their position upon the dissolution of Parliament simply because they have ceased to be members until the first meeting of the House following the dissolution, or if they are appointed as a Minister or Parliamentary Secretary.

If the Speaker or Deputy Speaker is required to stop acting as a member of the House pursuant to section 41(2) of the Constitution, he must also stop acting in that capacity as Speaker or Deputy Speaker, as applicable. Until he leaves the House or resumes acting in that capacity, the following actions must be taken: in the case of the Speaker, by the Deputy Speaker or, in the event that the Deputy Speaker's position is vacant or the Deputy Speaker is required to stop serving as a member of the House under section 41(2) of the Constitution, by any other member of the House that the House may choose for the purpose (who is not a Minister or Parliamentary Secretary). The Speaker must also resume performing his duties as Speaker or Deputy Speaker, as appropriate, if he resumes doing them as a member of the House in accordance with section 41(2) of the Constitution.

The speaker's annual salary is XCD 60,000.

== Speakers of the Legislative Council ==
#	Name	Took office	Left office	Notes
1	Alec Lovelace	? - 1957	1958	
2	Ian Turbott	1958	1963	
3	Denfield W. Hurst	1963	27 February 1967	

== Speakers of the House of Representatives ==
#	Name	Took office	Left office	Notes
1	Hon. Denfield W. Hurst	27 February 1967	5 December 1970	
2	Hon. Cecil E. Hewlett	11 February 1971	November 1975	
3	Hon. Casford Llewellyn Murray	18 February 1976	18 February 1994	
4	Hon. Bridget Harris	21 March 1994	26 August 2004	
5	Hon. Giselle Isaac-Arindell	29 August 2004	16 May 2014	
6	Sir Gerald Owen Anderson Watt, KC	25 June 2014	18 November 2024	
7	Hon. Osbert Richard Frederick	18 November 2024	present	

== Sources ==
This article incorporates public domain material from the Government of Antigua and Barbuda.
