= Alexander Moody-Stuart (politician) =

Antiguan politician

Member of the Legislative Council of Antigua
- In office 20 December 1951 – 29 October 1960
- Constituency: Nominated

Alexander Moody-Stuart was an Antiguan politician, who served as a nominated member of the Legislative Council of Antigua between 20 December 1951 and 29 October 1960. He was also a trade unionist subject to controversy in the 1951 Antiguan protests.
