= Bradley Carrott =

Antiguan politician (1920–2001)

Bradley Theodore Carrott

President of the Senate of Antigua and Barbuda
- In office 1980 – 18 February 1994
- Preceded by: W. Keithly Heath
- Succeeded by: Millicent Percival

Personal details
- Born: 1920
- Died: 2001 (aged 80–81)
- Party: Antigua and Barbuda Labour Party

Sir Bradley Carrott was an Antiguan and Barbudan politician and a long-term President of the Senate of Antigua and Barbuda.

Carrott was born on Antigua in 1920. He was a carpenter by profession. He was an executive in Antigua Trades and Labour Union. He joined the Antigua and Barbuda Labour Party.

Carrott was elected as a member of the Legislative Council of Antigua in 1951, and Executive Council of Antigua. He represented Saint Mary constituency from 1951 to 1960 in the Legislative Council of Antigua. He was a minister without portfolio from 1956 to 1960. He was elected as a senator in the Senate of West Indies Federation. By 1969 he was a member of the House of Representatives, and minister of public works.

By 1979, Carrott was an appointed member of the Senate of Antigua and Barbuda. He was President of the Senate from 1980 to 18 February 1994.

Carrott was given a state funeral in 2001.
