= Sydney Christian (politician) =

Antiguan politician

Member of the Legislative Council of Antigua
- In office 20 December 1951 – November 1954
- Constituency: Nominated

Sydney Christian was an Antiguan politician, who was a nominated member of the Legislative Council of Antigua between 20 December 1951 and November 1954 when he resigned to join the supreme court. Between 25 April 1952 and 4 July 1952, Christian was granted a leave of absence and J. L. E. Jeffrey temporarily took his seat.
