= Geoffrey Scotland =

Antiguan politician

Geoffrey Scotland MP

Member of the House of Representatives of Antigua and Barbuda
- In office 11 February 1971 – 31 January 1976
- Preceded by: George Sheppard
- Succeeded by: Vere Bird Jr.
- Constituency: St. John's Rural South

Personal details
- Party: Progressive Labour Movement

Geoffrey Scotland was an Antiguan Progressive Labour Movement politician, who was elected as Member of Parliament for St. John's Rural South in the 1971 general election.
