= Selwyn Walter =

Antiguan politician

Selwyn Walter MP

Member of the House of Representatives of Antigua and Barbuda
- In office 11 February 1971 – 31 January 1976
- Preceded by: Constituency established
- Succeeded by: Donald Christian
- Constituency: St. John's Rural West

Personal details
- Party: Progressive Labour Movement

Selwyn Walter was an Antiguan Progressive Labour Movement politician, who was elected as Member of Parliament for St. John's Rural West in the 1971 general election.
