= St. John's Rural South =

Parliamentary constituency in Antigua and Barbuda

- Constituency for the Parliament of Antigua and Barbuda
- Polling divisions: 3
- Electorate: 4,041 (2026)

Current constituency
- Party: ABLP
- Member: Daryll Matthew

St. John's Rural South, also called Rural South is a parliamentary constituency located in Saint John, Antigua and Barbuda. The constituency is currently represented by Daryll Matthew.

== Polling districts ==
Rural South has three polling districts, "A", "B", and "C". Polling district "A" is composed primarily of Ottos and Radio Range. Polling district "B" is composed primarily of Desouza Road. Polling district "C" is composed primarily of Nut Grove and Golden Grove. In the 2023 general elections, polling district "A" primarily supported the ABLP. Polling district "B" also supported the ABLP. Meanwhile, polling district "C" only supported the ABLP by a small margin, with one polling station voting primarily in favour of the UPP.

== Electoral history ==
=== Voting trends ===
Party	1971	1976	1980	1984	1989	1994	1999	2004	2009	2014	2018	2023	2026
ALP	33.69%	50.51%	59.31%	71.81%	74.86%	64.19%	59.27%	44.36%	51.57%	59.84%	62.53%	56.04%	60.71%
UPP	-	-	-	28.19%	23.39%	31.89%	37.94%	55.64%	48.43%	39.08%	31.43%	42.26%	39.29%
PLM	64.27%	49.49%	28.19%	-	-	-	-	-	-	-	-	-	-
Others	2.04%	0.00%	12.50%	0.00%	1.75%	3.92%	2.79%	0.00%	0.00%	1.08%	1.58%	1.17%	0.00%
Valid	1,321	1,877	1,499	1,270	1,659	1,684	2,114	2,687	2,682	2,587	2,402	2,528	2,400
Invalid	17	14	15	4	16	5	9	15	8	10		13	17
Total	1,338	1,891	1,514	1,274	1,675	1,689	2,123	2,702	2,690	2,597		2,541	2,417
Registered	2,526	2,010	2,058	2,247	2,981	3,326	3,974	3,039	3,523	2,924		3,910	4,041
Turnout	52.97%	94.08%	73.57%	56.70%	56.19%	50.78%	53.42%	88.91%	76.36%	88.82%		64.99%	59.81%

== Members of parliament ==
Year	Winner	Party	% Votes
1971	Geoffrey Scotland	PLM	64.27%
1976	Vere Bird Jr.	ALP	50.51%
1980	Vere Bird Jr.	ALP	59.31%
1984	Vere Bird Jr.	ALP	71.81%
1989	Vere Bird Jr.	ALP	74.86%
1994	Vere Bird Jr.	ALP	64.19%
1999	Vere Bird Jr.	ALP	59.27%
2004	Winston Vincent Williams	UPP	55.64%
2009	Eustace Lake	ALP	51.57%
2014	Eustace Lake	ABLP	59.84%
2018	Daryll Matthew	ABLP	63.48%
2023	Daryll Matthew	ABLP	56.04%
2026	Daryll Matthew	ABLP	60.71%
