= Ernest Williams (politician) =

Antiguan politician

Member of the Legislative Council and the House of Representatives
- In office 20 December 1951 – 29 March 1984
- Preceded by: constituency established
- Succeeded by: Rodney Williams
- Constituency: St. Paul

Personal details
- Party: Antigua and Barbuda Labour Party

Ernest Emmanuel Williams was an Antiguan Labour Party politician, who was first elected as representative for St. Paul in the 1951 general election. He was the father of governor-general Rodney Williams.

In December 1950, he was listed as being a Swetes resident and the chairperson of the Swetes, Buckleys, and John Hughes village council.
