= Gerald Watt =

Antiguan politician and cabinet minister (1938–2025)

Sir Gerald Watt KCN KC

6th Speaker of the House of Representatives of Antigua and Barbuda
- In office 25 June 2014 – 18 November 2024
- Preceded by: Giselle Isaac-Arindell
- Succeeded by: Osbert Frederick

Personal details
- Born: 19 December 1938
- Died: 13 December 2025 (aged 86)

Sir Gerald Owen Anderson Watt KCN KC (19 December 1938 – 13 December 2025) was an Antiguan politician and cabinet minister. Watt was the Speaker of the House of Representatives from 25 June 2014 until 18 November 2024.

== Political career ==
Watt represented St. John's Rural East in parliament from 1971 until 1976 and was a onetime chairman of the Antigua & Barbuda Electoral Commission. Watt also served as attorney general (1971–1976) during his time as Minister of National Security, Labour, and Legal Affairs.

=== 2023 speaker election ===
Following the nomination of three candidates, the Speaker of the House of Representatives was chosen in a secret ballot in 2023 for the first time in the history of the nation. Nominations from the floor included former prime minister Baldwin Spencer, lawyer Sherrie-Ann Bradshaw, and Watt. Bradshaw received a nomination from the Leader of the Opposition in Parliament, Jamale Pringle for Spencer, Watt from Prime Minister Gaston Browne, and independent candidate Asot Michael for Bradshaw.

=== 2023 allegations of partisanship ===
The United Progressive Party (UPP) considered a vote of no confidence against Watt. The leader of the UPP, Jamale Pringle, first declared that he would bring a motion forward in July 2023. Allegations of political prejudice and alleged maltreatment of opposition MPs, particularly Asot Michael of St. Peter, who was suspended for three sittings on 18 May 2023, were the main causes of the allegations.

In September 2024, Watt announced his intention to retire at the end of the parliamentary session.

== Views ==
=== Crime ===
Watt supported arming police officers with tasers.

== Personal life and death ==
Watt was born on 19 December 1938, and died on 13 December 2025, at the age of 86.
