= 1956 Antiguan general election =

- 1 November 1956

All 8 elected seats in the Legislative Council 5 seats needed for a majority
- Turnout: 57.02% (▼13.31pp)
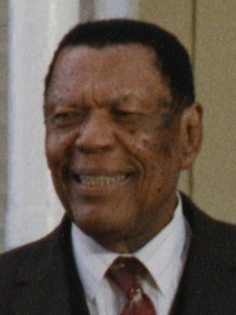
	First party
Leader	Vere Bird
Party	ALP
Seats won	8
Seat change	Steady
Popular vote	5,509
Percentage	86.69%
Swing	▼0.71pp
- Results by constituency

General elections were held in Antigua and Barbuda on 1 November 1956. The Antigua Labour Party retained all eight elected seats and the party's leader Vere Bird became Minister of Trade and Production after a ministerial system of government was established. Voter turnout was 57%.

== Results ==
Party	Votes	%	Seats	+/–
Antigua Labour Party	5,509	86.69	8	0
Antigua National Party	797	12.54	0	New
Post Union	49	0.77	0	New
Total	6,355	100.00	8	0
Valid votes	6,355	97.77		
Invalid/blank votes	145	2.23		
Total votes	6,500	100.00		
Registered voters/turnout	11,400	57.02		
Source: Nohlen
