= Donald Sheppard =

Antiguan politician

Donald Sheppard MP

Member of the Legislative Council and House of Representatives of Antigua and Barbuda
- In office 20 December 1951 – 31 January 1976
- Preceded by: Robin Yearwood
- Succeeded by: constituency established
- Constituency: St. Philip/St. Peter (1951–1970); St. Philip North (1971–1976)

Personal details
- Party: Antigua and Barbuda Labour Party

Donald Montgomery Sheppard was an Antiguan Labour Party politician, who was first elected as councillor for St. Peter/St. Philip in the 1951 general election. He later served as representative for St. Philip North.
