= Denfield Hurst =

Antiguan and Barbudan politician (born 1910)

Denfield Wilberforce Hurst

1st Speaker of the House of Representatives of Antigua and Barbuda
- In office 27 February 1967 – 5 December 1970
- Succeeded by: Cecil E. Hewlett

Personal details
- Born: 1910
- Party: Antigua and Barbuda Labour Party

Denfield Wilberforce Hurst (born 1910, date of death unknown) was an Antiguan and Barbudan politician who was speaker of the House of Representatives.

He was a member of Antigua Labour Party.

== Life and career ==
Hurst was born in 1910. He was a qualified accountant, and worked as a clerk in the civil service.

In December 1950, Hurst was listed as being a resident of Clare Hall and the chairperson of the St. Johnston and Clare Hall village council.

He was elected to the Legislative Council of Antigua in 1951. He represented the constituency of St. George (and later St. John's Rural North) from 1951 to 1971, and later St. John's Rural North from 1971 to 1976. He was first speaker of the Legislative Council from 1963 to 27 February 1967, and then continued as the speaker of the House of Representatives until December 1970.

In 1976, Hurst was appointed the head of Social Security.
