= Antigua Trades and Labour Union =

Trade union

ATLU
- Antigua Trades and Labour Union
- Founded: 16 January 1939
- Headquarters: St. John's, Antigua and Barbuda
- Location: Antigua and Barbuda
- Members: 7000
- Key people: Bernard de Nully, president (since 26 September 2023)

The Antigua Trades and Labour Union (ATLU) is the national trade union of Antigua and Barbuda. It was formed in 1939 and is closely related to the Antigua Labour Party. It has a membership of 7,000 and is led by Wigley George as president.

== History ==
The organization, whose first president was Reginald Stevens, was first formally registered in 1940, after a new changed trade union law that was installed in December 1939. Despite the increase of wages, the wage was initially not sufficient for the subsistence of the residences considering the inflation that was perceived by the residents, and strikes for higher wages continued in the 1940s. After the war, however, the union gained political success as they won a seat in the legislative council and the political committee. In 1967, the Antigua Workers' Union broke out from the group becoming a rival group, and the political parties Antigua and Barbuda Labour Party (ALP) and Progressive Labour Movement (PLM) was born from it.

== See also ==
- List of trade unions
