= 1951 Antiguan general election =

- 20 December 1951

All 8 elected seats in the Legislative Council 5 seats needed for a majority
- Turnout: 70.33%
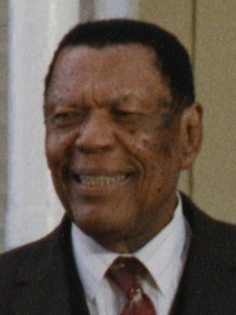
	First party
Leader	Vere Bird
Party	ALP
Seats won	8
Seat change	New
Popular vote	4,182
Percentage	87.40%

General elections were held in Antigua and Barbuda on 20 December 1951. The election was the first in Antigua and Barbuda to be held under universal suffrage. Vere Bird formed the Antigua Labour Party in 1951 and led the party to victory, winning all eight elected seats on the legislative council. Voter turnout was 70%.

== Results ==
Party	Votes	%	Seats
Antigua Labour Party	4,182	87.40	8
Independents	603	12.60	0
Total	4,785	100.00	8
Valid votes	4,785	98.80	
Invalid/blank votes	58	1.20	
Total votes	4,843	100.00	
Registered voters/turnout	6,886	70.33	
Source: Nohlen
