= Governor-General of Antigua and Barbuda =

Representative of the monarch

- Emblem

- Flag of the governor-general

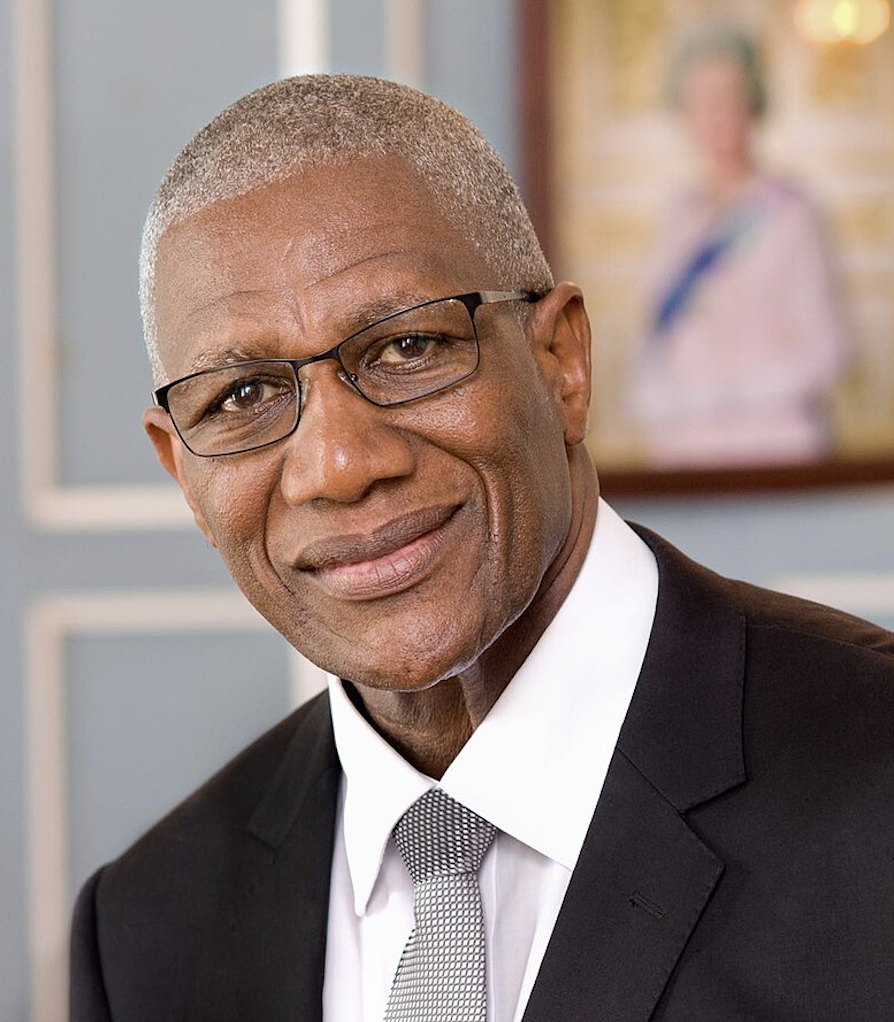
- Incumbent; Rodney Williams since 14 August 2014
- Viceroy
- Style: His Excellency
- Abbreviation: GG
- Residence: Government House
- Appointer: Monarch of Antigua and Barbuda on the advice of the prime minister
- Term length: At His Majesty's pleasure
- Precursor: Governor of Antigua
- Formation: 1 November 1981
- First holder: Sir Wilfred Jacobs
- Deputy: Deputy Governor-General
- Salary: 108,630 XCD annually
- Website: https://gg.gov.ag/

The governor-general of Antigua and Barbuda is the representative of the monarch of Antigua and Barbuda, currently Charles III. The governor-general is nominated by the prime minister, and appointed by the monarch. The governor-general exercises the powers of the monarch, and thus appoints ministers, senators, judges, and ambassadors; gives royal assent to legislation; and issues writs for election. The governor-general also exercises the powers of the commander-in-chief of the Antigua and Barbuda Defence Force. The governor-general serves at His Majesty's pleasure, although in practice is usually removed following the election of a new party into power.

In addition to their legal responsibilities, the governor-general also has many community and ceremonial duties including delivering the speech from the throne at the state opening of Parliament, accepting letters of credence from foreign ambassadors, distributing various honours and decorations, and representing the state at official events. In general, the governor-general observes the conventions of the Westminster system and responsible government, maintaining political neutrality, and has to always act only on the advice of the prime minister. The governor-general is supported by a staff headed by the official secretary to the governor-general.

The position of governor-general was established when Antigua and Barbuda gained independence on 1 November 1981. Since independence, four people have served as governor-general–all Antiguan residents, and three of them being men. In practice, the governor-general has been viewed as a de facto head of state.

== History ==
Prior to the establishment of the position of governor-general under the Constitution of Antigua and Barbuda, Antigua and Barbuda was administered by the Governor of Antigua, a position first established in 1632. In 1671, the position was replaced by a lieutenant governor with the establishment of the British Leeward Islands. From 1747 until 1816, the Leeward governor directly administered the archipelago. The position of Governor of Antigua was revived in 1816, and in 1833 the Governor of Antigua became the Governor of the Leeward Islands ex officio. The positions were merged in 1872, and in 1936, the position of administrator replaced the role. Upon the establishment of the Associated State of Antigua in 1967, the governorship was revived.

Since the position's establishment, the prime minister has nominated the governor-general shortly after their assumption of office. A notable exception was Louise Lake-Tack, who was appointed three years after Baldwin Spencer assumed the premiership. Lake-Tack was later removed from office by the Gaston Browne administration, after the government requested her removal due to her refusing to work with the administration. Since then, the governor-general has rarely exercised his or her powers without the advice of the government.

== Appointment ==
Any citizen of Antigua and Barbuda may be appointed as governor-general by the monarch. There is no set term for the governor-general, and the governor-general serves at His Majesty's pleasure, meaning the monarch holds the right to dismiss the governor-general at any time. If there is a vacancy in the position, the monarch is the only person who may fill that vacancy. In 2007, there was a vacancy in the position after the term of Sir James Carlisle ended, and in 2014, the government successfully appealed to the monarch that Louise Lake-Tack be removed from office due to her being "uncooperative".

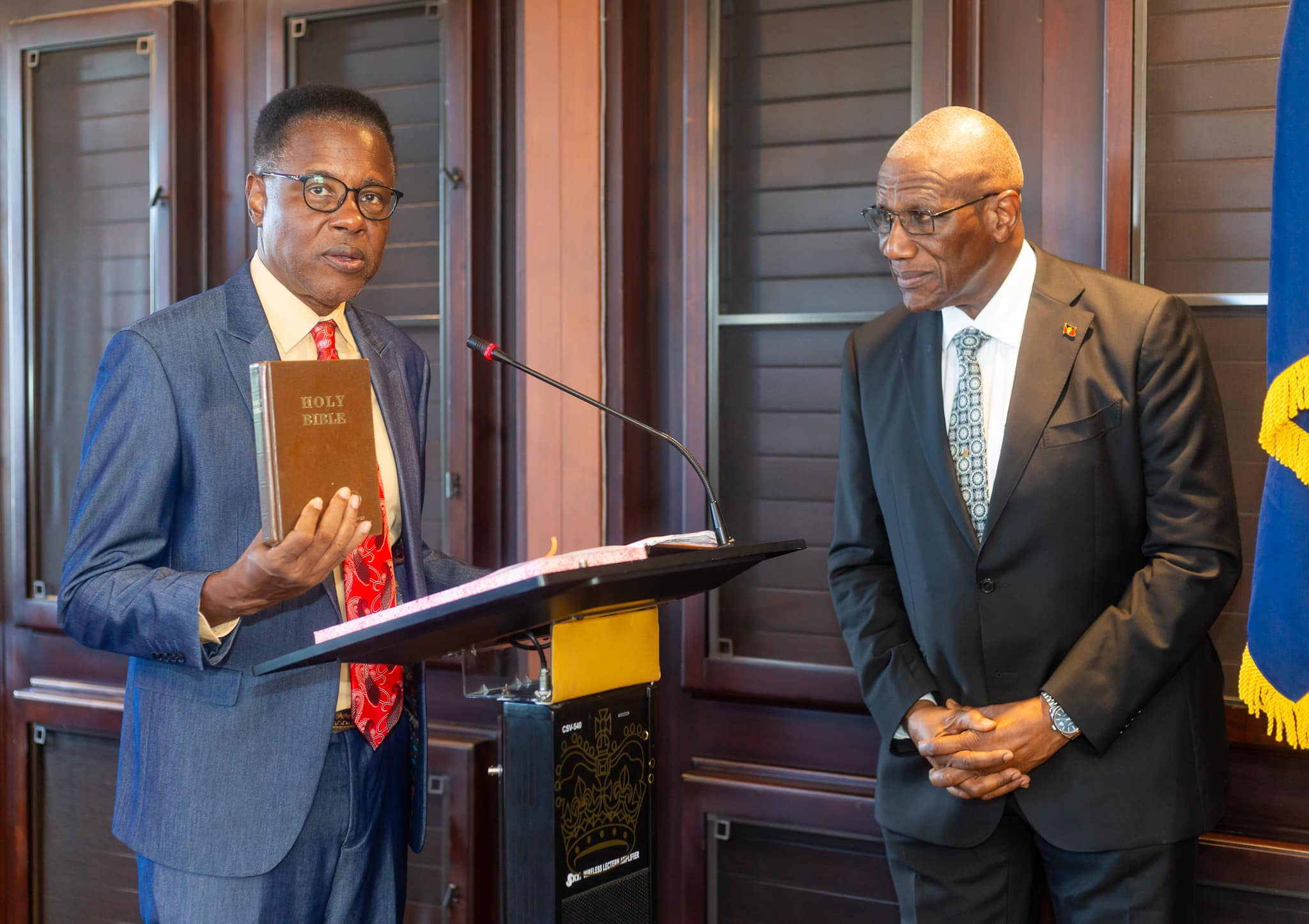
Rodney Williams swearing in Dean Jonas as ambassador-at-large

== Constitutional role ==
The governor-general has various responsibilities under the Constitution of Antigua and Barbuda. The governor-general exercises executive authority on behalf of the monarch, whom all executive powers are vested in.

=== Role in parliament ===
The governor-general appoints all members of the Senate. Ten appointments require the advice of the prime minister, one additional appointment must be a Barbuda resident on the advice of the prime minister, one requires the advice of the Barbuda Council, four require the advice of the leader of the opposition, and one may be appointed under his or her discretion. The governor-general may also declare a seat vacant with the advice of the person that's advice was required to appoint them, or if the Barbuda resident senator ceases to be a resident of Barbuda.

All bills passed by Parliament must receive royal assent from the governor-general on behalf of the monarch. The governor-general may only refuse to assent if they deem the bill unconstitutional. The governor-general may prorogue Parliament by proclamation. After a consultation with the prime minister, the governor-general may dissolve Parliament. The governor-general may also dissolve Parliament if a vote of no-confidence passes and the prime minister does not resign after seven days or request a dissolution of Parliament. If Parliament is dissolved, the governor-general may prorogue the previous Parliament with the advice of the prime minister in an emergency. The governor-general may choose the date of a general election within three months after a dissolution of Parliament. As soon as possible after a general election, the governor-general must appoint the seventeen senators.

The governor-general chooses the boundaries of parliamentary constituencies by an order. However, at least one these constituencies must be located within Barbuda. The governor-general also appoints various members of the Constituencies Boundaries Commission with the advice of the prime minister and leader of the opposition. The governor-general, through a notice in the Gazette, may also appoint the Supervisor of Elections.

=== Role in the executive ===
The governor-general may appoint the prime minister, who must be a member of parliament with the confidence of the majority of members of the House of Representatives, in usual circumstances the leader of the majority party. All other ministers must also be appointed by the governor-general with the prime minister's advice. Ministries may be created by acts of Parliament, or, if delegated, by the governor-general under the prime minister's advice. The governor-general may assign ministers a portfolio. The governor-general may also appoint parliamentary secretaries, attorneys-general, and certain members of the Advisory Committee on the Prerogative of Mercy.

The governor-general may grant pardons, respites, or order less severe punishments to criminals. The governor-general also must appoint the director of public prosecutions under the advice of the Judicial and Legal Services Commission, in addition to various other government commissioners.

== List of governors-general ==
The following is a list of people who have served as governor-general of Antigua and Barbuda since independence in 1981.

Denotes acting governors-general

No.	Portrait	Name (Birth–Death)	Term of office			Monarch (Reign)
No.	Portrait	Name (Birth–Death)	Took office	Left office	Time in office	Monarch (Reign)
1		Sir Wilfred Jacobs (1919–1995)	1 November 1981	10 June 1993	11 years, 221 days	Elizabeth II (1981–2022)
2		Sir James Carlisle (b. 1937)	10 June 1993	30 June 2007	14 years, 20 days	Elizabeth II (1981–2022)
Vacant (30 June – 17 July 2007)						Elizabeth II (1981–2022)
3		Dame Louise Lake-Tack (b. 1944)	17 July 2007	14 August 2014	7 years, 28 days	Elizabeth II (1981–2022)
4		Sir Rodney Williams (b. 1947)	14 August 2014	Incumbent	12 years, 24 days	
4		Sir Rodney Williams (b. 1947)	14 August 2014	Incumbent	12 years, 24 days	Charles III (2022–present)

== Timeline ==
This is a graphical lifespan timeline of the governors-general of Antigua and Barbuda. They are listed in order of first assuming office.

The following chart lists governors-general by lifespan (living governors-general on the green line), with the years outside of their governor-generalship in beige.

The following chart shows governors-general by their age (living governors-general in green), with the years of their governor-generalship in blue.

== See also ==
- Prime Minister of Antigua and Barbuda
- List of colonial governors and administrators of Antigua
