= Rodney Williams =

Governor-General of Antigua and Barbuda since 2014

His Excellency the Right Honourable Sir Rodney Williams GCMG KGN KStJ
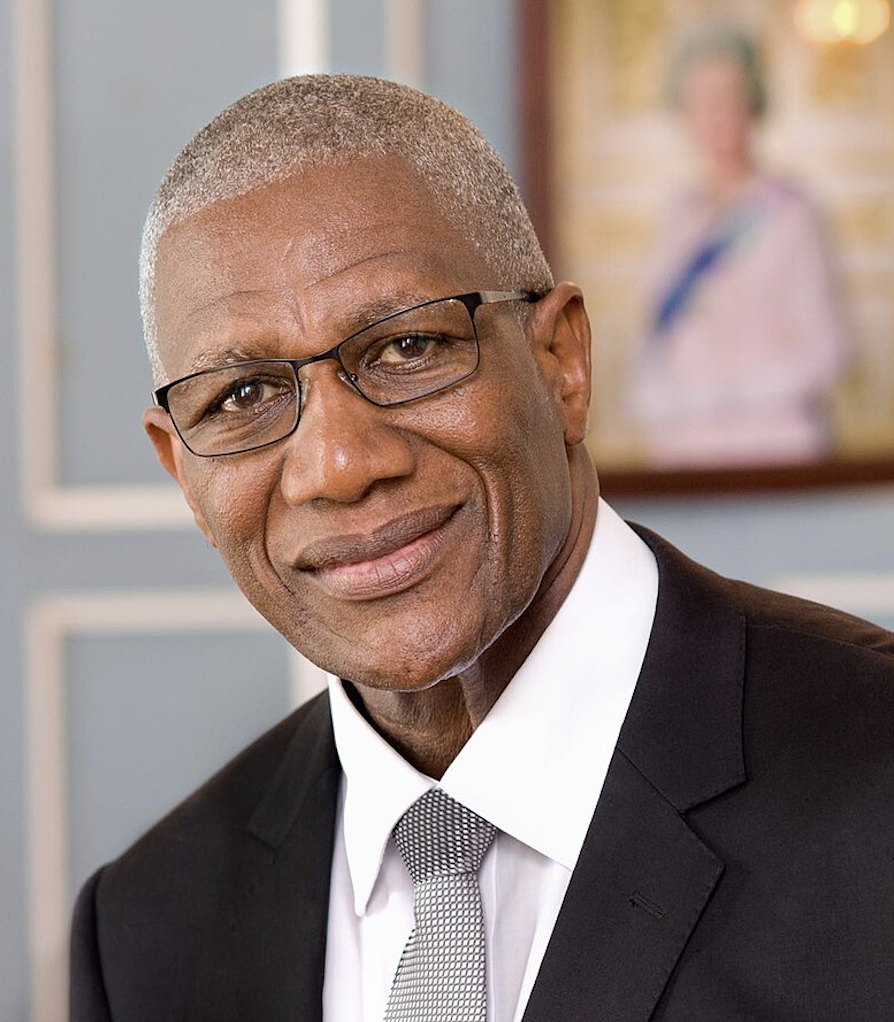
- Official portrait, c. 2015

4th Governor-General of Antigua and Barbuda
- Incumbent
- Assumed office 14 August 2014
- Monarchs: Elizabeth II; Charles III
- Prime Minister: Gaston Browne
- Deputy: Clare Roberts
- Preceded by: Louise Lake-Tack

Personal details
- Born: 2 November 1947 (age 79) Swetes, Presidency of Antigua
- Party: Labour Party
- Spouse(s): Sandra, Lady Williams
- Education: University of the West Indies
- Website: https://gg.gov.ag

Sir Rodney Errey Lawrence Williams, GCMG, KGN, KStJ (born 2 November 1947) is an Antiguan politician who is the fourth and current governor-general of Antigua and Barbuda, having previously served as Minister for Education, Culture and Technology and as a Member of Parliament until 2004.

== Early life ==
Rodney is the son of Ernest Emmanuel Williams, the former Antigua Labour Party (ALP) parliamentary representative for the St Paul constituency and Irene B. Williams, a professional educator in Antigua and Barbuda.

== Education ==
Williams attended the Antigua Grammar School in St. John's, upon graduating he taught at his alma mater for a year. He then studied medicine at the University of the West Indies, Mona, where he received his MBBS degree in Medicine and Surgery in 1976. From 1978, after completing his Internship at the Queen Elizabeth Hospital in Barbados, he pursued his private medical practice in Antigua & Barbuda.

== Early career ==
Rodney entered politics in 1984 as the Member of Parliament for the St Paul constituency, which had been previously represented by his father. Between 1992 and 2004, he served in the cabinet as a minister, holding variously or jointly the portfolios of education, culture, technology, economic development, tourism, and environment. He represented St Paul up to 2004 when he lost his seat in the 2004 general election, when his Antigua Labour Party lost to the United Progressive Party.

== Minister of Education, Culture and Technology ==
After the Antigua Labour Party's victory at the 1994 General Elections, Prime Minister Lester Bird appointed Williams as Minister of Education, Culture and Technology. He would retain this post until the end of his political career in 2004.

William's most controversial decision while being Minister of Education was his decision to introduce to Parliament the Board of Education Act, which introduced the Education Levy. The role of this statutory body was to provide finances for the stationery and physical supplies needed by public schools across the country. When the Bill was first tabled in the House of Representatives opposition forces marched in the high streets of St. John's, the capital city.

== Governor-General ==
Viceregal styles of Sir Rodney Williams (2014–present)
- Reference style: His Excellency
- Spoken style: Your Excellency

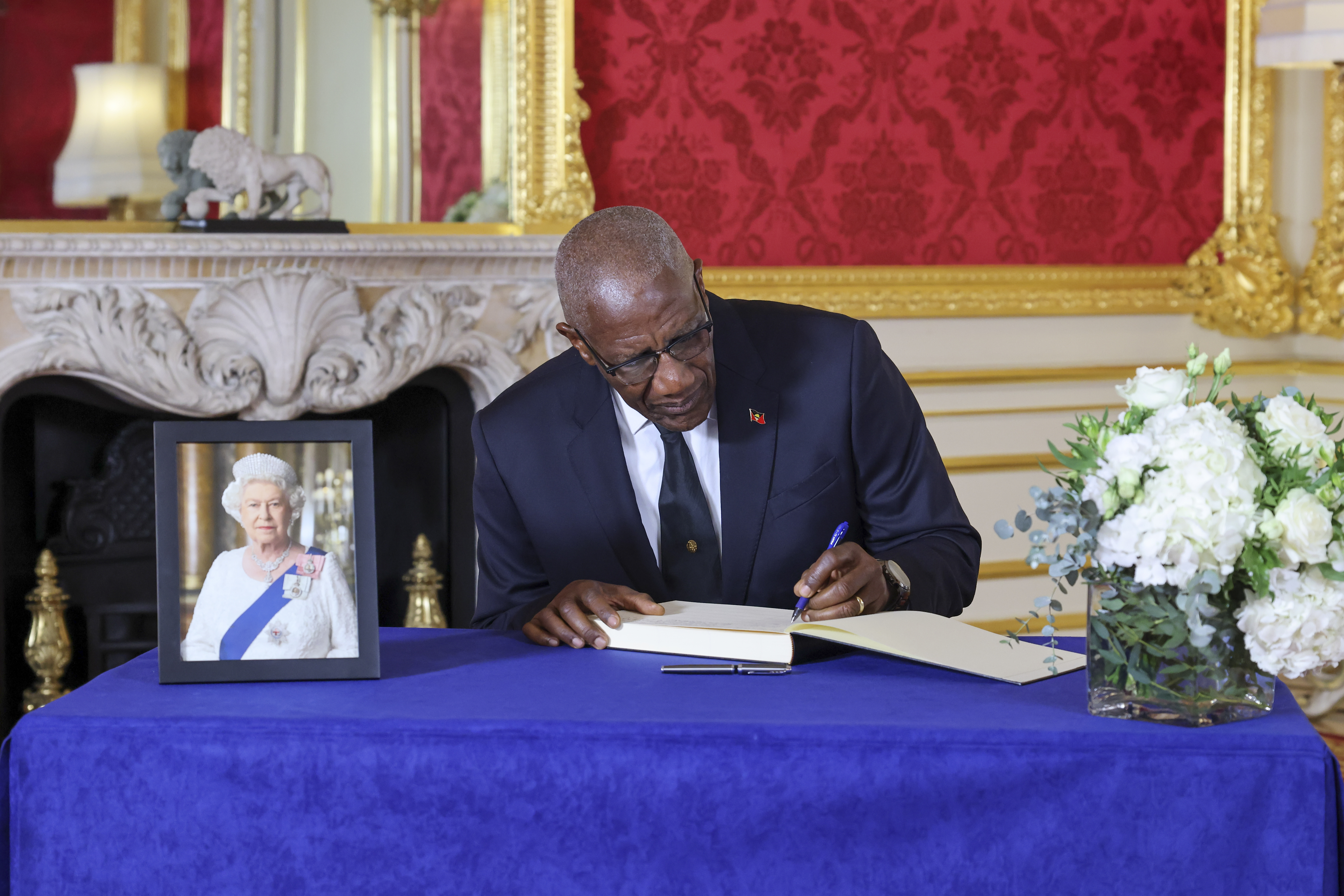
Williams signing the book of condolence for Queen Elizabeth II at Lancaster House on 17 September 2022

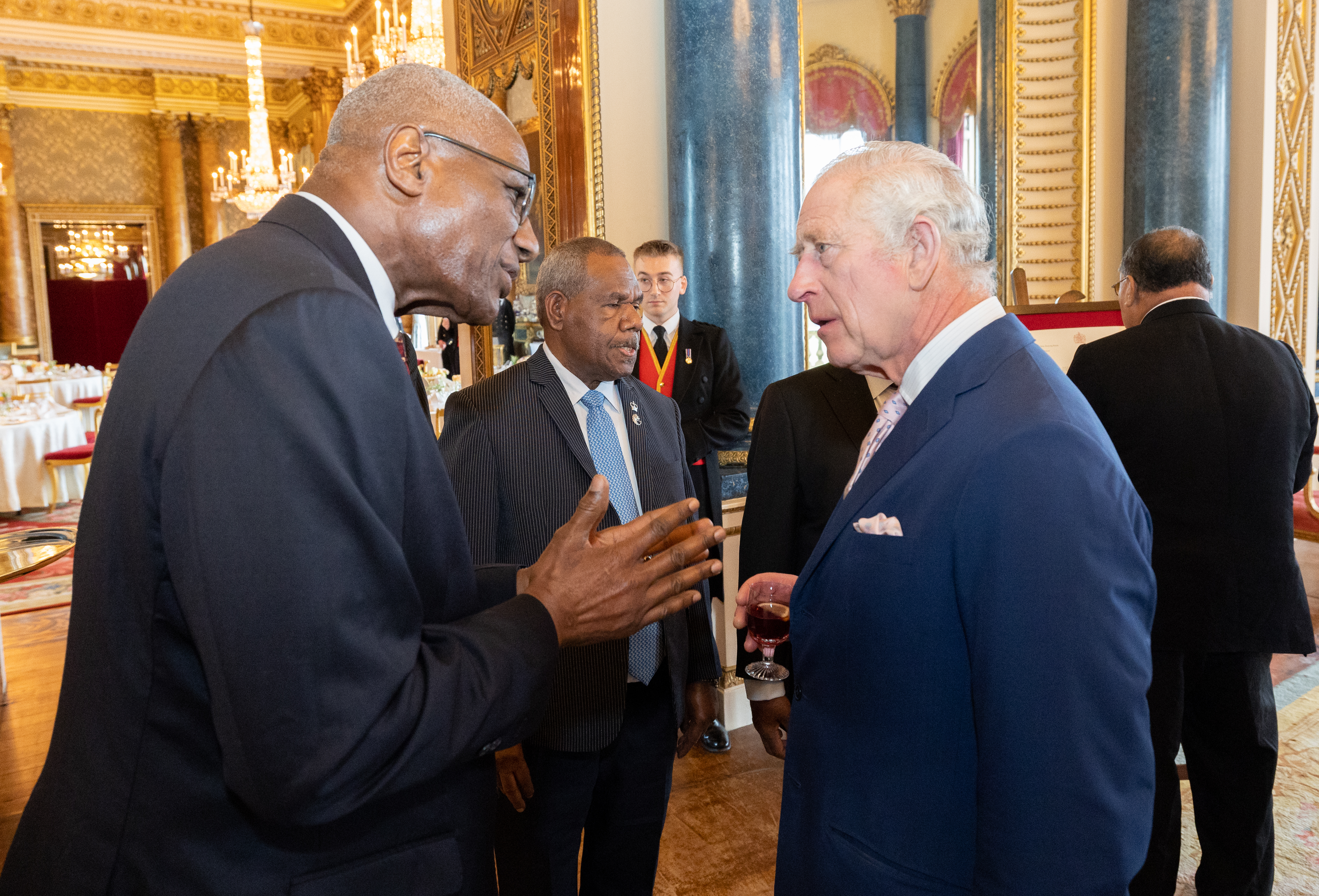
Williams with King Charles III at Buckingham Palace in 2023

Rodney was sworn into office on 14 August 2014 as the 4th Governor General of Antigua and Barbuda.

== Honours and awards ==
On 30 August 2014, Williams was appointed a Knight Grand Cross of the Order of St Michael and St George (GCMG) by Queen Elizabeth II in the 2014 Special Honours.

In November 2014, he received the Gold Benemerenti Medal of the Sacred Military Constantinian Order of St. George and was invested as a Knight Grand Cross of the Royal Order of Francis I by Prince Carlo, Duke of Castro. On 22 December 2014, Williams was made a Knight of the Order of Saint John (KStJ), also in the 2014 Special Honours.

In May 2019, Williams was awarded an honorary PhD degree from St. Mary's College of Maryland.

In January 2021, he received an honorary DSc degree from the University of the West Indies.

In November 2024, during his visit to India, he was presented with two distinguished honors. At the 25th International Conference of Chief Justices, Heads of States, and Heads of Governments, which took place in Lucknow from November 20 to 24, 2024, he received the Mahatma Gandhi Award for his unwavering dedication to global unity and peace. Additionally, he received recognition for his noteworthy contributions to humanitarian work and education.

Government offices
Preceded by Louise Lake-Tack	Governor-General of Antigua and Barbuda; 2014–present	Incumbent
