= History of Antigua and Barbuda =

The history of Antigua and Barbuda covers the period from the arrival of the Archaic peoples thousands of years ago to the present day. Prior to European colonization, the lands encompassing present-day Antigua and Barbuda were inhabited by three successive Amerindian societies. The island was claimed by England, who colonized the islands in 1632. Under English/British control, the islands witnessed an influx of both Britons and Africans (via enslavement) to the island. In 1981, the islands were granted independence as the modern state of Antigua and Barbuda.

== Early history (2900 BC–17th century) ==
Antigua was first settled by pre-agricultural Amerindians in what is known as the "Archaic Period." The earliest known settlement on the island is Twenty Hill, which may date as far back as 2900 BC. The Archaic people lasted until around 100 BC.

Eastern Taíno Arawak people migrated from what is now Venezuela as early as 775 BC on their way into the Lesser Antilles. Evidence of the Arawak is primarily that of their innovative pottery, which has been found across Antigua and Barbuda. The sophisitication of the pottery degraded over several centuries, which some archeologists have taken as evidence of the appearance of another Amerindian group, perhaps the Kalinago.

Much like the rest of the Caribbean, the original population of Antigua and Barbuda was mostly destroyed by European and African diseases, malnutrition and slavery. Relatives of the Antiguan Arawak and Kalinago still live in various countries in South America, notably Brazil, Venezuela and Colombia. The smaller remaining native populations in the West Indies maintain a pride in their heritage.

== British rule (1632–1981) ==
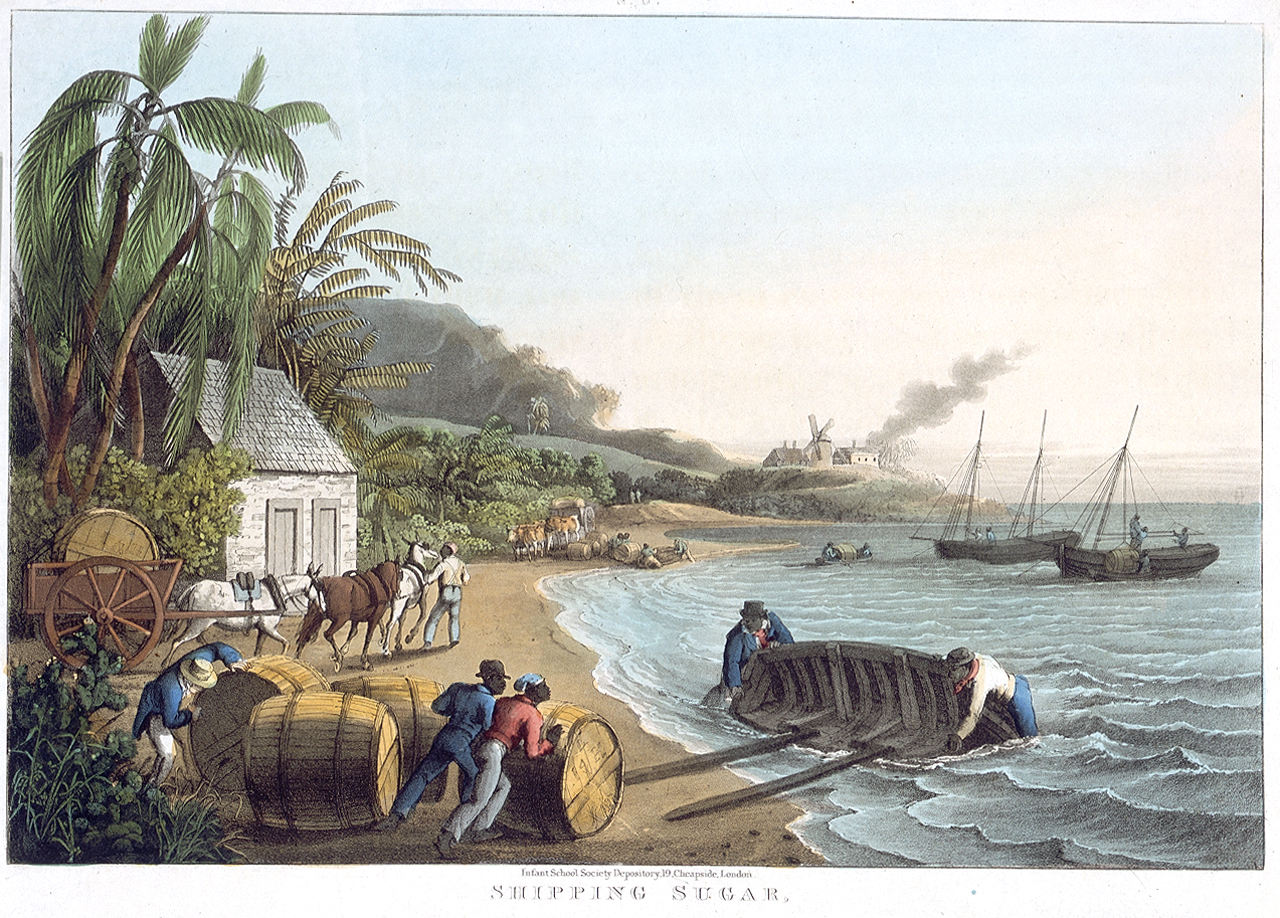
Depiction of the sugar industry on Antigua in 1823

Christopher Columbus sighted islands in 1493 during his second voyage naming the larger one Santa Maria de la Antigua. However, early attempts by Europeans to settle the islands failed due to the Caribs' excellent defenses. England succeeded in colonising the islands in 1632, with Thomas Warner as the first governor. Settlers used slave labor to raise tobacco, indigo, ginger and sugarcane as cash crops. Sir Christopher Codrington established the first large sugar estate in Antigua in 1674, and leased Barbuda to raise provisions for his plantations. Barbuda's only town is named after him. In the fifty years after Codrington established his initial plantation, the sugar industry became so profitable that many farmers replaced other crops with sugar, making it the economic backbone of the islands.

Slavery was common in Barbuda in the 1700s and until 1834. The island was a source of slaves for other locations, too. No new slaves had arrived on the island since the mid-1700s but their population grew naturally. An estimate in 1977 by Lowenthal and Clark indicated that during 1779 to 1834 the number of slaves exported totalled 172; most were taken to Antigua but 37 went to the Leeward and Windward islands and some to the southern US. Several slave rebellions took place on the island, with the most serious in 1834–5. Britain emancipated slaves in most of its colonies in 1834, but that did not include Barbuda, so the island then freed its own slaves. For some years thereafter, the freed slaves had little opportunity of survival on their own because of limited agricultural land and the lack of available credit to buy some. Hence, they continued to work on the plantations for nominal wages or lived in shantytowns and worked as occasional labourers. Sugar cane production remained the primary economy for over a century.

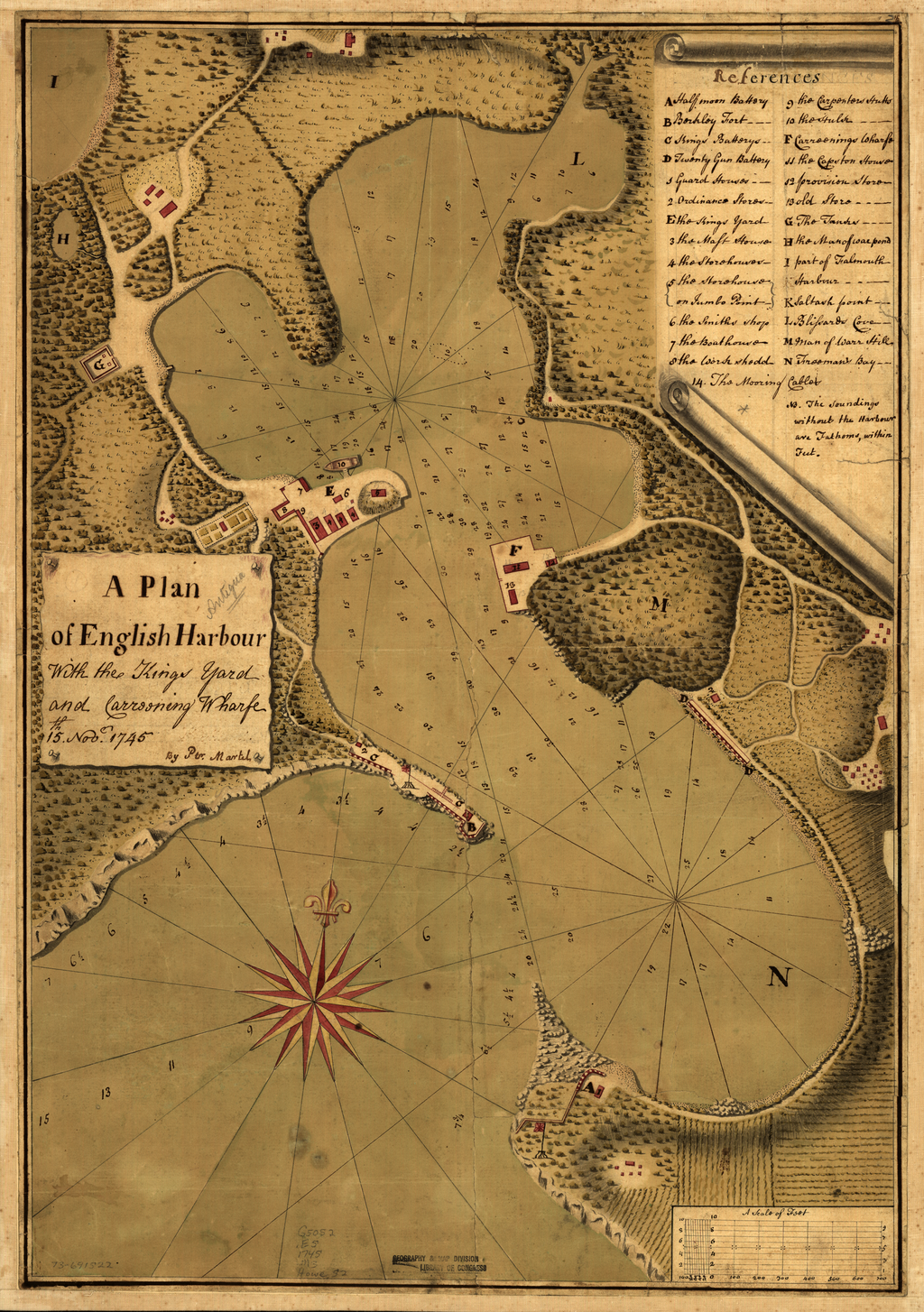
Plan for English Harbour in Antigua from 1745

During the 18th century, Antigua was used as the headquarters of the British Royal Navy Caribbean fleet. English Harbour Dockyard, as it came to be called, a sheltered and well-protected deepwater port, was the main base and facilities there were greatly expanded during the later 18th century. Admiral Horatio Nelson commanded the British fleet for much of this time, and made himself unpopular with local merchants by enforcing the Navigation Act, a British ruling that only British-registered ships could trade with British colonies. As the United States were no longer British colonies, the act posed a problem for merchants, who depended on trade with the fledgling country.

As the main cash crop changed over the years, the main cash crops/products grown between 1953 and 1956 were cotton, sugar, meat, cereals, and local fruits and vegetables. Over time, the importance of crops and produce went into decline as other nations were able to sell goods at a price no longer feasible to sustain in the Antiguan economy. In more recent times, however, Antigua has developed a primarily service-based economy relying on tourism as their leading source of income. Much like other islands and nations that rely on tourism, this can become problematic as their success depends on the willingness of others to travel and explore the area. Moreover, this has tendency to follow a seasonal pattern leaving the country vulnerable at certain times in the year.

=== Political development ===
The colonial ensign of Antigua and Barbuda from 1956 to 1962

Along with most colonies of the British Empire, all slaves in Antigua were emancipated in 1833, but remained economically dependent upon the island's white plantation owners. Economic opportunities for the freed population were limited by a lack of surplus farming land, no access to credit and an economy built on agriculture rather than manufacturing. Poor labour conditions persisted until 1939 when a member of a British Crown commission urged the formation of a trade union movement.

The Antigua Trades and Labour Union, formed shortly afterward, became the political vehicle for Sir Vere Cornwall Bird, who became the union's president in 1943. The Antigua Labour Party (ALP), formed by Bird and other trade unionists, first ran candidates in the 1946 elections and became the majority party in 1951, beginning a long history of electoral victories. Voted out of office in the 1971 general elections that swept the progressive labour movement into power, Bird and the ALP returned to office in 1976.

Until 1958, Antigua and Barbuda were part of the British Leeward Islands. From 1958 to 1962, Antigua and Barbuda were part of the West Indies Federation.

=== Social class and ethnic composition ===
The development of social class of Antigua and Barbuda primarily occurred during the colonial era, where the immigration of British colonists (and subsequent importation of African slaves) created a strict hierarchy based both on race and class; Antigua and Barbuda has been described as "a classic case of the superimposition of race on class and vice versa." Both before and after the abolition of slavery in 1833, the two islands were dominated by a small minority of white plantation owners who constituted the colonial upper class. Beneath them were the Afro-Caribbean population, who "constituted the subordinate working class." In between these two groups were several middlemen minorities: free people of color, along with Portuguese and Syrian immigrants, who dominated the professions of law, medicine, and architecture "and the white-collar positions in banks, businesses, and the civil service."

Between 1847 and 1852, 2,500 Portuguese immigrants from the island of Madeira emigrated to Antigua due to a severe famine. There, they established numerous small businesses and quickly joined the ranks of the colonial middle class, which up until then had been dominated by the island's mulatto population. As noted by historian Jo-Anne Ferreira, following "the abolition of slavery, post-abolition migration became a matter of economic survival for many plantation owners, because of the impending labor problems. There was an increasing interest in and desire for European labor, so the Portuguese, among others, were imported throughout the West Indies to increase the European population vis-à-vis the African population." In contrast to the Portuguese, Syrian immigrants to Antigua and Barbuda did not start arriving until the 1950s, and "are primarily involved in the import business and have managed to establish themselves in academic professions." As of 2008, there were approximately 475 to 500 permanent residents of Antigua and Barbuda who are of Syrian descent.

The Irish first came to Antigua either as indentured servants or merchants; Irish indentured servants were primarily transported to Antigua during the Cromwellian conquest of Ireland. As increasing numbers of African slaves were transported to Antigua, the island's Irish population began to leave in search of opportunities in the rest of the British West Indies or in Britain's North American colonies. Numerous Irish merchants in Antigua belonged to business families from County Galway, and several Irish-Antiguans formed relationships with Irish servants in Montserrat.

The Afro-Caribbean inhabitants of Antigua and Barbuda, who "account for about 91% of the country’s population", are primarily descended from African slaves who were transported from West and Central Africa during the slave trade, in regions such as the Bight of Biafra, the Gold Coast, Sierra Leone, the Gulf of Guinea, the Bight of Benin, and Senegambia. 4.4% of the Black Antiguan and Barbudan population are mixed-raced.

== Independent Antigua and Barbuda (1981–present) ==
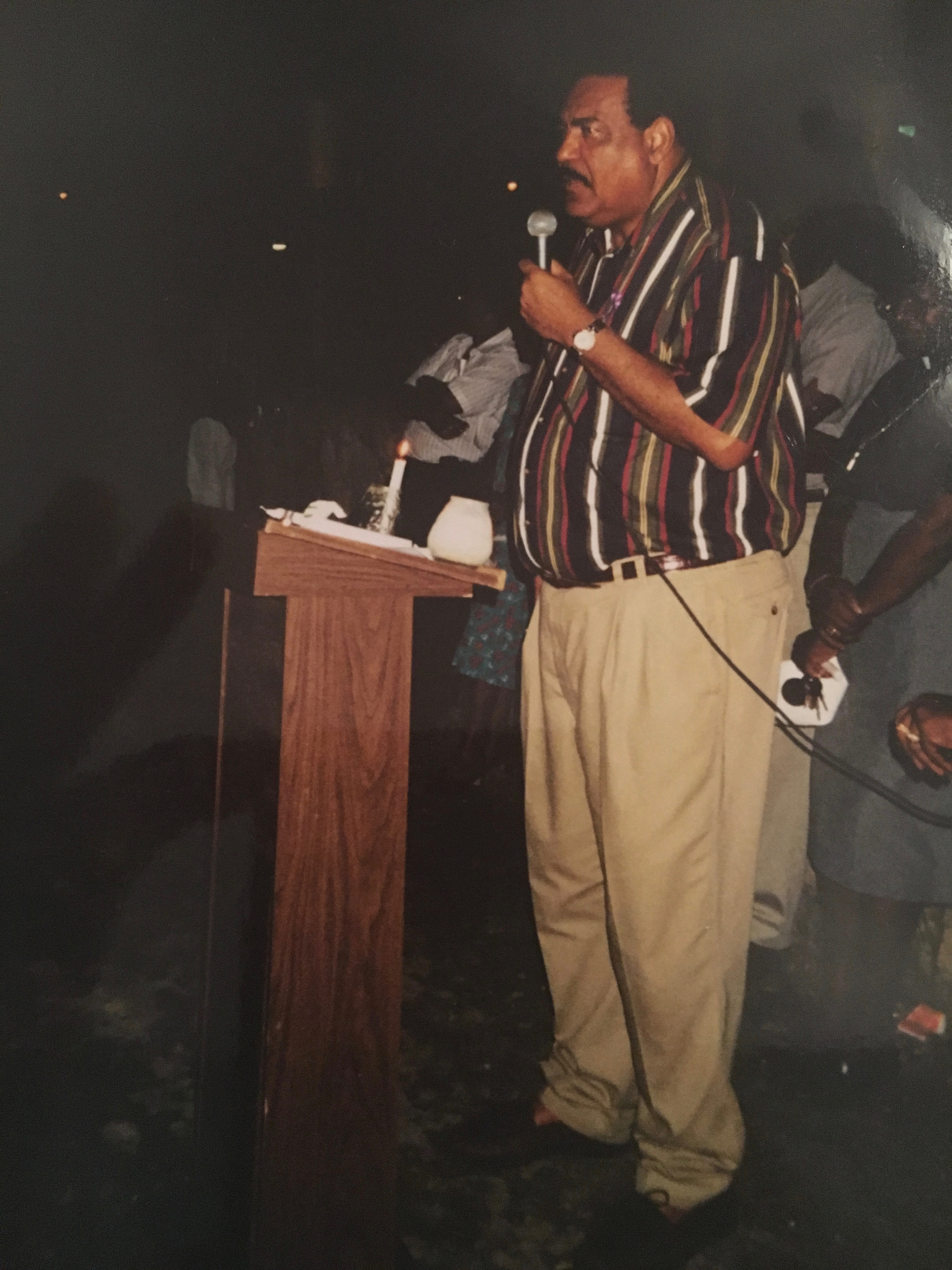
Lester Bird in 2016. He served as the second prime minister of Antigua and Barbuda from 1994 to 2004.

The islands gained independence from the United Kingdom in 1981, becoming the nation of Antigua and Barbuda. The country became part of the Commonwealth of Nations, and a constitutional monarchy, with the first Queen of Antigua and Barbuda being Elizabeth II. The monarch is represented in the country by the governor-general of Antigua and Barbuda.

In 1997, Prime Minister Lester Bird announced that a group of ecologically sensitive islands just off Antigua's northeastern coast, previously proposed for national park status, were being turned over to Malaysian developers. The Guiana Island Development Project deal, calling for a 1,000-room hotel, an 18-hole golf course and a world-class casino, sparked widespread criticism by environmentalists, minority members in parliament and the press. The issue came to a head when a local resident shot the PM's brother. Today, the proposed development is mired in lawsuits and politics.

The Antigua and Barbuda Labour Party (ABLP) won renewed mandates in the general elections in 1984 and 1989. In the 1989 elections, the ruling ABLP won all but two of the 17 seats. During elections in March 1994, power passed from Vere Bird to his son, Lester Bird, but remained within the ABLP which won 11 of the 17 parliamentary seats. The United Progressive Party won the 2004 elections and Baldwin Spencer became Prime Minister, removing from power the longest-serving elected government in the Caribbean. Baldwin was the Prime Minister of Antigua and Barbuda from 2004 to 2014.

In 2014 the Antigua and Barbuda Labour Party regained power from a massive win with the leader being the "World Boss", Gaston A. Browne. A snap election was called three years later, and the Antigua and Barbuda Labour Party led by the incumbent Prime Minister Hon. Gaston Browne dominated the elections with a landslide victory of 15-1-1. General elections were held in Antigua and Barbuda on 18 January 2023 to elect members of the House of Representatives. The Labour Party (ABLP) has held an absolute majority of 15 seats in the House of Representatives after the 2018 general election, with Gaston Browne remaining as prime minister. Browne initiated a constitutional referendum after the 2018 election, which was rejected by voters, and following the death of Elizabeth II in 2022, he announced his intention to hold a referendum for the country's transition to a republican system. Besides ABLP, the United Progressive Party (UPP), Democratic National Alliance, Barbuda People's Movement (BPM), and three independent politicians filed candidacies for the 2023 general election.

During the election campaign, UPP proposed to raise the minimum wage and expressed support for small businesses, while ABLP pledged to construct more homes and open two polyclinics. ABLP retained its majority in the House of Representatives, although it won a reduced 9 seats, while UPP won 6 seats. Trevor Walker, the leader of the BPM, retained his seat in Barbuda, while Asot Michael, an independent politician and former member of ABLP, won his seat in the St. Peter constituency. Browne was sworn in for his third consecutive term as prime minister a day after the election.

== See also ==
- Antigua and Barbuda
- Antigua Carnival
- British colonization of the Americas
- French colonization of the Americas
- History of the Americas
- History of Barbuda
- History of the British West Indies
- History of North America
- History of the Caribbean
- Politics of Antigua and Barbuda
- List of prime ministers of Antigua and Barbuda
- Spanish colonization of the Americas
