= St. Philip's South =

Parliamentary constituency in Antigua and Barbuda

- Constituency for the Parliament of Antigua and Barbuda
- Polling divisions: 3
- Electorate: 1,263 (2026)

Current constituency
- Party: ABLP
- Member: Kiz Nathaniel Johnson

St. Philip's South is a parliamentary constituency in Saint Philip and Saint Paul, Antigua and Barbuda. It is composed of the villages of Mill Reef, Half Moon Bay, Montpelier, Freetown, St. Phillip's, Christian Hill, Bethesda, Lyons, and portions of Piccadilly.

The constituency has three polling divisions, all of which were dominated by the UPP in the 2023 general election.

== Electoral history ==
Party	1971	1976	1980	1984	1989	1994	1999	2004	2009	2014	2018	2023	2026
ALP	44.51%	50.10%	60.90%	65.65%	63.04%	43.90%	50.34%	41.55%	31.96%	45.63%	49.79%	37.34%	52.61%
UPP	-	-	-	34.35%	36.96%	56.10%	49.66%	58.45%	68.04%	54.37%	47.71%	60.37%	47.39%
PLM	54.53%	49.90%	39.10%	-	-	-	-	-	-	-	-	-	-
Others	0.96%	0.00%	0.00%	0.00%	0.00%	0.00%	0.00%	0.00%	0.00%	0.00%	0.62%	2.90%	0.00%
Valid	728	1,000	995	882	974	1,057	1,184	953	973	962	944	970	937
Invalid	20	0	4	7	4	3	10	2	6	6	18	41	6
Total	748	1,000	999	889	978	1,060	1,194	955	979	968	962	1,011	943
Registered	1,094	1,035	1,175	1,265	1,400	1,571	1,669	1,013	1,160	1,056		1,258	1,263
Turnout	68.37%	96.62%	85.02%	70.28%	69.86%	67.47%	71.54%	94.27%	84.40%	91.67%		80.37%	74.66%

== Members of parliament ==
The current member of parliament is Sherfield Bowen.

Year	Winner	Party	% Votes
1971	Cyril James	PLM	54.53%
1976	Reuben Henry Harris	ALP	50.10%
1980	Reuben Henry Harris	ALP	60.90%
1984	Reuben Henry Harris	ALP	65.65%
1989	Reuben Henry Harris	ALP	63.04%
1994	Willmoth Daniel	UPP	56.10%
1999	Sherfield Bowen	ALP	50.34%
2004	Willmoth Daniel	UPP	58.45%
2009	Willmoth Daniel	UPP	68.04%
2014	Willmoth Daniel	UPP	54.37%
2018	Lennox Weston	ABLP	50.74%
2023	Sherfield Bowen	UPP	60.37%
2026	Kiz Nathaniel Johnson	UPP	52.61%
