= St. Philip's, Antigua and Barbuda =

Capital of Saint Philip, Antigua and Barbuda

St. Philip's Sen Filip Ffryes
- Village
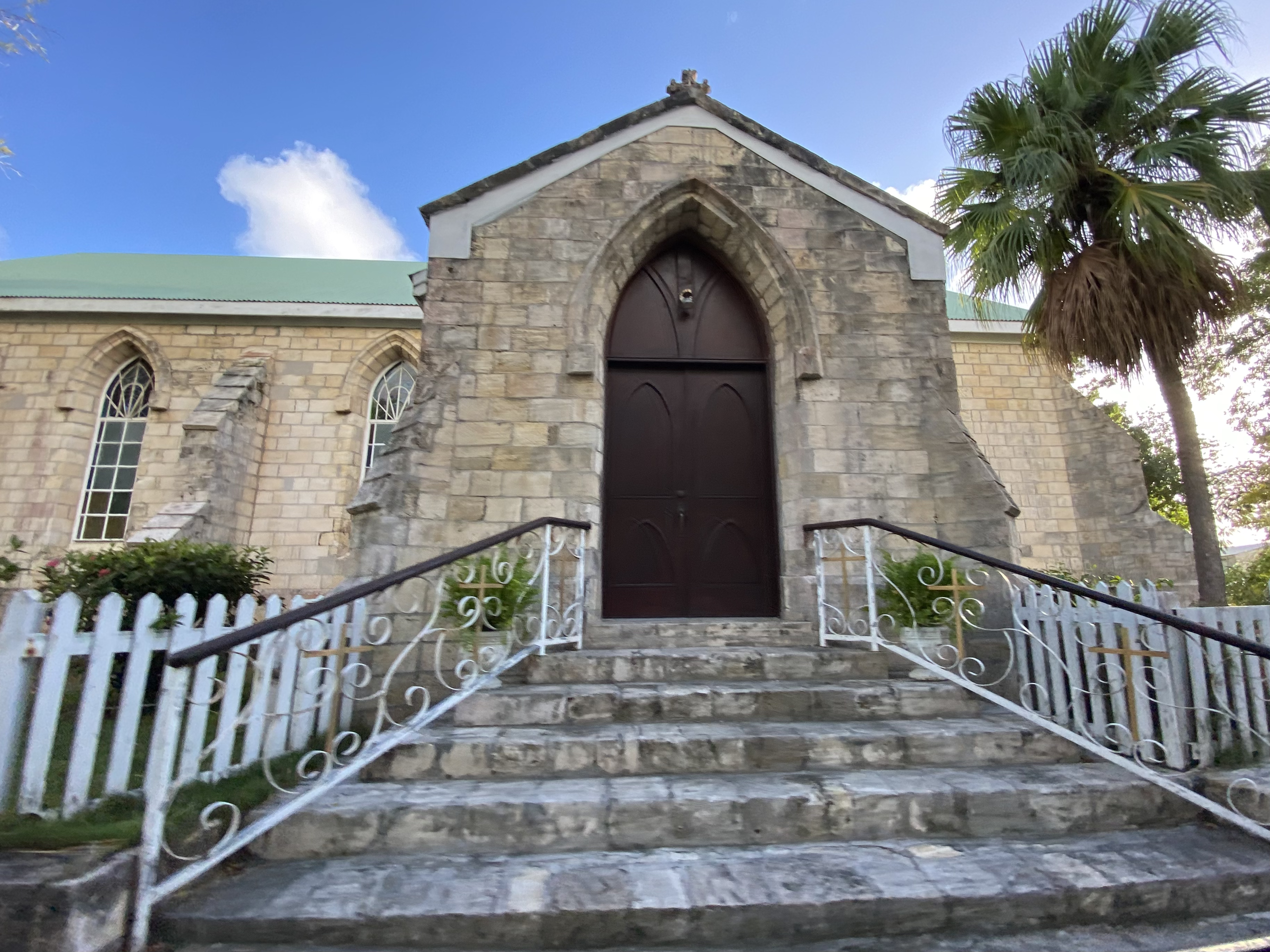
- St. Philip's Anglican Church
- Interactive map of the St. Philip's main place
- Location within Antigua and Barbuda
- Coordinates: 17°02′41″N 61°43′33″W
- Country: Antigua and Barbuda
- Island: Antigua
- Parish: Saint Philip
- First mentioned: 1665

Area
  - Total: 0.57 km^{2} (0.22 sq mi)

Population (2011)
  - Total: 131
  - Density: 230/km^{2} (600/sq mi)
- Time zone: UTC-4 (AST)

St. Philip's (North Antiguan: Sen Filip) (Note: North Antiguan pronunciation: [sɛn fɪlɪp]; also known as Ffryes (/fɹaɪz/). Sometimes called St. Philip's Village to distinguish it from the parish.) is a village in the parish of Saint Philip, Antigua and Barbuda. St. Philip's is the capital of Saint Philip, and one of the smallest settlements in Antigua and Barbuda. St. Philip's had a population of 131 in 2011, and an area of 0.57 square kilometres. St. Philip's is south of Newfield and the Ffryes sugar estate and west of Freetown. It is home to the parish church and a post office. The village has an elevation of 107 metres and overlooks Willoughby Bay.

An estate known as Ffryes was first mentioned in 1665. At the time, the estate was owned by John Frye and was sized at 132 acres. When slavery was abolished, the estate was given about £1,500 to compensate for eighty-six slaves on the plantation. In 1830, the St. Philip's Anglican Church was established in the village, making the village the administrative centre of the parish. According to an 1856 report, the estate of Ffryes had a population of thirty-seven men and forty women. Since then, the village has had a very small population and has been mostly based around the church. The name St. Philip's likely originated from the church as well.

== Geography ==
According to the National Bureau of Statistics, the village has an area of 0.57 square kilometres. While the village is landlocked, it is located just a kilometre from Willoughby Bay. The northern portions of the village are agricultural woodlands used for rough grazing, and the southern portions are full forests. The village is located on a cliff that rapidly descends down to the bay. Deforestation exists, primarily caused by settlement and agriculture. A 2019 study noted the existence of two very small ponds within village boundaries.

St. Philip's is located in the limestone region of Antigua. Most of the village is considered at low risk for landslides and inland erosion. It is considered to be at high risk for drought. The village is about 100 metres above sea level. It is marked by farms and abandoned windmills. The village overlooks the Crossroads Centre and the bay can be clearly seen from Panoramic View Drive.

The village is located on the southern peninsula of Saint Philip parish. St. Philip's is located 1.4 kilometres south of Newfield, 2 kilometres west of Freetown, 2.8 kilometres east of Bethesda, and 5.6 kilometres northeast of English Harbour. The village is bounded by Newfield to the north, Montpelier to the north and east, and Collins to the west and south.

The main road in the village is St. Philip's Main Road, which connects the village to Newfield and Freetown. There is no public transportation and the nearest international airport is V. C. Bird International Airport, 12 kilometres to the northwest.

== History ==
Prior to colonisation, the area that is now St. Philip's was first inhabited by the Arawak and later by the post-Saladoid cultures. While there are no known Amerindian sites in the village itself, the village was located in close proximity to the major Indian Creek and Mill Reef sites. These cultures built villages and engaged in trade with other islands.

Europeans and slaves were brought to the area shortly after initial colonisation in the early seventeenth century. At this time, Bridgetown, the headtown of eastern Antigua, was located near the present-day village. Ffryes estate was established first, in 1665. There were several estates in the area, other notable ones including Wickham's (established 1681) and Harman's (established c. 1696). In 1665, Ffryes was mentioned as being an 132 acre estate owned by John Ffrye. Benjamin Wickham bought 20 acres in 1681 and an additional 60 in 1701. This purchase was controversial. Wickham, then a colonial assemblyman, blocked the sale of this land to Catherine Nugent. Before it was sold to Wickham, it was previously owned by John Duer. William Harman was mentioned as owning lands in the area prior to 1696. Ffryes changed hands several times, notably in 1763 (purchased by Samuel Redhead) and around 1774 (owned by Francis Ffrye). In 1788 the estate was "seized in fee" from George Redhead. In 1829 Ffryes had 130 slaves on 320 acres, Wickham's had 131 slaves on 216 acres, and Harman's had 139 slaves on 148 acres. In 1832 it was noted that Harman's had a private burial ground and three vaults. In 1829 an estate known as "The Hope" was founded near the present-day village centre. Following emancipation, most slaves on Antigua were too poor to switch to other industries, and continued working on these estates. The manager of Ffryes estate, a 'Mr. Hatley', was considered supportive of emancipation.

The area was severely affected by an 1843 earthquake. Nearby Bridgetown was abandoned and Harman's estate had to be rebuilt. Many of these estates continued to function following emancipation. Ffryes was mentioned in 1851 as being owned by Joseph Liggins. An account from 1861 notes that absentee ownership caused the estate to deteriorate. Ffryes was eventually auctioned off in London on 26 July 1876. The 1856 census counted 77 people living at Ffryes estate and 99 living at Harman's. In 1852, Wickham's covered 216 acres and was owned by Burnthorn Musgrave. Musgrave was born in Antigua and started his career as a sugar planter. In 1852, Harman's covered 148 acres. An 1853 map showed the parish church as having moved to the present day village. The settlement around the church was referred to as "The Rectory". The Rectory had a population of 16 in 1856. In the late 1900s the Harman family visited the estate and donated funds to restore their family cemetery. A news report from 30 March 1872 stated that one major road was in use in the village– Road 19 from Blakes to Colebrooks. Another, Road 48 from Ffryes to Lyons Bay, was considered to be abandoned. An 1891 map showed the parish church but the village itself was not labeled. In 1921 Ffryes estate covered 391 acres. An 1933 map showed a crossroads in the village and several estates along with the parish church. In 1943 Ffryes was sold to Antigua Syndicate Estates.

In the 1940s, an 'Edwards', more popularly known as 'Cotton King', made Wickham's into the largest cotton producer on the island. Following Edwards death the estate was sold to policeman Lionel L. Brown. In 1944 Harman's was bought by the Antigua Distillery and worked with the sugar plantation in Montpelier. Harman's was purchased to be used for the production of molasses, a key ingredient in the company's cavalier rum. In 1946 it was noted that a Canadian, Charlie Lang, was the chief engineer at Harman's. After his departure in 1947 Francis Nunes and his family moved into the estate house before moving to Montpelier's estate house in 1949. Nunes said that the estate was "great countryside for raising the children". The first democratic elections were held in Antigua in 1951. The St. Philip and St. Peter constituency only had one candidate, from the Antigua Labour Party. In 1954 it was noted that the Seaton's post office was assigned to St. Philip's. Today the village has a post office of its own that serves much of the surrounding communities. A 1959 map showed the village as a minor settlement, and the road that passed through the village was considered a main road. The village was not labeled on this map however.

The village was eventually apportioned into the St. Philip's South constituency in 1971. The area narrowly supported the Progressive Labour Movement in its first election. The village had a population of 139 in 1991, 156 in 2001, and 131 in 2011. In 2008 the Venezuelan government built a water storage tank in the village.

== Politics ==
St. Philip's coincides with polling division "B" of the St. Philip's South constituency. As of August 2024, there were 117 registered voters in the village. The village tends to behave with the rest of the constituency. In the 2018 general election, the village voted for the Antigua and Barbuda Labour Party (ABLP), and in the 2023 general election, the village voted for the United Progressive Party (UPP). In 2023 the UPP won 51.69% of the village's vote, the ABLP 39.33% of the vote, the Democratic National Alliance 7.87% of the vote, with 1.12% of ballots being rejected. St. Philip's has never had a village council or other form of local government.

== Demographics ==
St. Philip's had a population of 131 in 2011. The population was counted in one enumeration district, 61400. African descendants (93.69%) made up the largest ethnic group in the village. Other ethnic groups included mixed black/white (2.70%), other mixed (1.80%), white (0.90%), and unknown (0.90%). Most of the population (79.28%) were born in Antigua and Barbuda. Other countries of birth include Dominica (5.41%), Guyana (5.41%), and the United States (4.50%). The only religious institution in the village is an Anglican church, and this reflects in the village's religious composition. 45.95% of the population considered themselves Anglicans. Other major religious groups included Wesleyan Holiness (11.71%), Church of God (9.91%), Adventists (7.21%), and Methodists (6.31%). St. Philip's is considered lower medium income as of 2008, with incomes similar to Gambles, Upper Gambles, and Clarkes Hill. Most people in the village speak North Antiguan Creole.

In 2011, the village had fifty-one households. Most households used concrete (56.86%) or wood (23.53%) for their outer walls. Popular roofing materials included sheet metal (64.71%) and wood shingles (31.37%). 15.91% of non-immigrants in the village had lived abroad at some point in their life.

== Features ==
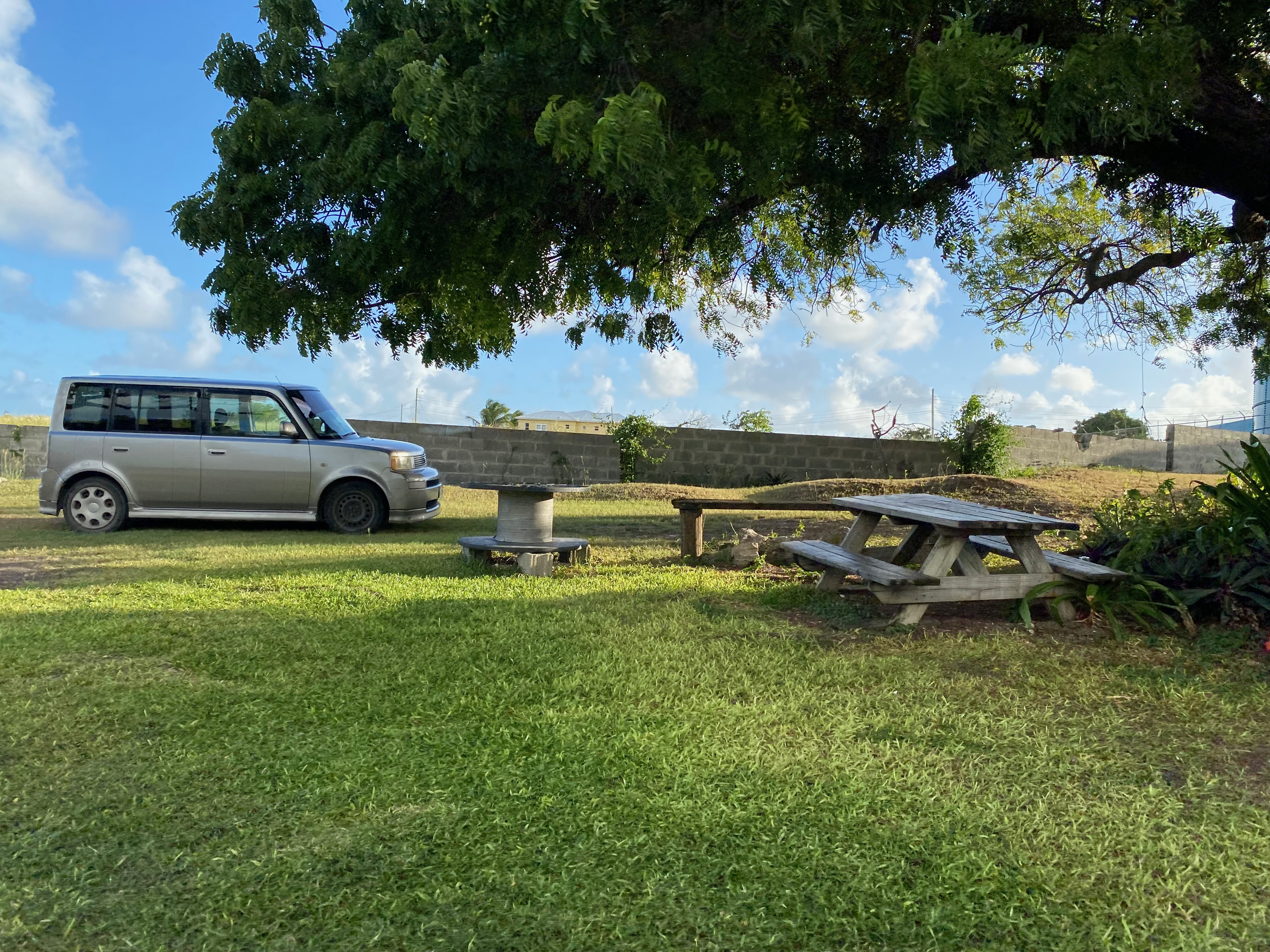
Outdoor seating for a restaurant in the village

St. Philip's is roughly equidistant between Newfield and Freetown. All roads into Freetown and to Half Moon Bay pass through the village. The main road is St. Philip's Main Road, that stretches from the southern part of Newfield to the edge of Freetown. The village is very small and thus has few amenities. The main attraction in the village is the parish church. St. Philip's Anglican Church attracts people from the Mill Reef Club and the current church was built around 1825. The church was a spiritual centre for the surrounding plantations. The church also has a cemetery. There is one restaurant in the village, Zion Spot. The post office is also located on the main road. There are several guesthouses in the village such as Stargazer Pod, Casa Coastale Antigua, and Willowby Heights Apartments. Just outside of the village are the Willoughby Bay Overview, the Crossroads Centre, and the Montpelier sugar mill tower.

There are no schools in the village. Nearby primary schools include the Newfield Primary School and Freetown Primary School. The nearest secondary school is Glanvilles Secondary School. A clinic is located in Freetown a few kilometres away.
