= Willoughby Bay Division =

Division of Antigua

Willoughby Bay
- Division
- Coordinates: 17°03′N 61°45′W
- Country: Antigua and Barbuda
- Parish: Saint Paul; Saint Philip

Willoughby Bay is a division of Saint Paul and Saint Philip, Antigua and Barbuda. It is the only division that is located in two parishes. Major settlements and locations include Bethesda, Lavington's, Ffrye's Estate, and Lyon's. It is named after Willoughby Bay which it mostly surrounds.
