= Bridgetown, Antigua and Barbuda =

Bridgetown
- Ghost town
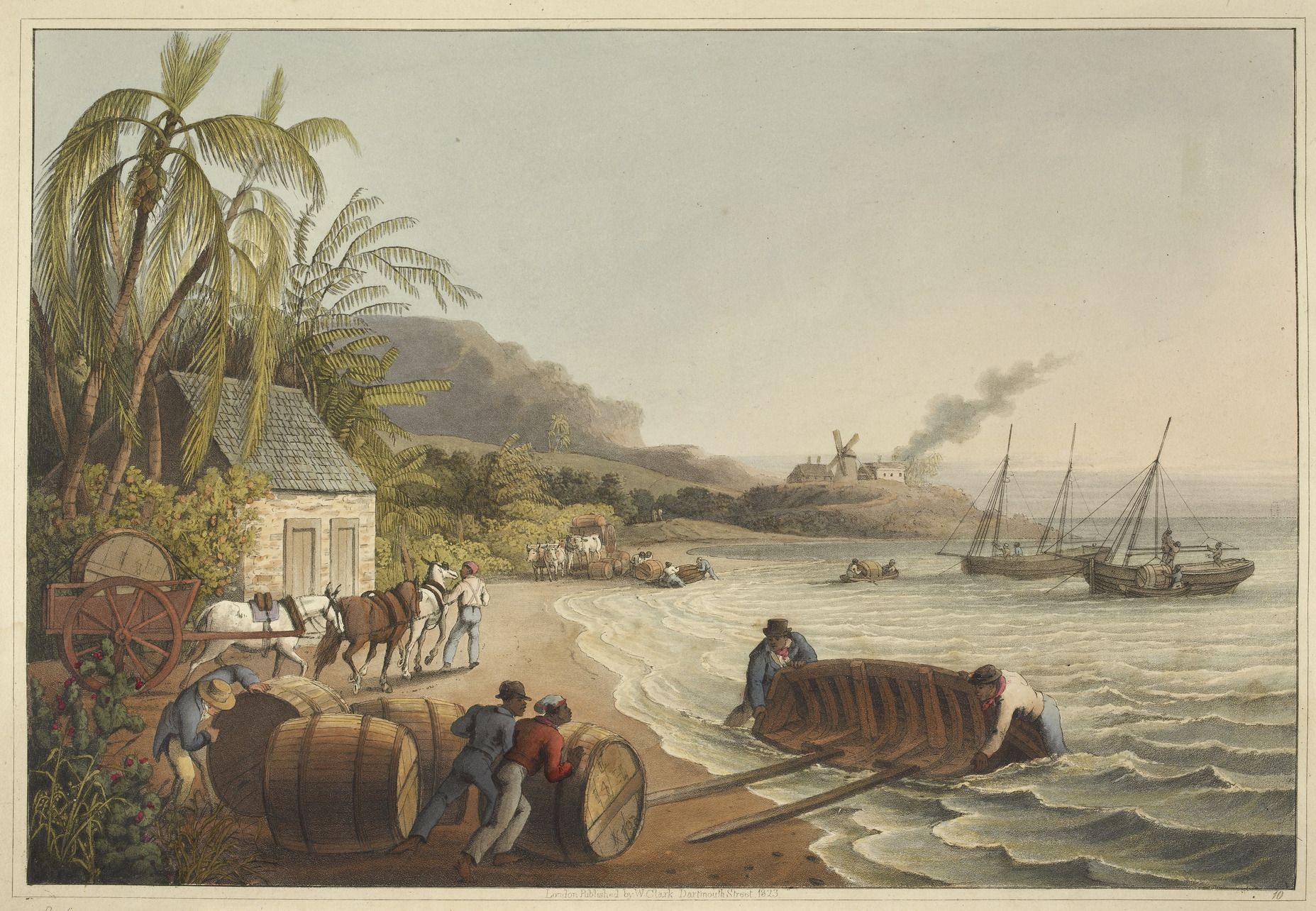
- The outskirts of the town in 1823

- Location within Antigua
- Country: Antigua and Barbuda
- Parish: Saint Philip
- Division: Willoughby Bay

Population (1856)
  - Total: 47

Bridgetown, also known as Willoughby Bay, is a ghost town in Saint Philip, Antigua and Barbuda.

== Geography ==
Bridgetown was located in the southeast of the island. It was located on the coast of Willoughby Bay, on its north shore, where the high plateau of the southeastern peninsula of Antigua meets the sea.

== History ==
Willoughby Bay is one of the natural ports of Antigua, protected by a reef bank with passage, but shallow and relatively poorly accessible, the terrain level is steep, the inner bay, the Christian Cove, is a more extensive wetland. An English trading post was created here c. 1675. This post was protected by the eastern Fort William. The Anglican Church, St. Philip's Rectory, the main church of the Parish of Saint Phillip, was located at the top of today's place of St. Philip's. Politically, the area belonged to the Willoughby Bay Division of the island.

The other ports, such as Falmouth, Parham or St. John's, quickly became much more important. Around 1750, Fort William was already in a desolate state after hurricane damage, and only occupied by two men.

In 1820, the Methodists (today Methodist Church in the Caribbean and Americas), who had been proselytizing in Antigua since the 1760s and from 1812 ran a school in Bethesda village, founded a congregation with a chapel.

Emancipation Day was observed with much fanfare on 1 August 1834. Coconut fronds were used to decorate the Wesleyan Chapel, and cakes and lemonade were served to the elderly and schoolchildren. The majority of the citizens attended church during the day, and in the evenings there were dances and celebrations. There was not a disturbance anywhere on the island. Following the holiday, laborers resumed their jobs on an equal basis and sugar cane production continued.

After the abolition of slavery in 1834, a large part of the population moved to the free city of Freetown and also to Bethesda. The Methodists therefore moved their congregation to Bethesda in 1841 and also built a chapel in Freetown.

During an earthquake in 1843, the settlement was largely destroyed, and the rest of the Black inhabitants migrated to Bethesda and Freetown. For a while, the Methodist pastor was still resident in Bridgetown until the new mission house in Freetown was completed in 1847. In 1856, the place had only 17 buildings and 47 inhabitants. In the course of the following years, the settlement was then completely abandoned.

Today, the Crossroads Centre is located here, an upscale drug rehabilitation center founded by musician Eric Clapton. The ruins of Fort William are still there.
