= Christian Cove =

Bay in Antigua and Barbuda

Coordinates: 17°2′29″N 61°44′33″W

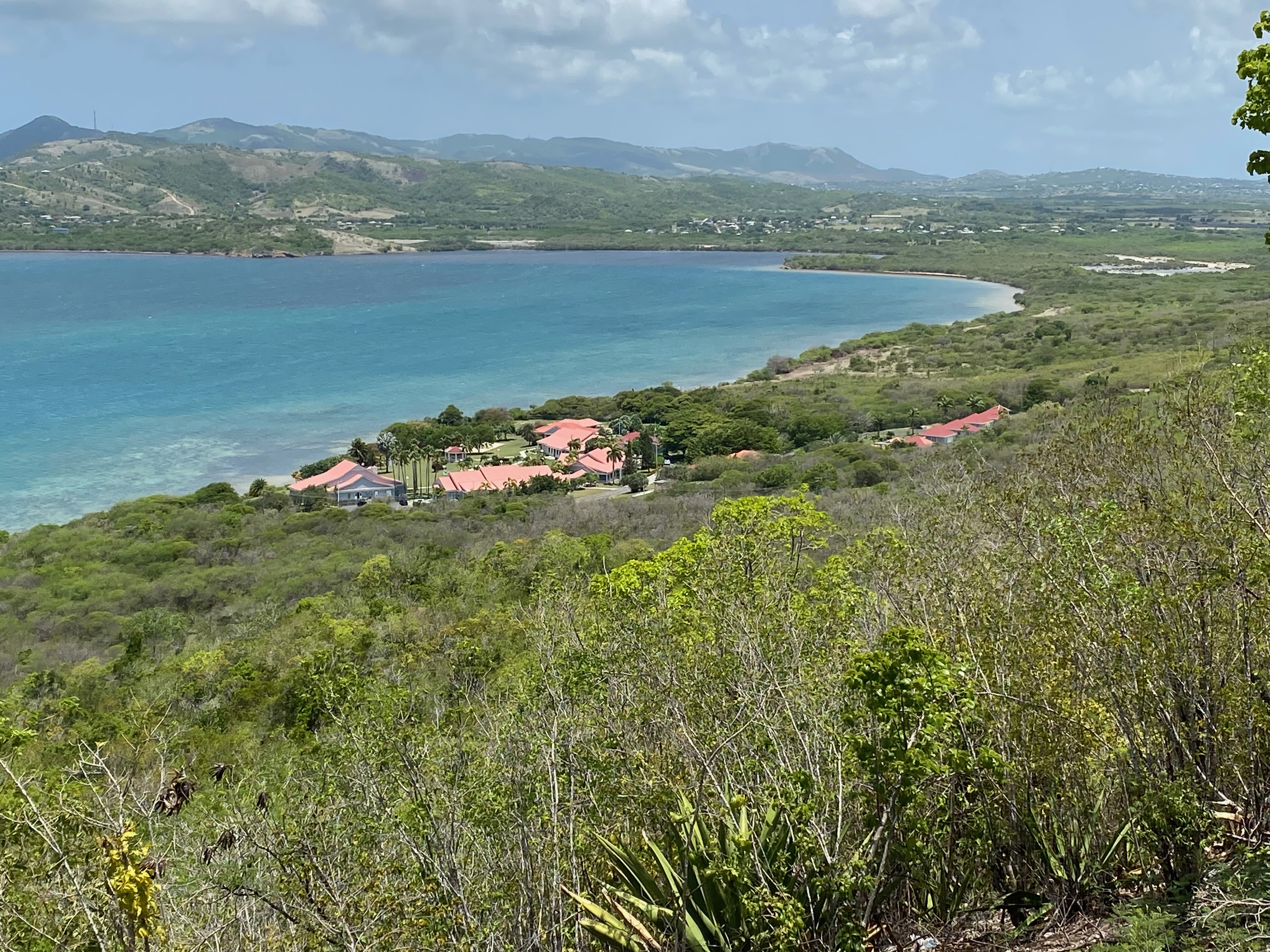
The cove in 2023

Christian Cove is a bay on the southern coast of the Caribbean island of Antigua. It is a part of Willoughby Bay, one of the island's largest bays. It is close to Bethesda and Christian Hill. The lagoon-like sea area, about 700 meters wide and 500 meters deep into the land, with a depth of 5 meters deep, is surrounded by wetlands.

The mangrove swamps of Christian Cove are among the largest remaining on the island. In the wetland there is also a natural freshwater pond, which is fed from the overflow of the Bethesda Dam.

Populations of West Indian whistling duck and Laughing gull are endemic to the cove. In 2007, BirdLife International created an Important Bird Area (AG011) with 95 ha, according to the criteria A1 (threatened species) and A4i (at least 1% of the total population). Due to planned tourist developments, there have been proposals to establish Christian Cove as a protected area.
