= Mill Reef–Half Moon Bay =

- Village
- Half Moon Bay in December 2015
- Interactive map of the Mill Reef–Half Moon Bay main place
- Coordinates: 17°3′1″N 61°41′30″W
- Country: Antigua and Barbuda
- Parish: Saint Philip

Area
  - Total: 10.34 km^{2} (3.99 sq mi)

Population (2011)
  - Total: 13

Mill Reef–Half Moon Bay is a village in Saint Philip, Antigua and Barbuda. It had a population of 13 people in 2011.

== Geography ==
According to the Antigua and Barbuda Statistics Division, the village had a total area of 10.34 square kilometres in 2011. It includes the various unnamed locations between the outer south coast of Nonsuch Bay (around Grassfield Cove and Hungry Hill/Cork Point), on Green Bay (Ricketts Bay, Devils Cove, Little Deep Bay, Neck of Land, Great Deep Bay, The Brook) via Watsons, Friars Head Bay and Friars Head to the south around Exchange Bay, Soldiers Point, Half Moon Bay, Hudson Point and Mannings. It is adjacent to Green Island and York Island.

Despite its extensive area, it has a very low population.

== History ==
Nonsuch Bay is one of the best natural ports of Antigua, although it is difficult to reach and has a low entrance. Green Bay is one of the two passages into the bay. At Green Bay is Hungry Hill, where Fort Harman, an old British position was built. It is no longer in use. During the era of sugar, there were a few small farms in the area. Around 1770 the "Ten Acre Lands", state property, which was parceled for small farms was located nearby – in addition to a fishing settlement on Half Moon Bay.

In 1947, the Mill Reef Club, an exclusive holiday and yacht club was established with 45 founding members. The club also owns Green Island, and since 1952 there has been a golf course. In the 1950s, the Half Moon Bay Hotel was built, one of the first tourist hotels in Antigua. From 1971 it was expanded by investors to become the Half Moon Bay Resort, also with a golf course, and the hotel was increased from 66 to 100 beds and provided ground for holiday homes. Over the years, numerous celebrities and wealthy foreigners have stayed there. Due to its secluded location, the area contributed little to the economic development of the island's southeast. Large areas of the southeastern tip of the peninsula are not freely accessible.

In 1995, Hurricane Luis devastated this area, destroying the Half Moon Bay Resort. Reconstruction was hindered by the Antiguan government, which awarded the land to financial fraudster Allen Stanford. The area was expropriated in June 2007. A final decision on the land's ownership and the facility's future is still pending, and the hotel complex has now largely been dilapidated. The beach is a rather rarely visited destination by locals and excursionists.

== Demographics ==
There were 13 people living in Mill Reef as of the 2011 census. 100% were black and the population was mostly people of Antiguan and Barbudan origin with one Jamaican immigrant.
