= Green Island (Antigua and Barbuda) =

Island off Antigua

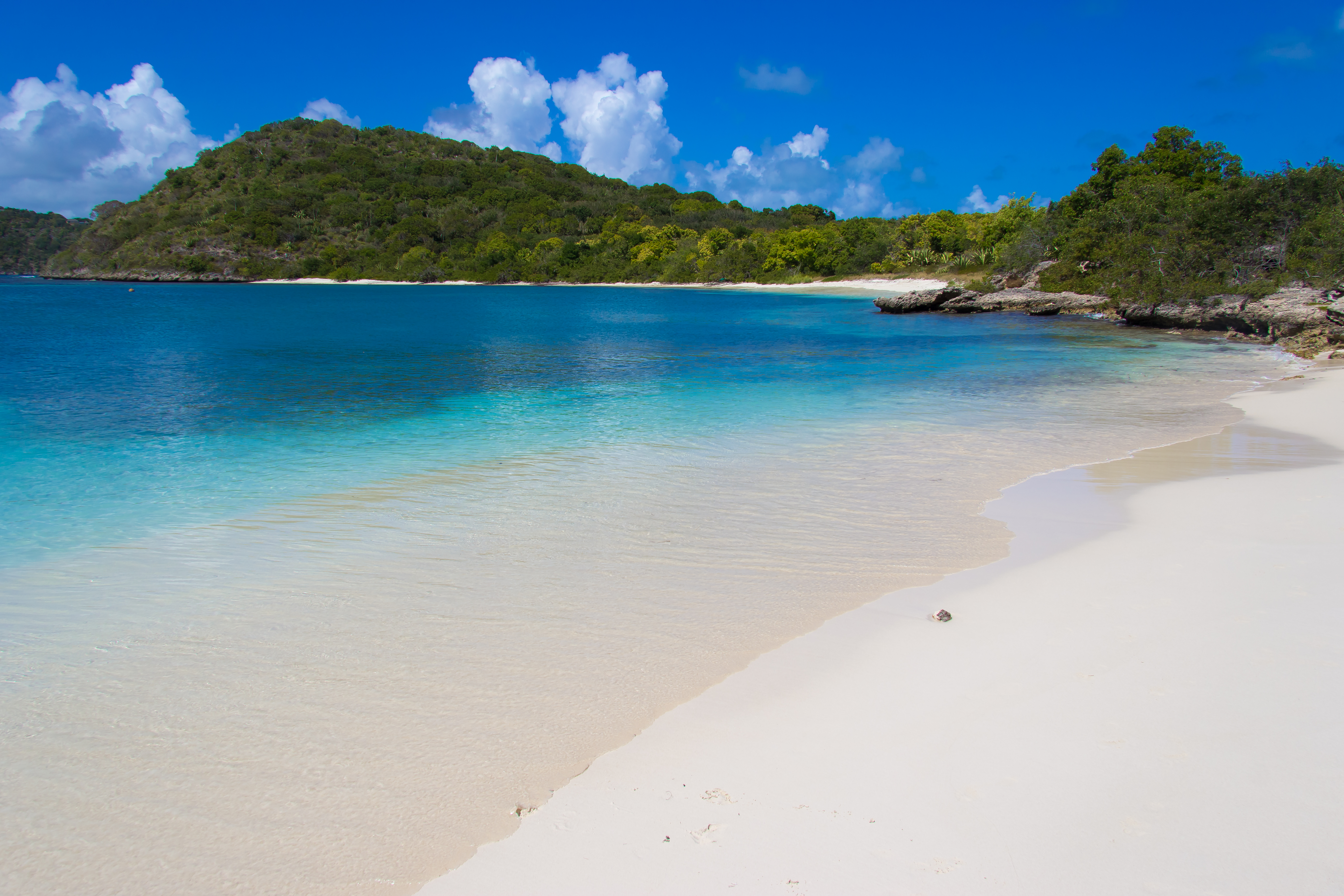
- Beach on Green Island

- Location within Antigua and Barbuda Location within Lesser Antilles Location within the Caribbean

Geography
- Location: Caribbean
- Coordinates: 17.0705°N 61.666667°W

Administration
- Antigua and Barbuda

Additional information
- Time zone: AST (UTC-4)
- Private island

Location of Green Island within Antigua and Barbuda

Green Island is a small island lying off the eastern coast of Antigua. It is a private island that has been owned by the Mill Reef Club since 1947. It lies close to the mouth of Nonsuch Bay.

== History ==
Colonel Richard Ayres was granted the lease of Green Island in 1673. By 1731 it was owned by Stephen Blizard, and was still owned by Blizard's heirs in 1790. The heirs of Robert Maginley owned the island in 1921. Maginley and his three brothers were immigrants to Antigua from Ireland and eventually owned 4,500 acres making them the largest landholders on Antigua. A plantation was established on Green Island, very little evidence remains of the sugar mill on Green Island.

== Geography ==
Green Island is located off the southeastern peninsula of Antigua, at the southern entrance to Nonsuch Bay. Towards the mainland, the Green Bay, a bay-like strait south of the island, in front of Cape Cork Point, Green Island is only about 350 meters ( 1150 ft ) away from Antigua island. and its area is 43 ha ( 106 acres ) Administratively, it belongs to the Saint Phillip Parish.

=== Environment ===
The island itself measures about two kilometers from west to east; its width varies by two south-facing peninsulas in the range of a few hundred meters (maximum 650 m), forming several sheltered bays. Altogether, the island has an area of about 40ha. A sea-side peninsula ends in the Man of War Point, as the eastern tip of Antigua (as a region, east point of the main island the Neck of Land), from which the Atlantic Ocean extends over nearly 4,000 kilometers to the approximately latitude Cape Verde. The island rises only a few meters above sea level, and is composed of tropical brushwood and partly lined by rock, partly by pure white beaches. On both sides are reefs and rocks in front, the northern reef blocks the entire Nonsuch Bay and extends to Long Bay.

=== Important Bird Area ===
The island forms part of Antigua’s Offshore Islands Important Bird Area (IBA), designated as such by BirdLife International because it supports significant populations of various bird species, including West Indian whistling-ducks, brown pelicans, laughing gulls, and least and royal terns.
