= Demographics of St. John's, Antigua and Barbuda =

Saint John's (Antigua and Barbuda)

Demographics of St. John's
- Population: ▼22,219 (10,697 males and 11,522 females, 2011)
- Density: 700 people per.sq.km (2011 est.)

Nationality
- Major ethnic: African descendants (84.86%)
- Minor ethnic: Hispanics (6.28%)

Language
- Spoken: English, North Antiguan Creole

St. John's is the most populous city in Antigua and Barbuda, being home to about a third of the country's population in 2011. The city has one of the highest immigrant populations in the country, with nearly 40% of the city being foreign-born. It is the primary city in the Central Plain region and is one of the largest cities of the Leeward Islands. With 24,451 people in 2011, it is the country's primate city.

St. John's is the centre of immigration to Antigua and Barbuda. In 2011, it had a foreign born population of 8,082, one of the largest immigrant populations by size for any eastern Caribbean city. It contains significant populations of Guyanese people (10%), Jamaicans (6%), persons from the Dominican Republic (6%), and persons from Dominica (6%). 25% of the city's residents are not Antiguan and Barbudan citizens. The city is the origin point of North Antiguan Creole, the most widely spoken variety of the Antiguan and Barbudan Creole language.

St. John's is home to the majority of Hispanic Antiguans and Barbudans, with Indians and Syrian and Lebanese people also having a major presence. Most of the city are African descendants, which is also the ethnic identity of the majority of the immigrant population.

While the city has attracted many people from abroad, St. John's is one of the most impoverished locations in the country. Neighbourhoods such as Gray's Farm are known to struggle with crime. Living conditions in the city are also below the national average, with a 2007 report stating that 22% of the population lived in poverty. However, the presence of jobs continues to attract residents from rural areas and those abroad. The city had a very high human development index of 0.835 in 2023, significantly below the Saint John parish average of 0.848.

== Population size ==
Prior to the laying out of the city, there was a small cluster of houses around St. John's Harbour, then known as "the Cove". St. John's was a planned city, with construction being authorized in April 1668. St. John's eventually became an official place of trade in 1675 and by 1689, the city was as large as the previous headtown, Falmouth. The establishment of St. John's Cathedral quickly elevated the town to the unchallenged centre of the parish, allowing for political and economic growth. In 1856, St. John's was mentioned as having a population of 8,515– 3,474 men and 5,041 women. This accounted for the vast majority of the parish's population. There were 779 homes in the city: 365 tenancy at will, 150 leasehold, and 264 freehold.

In 1970, the city had a population of 22,153– 10,309 men and 11,844 women. By 1991, the population had declined to 21,514, and in 2001 the city's population peaked at 24,451. In 2011 the city had a population of about 22,219, including 10,697 men and 11,522 women. The decrease in population has been blamed on middle class flight from the city centre, with suburban areas near St. John's seeing population increases of up to 40 percent between 2001 and 2011.

== Immigration ==
Top 10 most common foreign birth places (Note: Excludes "not stated" and regionally grouped countries)
Country	Population
Guyana	2,249
Jamaica	1,374
Dominican Republic	1,223
Dominica	1,209
United States	340
Montserrat	223
Saint Lucia	169
Saint Vincent and the Grenadines	152
Syria	101
Trinidad and Tobago	93

St. John's is the centre of immigration to Antigua and Barbuda. In 2011, just 63% of the population was born in the country, compared to the national average of about 70%. While all major immigrant groups in the country are represented in the city, most immigrants to the city tend to be from countries that are less developed than Antigua and Barbuda. The largest immigrant group in the city are Guyanese people at about 10%, followed by Jamaicans (6%), people of Dominican Republic origin (6%), people from Dominica (6%), with smaller minorities of people born in the United States (2%) and Montserratians (1%). Most other immigrants to the city come from other Caribbean islands. Of Antigua and Barbuda-born people in the city, 12% of them (about 1,590 people) are returning nationals. Edward Street has the highest foreign born population in the city by proportion, with just 38% of residents being born in Antigua and Barbuda.

76.46% of the city's residents (16,548 people) had Antiguan and Barbudan citizenship. About 7% of the city's residents listed Guyana as their primary citizenship, 5% listed Jamaica, 4% listed the Dominican Republic, and 3% listed Dominica. Persons were also allowed to list a second nationality, (Note: Antiguan and Barbudan citizenship must be listed as one's primary nationality) with 3,460 people choosing to designate one. Of this minority, 23% listed Guyanese citizenship, 18% Dominica, 13% United States, and 12% the Dominican Republic, with the remainder mostly following country of birth patterns.

As of 2011, 72% of foreign born people in the city are of African ethnicity, 15% are Hispanic, 6% are other mixed, and about 3% are Indian, with smaller minorities making up the remainder. This is in contrast to people born in Antigua and Barbuda in the city: 93% are African descendants, 4% are other mixed, and only about 1% are Hispanic. Of working age foreign-born people (aged 18–59), 76% had a job and worked (compared to 72% of Antigua and Barbuda-born people). An additional 6% had home duties (e.g. stay-at-home parents) and 4% were pursuing education. 8% were seeking a new job, and 1% were entry-level employees searching for their first job. 0.45% of these working aged people were retired and 0.62% were disabled.

== Ethnicity ==
As of 2011, the largest ethnic group in the city are African descendants at 84.86% of the population (18,366 people). Other major ethnic groups include Hispanic people (6.28%), other mixed (4.36%), East Indians (1.30%), other (0.93%), Syrian or Lebanese (0.71%), unknown (0.68%), mixed black/white (0.66%), and white (0.22%).

Most African descendant people in the city (68%) were born in Antigua and Barbuda. This is about 5% lower than the national average of 72%. Most immigrants in the city are of African descent. 9.75% of black people in the city were born in Guyana, 7.14% in Jamaica, and 5.83% in Dominica. Most black immigrants to the city tend to be from other Anglophone Caribbean countries. In terms of proportion, Downtown St. John's had the lowest African population proportion at 55% of the population.

Virtually all Hispanic people in the city were born in the Dominican Republic (76.51%), with 14.88% being born in Antigua and Barbuda and 4.11% being born in "unclassified Caribbean countries". Only a very small amount (about 1%) were born in Hispanic countries on the American mainland. St. Johnston (East) had the highest Hispanic population proportion in the city at 27.53% of the population.

Most ethnic Indian immigrants to the city were born in Guyana (68.80%), with 16.17% being born in Antigua and Barbuda and 6.77% being born in unclassified Asian countries, namely those on the Indian subcontinent. Most others came from smaller Indo-Caribbean communities on the surrounding islands. Botanical Gardens (aka. Holberton) had the highest Indian percentage at 6.64% of the population.

== Religion ==
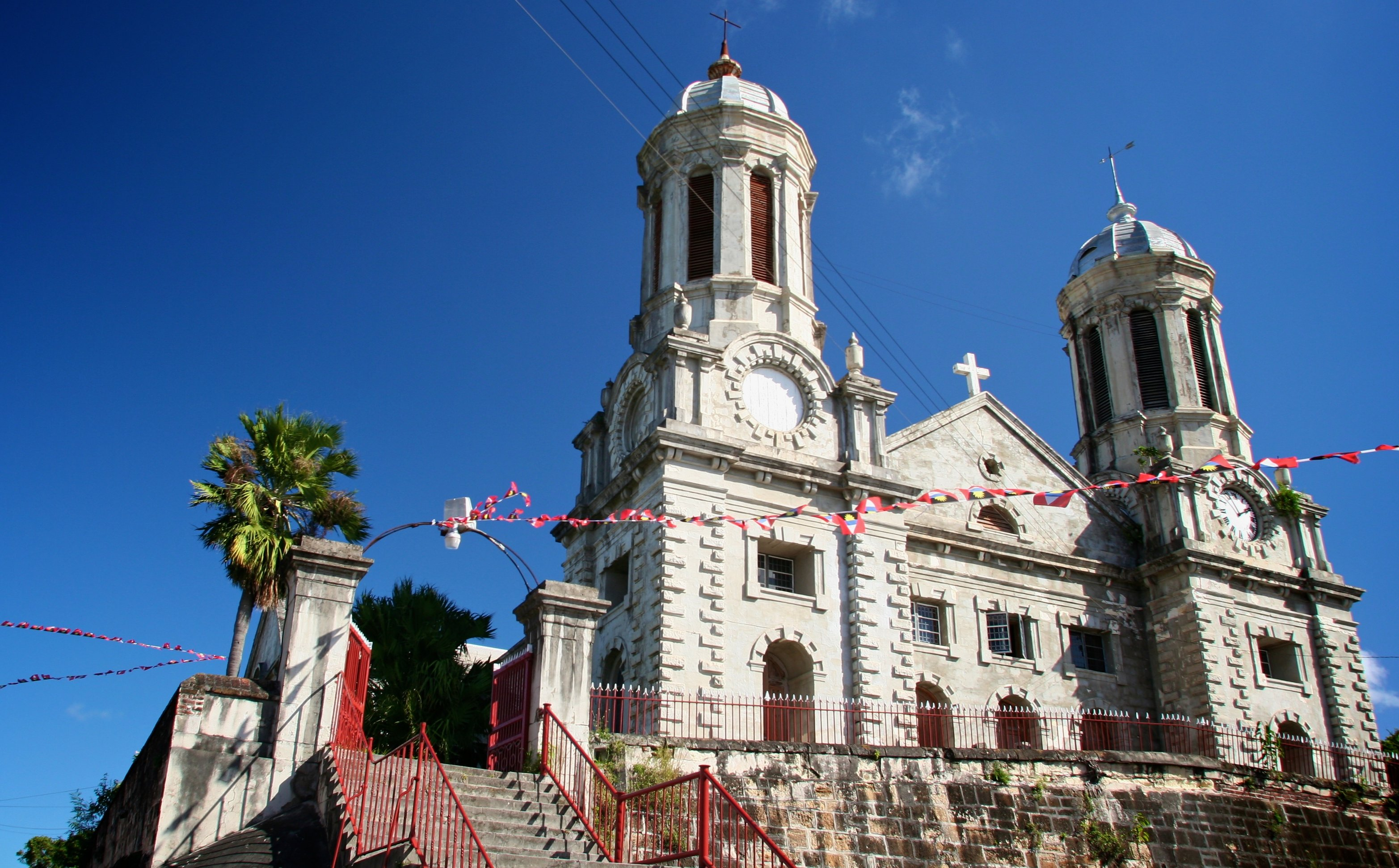
St. John's Cathedral

Most people in the city are Christian. The largest Christian denomination in the city are Anglicans, with 16% of St. Johnstonians identifying with the group. Other major denominations include Pentecostalists (15%), Seventh-day Adventists (10%) and Catholics (10%). The city has one of the highest percentages of irreligious people in the country at nearly 8%. 1% of the city identified as Rastafarian.

The most well known church in the city is St. John's Cathedral, which dominates the city skyline and attracts many of the island's tourists. The Holy Family Cathedral is the centre of the Diocese of St. John's–Basseterre.

== Housing and living conditions ==
In 2011, the city had a total of 7,879 households. Like the rest of Antigua, sheet metal (91.23%) was the most common roofing material. Other popular roofing materials included unclassified shingles (3.64%), asphalt shingles (2.28%), and concrete (2.11%). 53.33% of homes in the city used wood for their outer walls. Wood and concrete (17.78%), concrete (13.49%), and concrete blocks (10.09%) were also common. 80% of homes were detached, 9% were flats, apartments, or condos, 4% of households were part of a larger private house, and 3% were business-dwellings. 41.64% of homes were rented privately, 41.11% were owned outright, and 6.56% were owned with a mortgage.

Living conditions in the city are below the national average. St. John's is one of the poorest locations in the country, with about 22% of the city living in poverty as of 2007. The 2011 census collected information on unmet (or unfulfilled) basic needs (UBNs): 10.95% of people in the city did not have adequate housing, 0.87 had a poor water supply, 0.47% had a UBN for sanitation, 0.71% for fuel, 1.20% for light, 0.24% for refuse collection, and 1.31% for information. 14.47% of residents had at least 1 UBN, 1.11% had 2 or more, and 0.16% had three or more.

In 2007, 66% of the population was "non-poor", 11% were vulnerable, 16% were classified as poor, and 6.3% as indigent. Out of all statistical regions in the country, St. John's had the highest percentage of indigent people and the second highest percentage of poor people behind Saint Philip. Almost 40% of low income people in the country lived in the city. 17.5% of Antiguan and Barbudan students receiving free or discounted school meals lived in the city. 71.4% of people in the city had running water every day of the week, slightly above the national average of 68%. Upper Gambles had the highest living conditions index in the city, with a comparable quality of life to that of Dow Hill or Carlisle. The enumeration district with the lowest quality of life was Central Street (North), and the most deprived major division in the city was Greenbay.

In 2008, a survey of 754 households in the city found that 21% of households made under XCD$2,000 per month, 47% made between $2,000 and $5,000 per month, 7% made between $5,000 and $10,000, and 0.5% made over $10,000 monthly, with about 24% not knowing or not stating. The lowest-income neighbourhood in the city was Martins Road (East), and the highest income neighbourhood in the city was Upper Gambles.
