= Collin's Estate =

Official historic site of Antigua and Barbuda

- Location within Antigua and Barbuda
- 17°4′22.5″N 61°43′49.9″W
- Location: Saint Philip, Antigua and Barbuda

History
- Built: 1750s

National Cultural Heritage of Antigua and Barbuda

Collin's Estate is an official historic site in Saint Philip, Antigua and Barbuda, established in the 1750s with a buff house built in 1813. It was a sugar mill and eventually converted to steam technology. At the time of emancipation in 1833, 152 people were enslaved at the estate. A 2015 investigation of the site stated that it had been overtaken by bush.

It is located in the village of Long Lane–Collins.
