= Colebrook's Estate =

Official historic site of Antigua and Barbuda

- Location within Antigua and Barbuda
- 17°3′13.6″N 61°42′21.3″W
- Location: Saint Philip, Antigua and Barbuda

History
- Built: 1738

National Cultural Heritage of Antigua and Barbuda

Colebrook's Estate is an official historic site in Saint Philip, Antigua and Barbuda. It was a sugar mill built in 1738 and never adopted steam technology. It was purchased by the Antigua Distillery in 1944 to produce molasses for cavalier rum. Freetown resident David Edwards said in the 1930s the estate was also the first cotton ginnery in the region.
