= Glanville's Estate =

Official historic site of Antigua and Barbuda

Glanville's
- Location within Antigua and Barbuda
- 17°5′40.5″N 61°43′16.9″W
- Location: Saint Philip, Antigua and Barbuda

History
- Built: 1710

National Cultural Heritage of Antigua and Barbuda

Glanville's is an official historic site and former sugar plantation in Saint Philip, Antigua and Barbuda. As of a 2015 expedition, the site is surrounded by vegetation. The site also has a cemetery where many of the lepers in Antigua were buried. At the time of emancipation, 111 people were enslaved at the estate.
