= Archbold's Estate =

Official historic site of Antigua and Barbuda

Archbold's
- Location within Antigua and Barbuda
- 17°3′44.7″N 61°42′36.9″W
- Location: Saint Philip, Antigua and Barbuda

History
- Built: 1750

National Cultural Heritage of Antigua and Barbuda

Archbold's is an official historic site and former sugar estate in Saint Philip, Antigua and Barbuda. It was founded in the 1750s by Joshua Archbold and its sugar tower continues to stand in what is now an underdeveloped forest. The estate was used to raise cattle and to produce molasses to make cavalier rum. In 1829, 239 people were enslaved at the estate along with Brown's Bay.
