= Elliott's Estate =

Official historic site of Antigua and Barbuda

Elliott's
- Location within Antigua and Barbuda
- 17°4′47.3″N 61°44′13.8″W
- Location: Saint Philip, Antigua and Barbuda

History
- Built: 1668

National Cultural Heritage of Antigua and Barbuda

Elliott's is an official historic site in Saint Philip, Antigua and Barbuda. It was also known as French's and contained a mill tower and plantation house. It was founded in 1668 and was partially destroyed by a fire during the production of the movie Fire Power. The plantation house was restored in 1999 and at the time of emancipation enslaved 226 people.
