= Elme's Creek =

Official historic site of Antigua and Barbuda

- Location within Antigua and Barbuda
- 17°3′41.2″N 61°43′26.5″W
- Location: Saint Philip, Antigua and Barbuda

History
- Built: 4 March 1667

National Cultural Heritage of Antigua and Barbuda

Elme's Creek is an official historic site and former sugar estate in Saint Philip, Antigua and Barbuda. It was granted to Thomas Elmes on 4 March 1667 and was part of the larger Gaynor's estate where all sugar was processed as the estate converted to steam in the 1800s. An assessment in 2014 revealed it was covered in bush. At the time of emancipation 103 people were enslaved at the estate.
