= Saint Philip Parish =

Saint Philip Parish may refer to:

- Saint Philip Parish, Antigua and Barbuda
- Saint Philip Parish, Barbados
