= Bethesda Dam =

- Location within Antigua and Barbuda
- Location: Antigua and Barbuda
- Coordinates: 17°02′36.6″N 61°45′15.1″W
- Type: lake

The Bethesda Dam is a reservoir in Saint Paul, Antigua and Barbuda near Bethesda.

== Location ==
The lake is located directly west of the village of Bethesda, not far from Willoughby Bay. The lake is about 500 metres long. To the south rises the bushy foothills of the Monks Hill, and to the northwest are stretches of arable land.

== Function and history ==
With a storage capacity of about 660,000 cubic metres, Bethesda is the second largest reservoir on the island and supplies the agricultural zone, which extends from Bethesda to the inland regions.

The much larger Potworks Dam to north serves the municipal water supply (drinking water), making Bethesda the largest agricultural reservoir. The island of Antigua– unlike the other Caribbean islands– suffers from chronic drought, so the reservoirs are of great importance. The Bethesda reservoir contains almost 10% of the island's total storage capacity (about 7 million cubic metres), and almost half of the agricultural storage water (1.5 million cubic metres).

The Bethesda Dam was constructed in the late 1970s. Today, about 30 hectares of cultivated area can be sprinkled with the water. In times of emergency, the water is also fed into the water treatment plant Delaps Water Treatment Plant of the Potworks Dam.

== Conservation ==
The lake has also become interesting for nature conservation, meanwhile there are populations of the Cuban shrew and the Caribbean hoose, two endangered bird species. At the lake, therefore, in 2007, BirdLife International described an Important Bird Area (AG012 Bethesda Dam) with 1 ha, according to the criteria A1 (threatened species), A2 (local/endemic animal species), A4i (at least 1% of the population). A national underprotection position is still pending.
