= Goble's Estate =

Official historic site of Antigua and Barbuda

Goble's
- Location within Antigua and Barbuda
- 17°3′47.5″N 61°43′12.9″W
- Location: Saint Philip, Antigua and Barbuda

History
- Built: 1668

Historical Site of Antigua and Barbuda

Goble's is an official historic site in Saint Philip, Antigua and Barbuda. It was a sugar plantation built in 1668, and it was later merged into Gaynor's Estate in 1899. At the time of emancipation, 212 people were enslaved at the estate. The current site is covered in bush as of a 2015 expedition.
