= Crossroads Guitar Festival =

Music festival founded by Eric Clapton

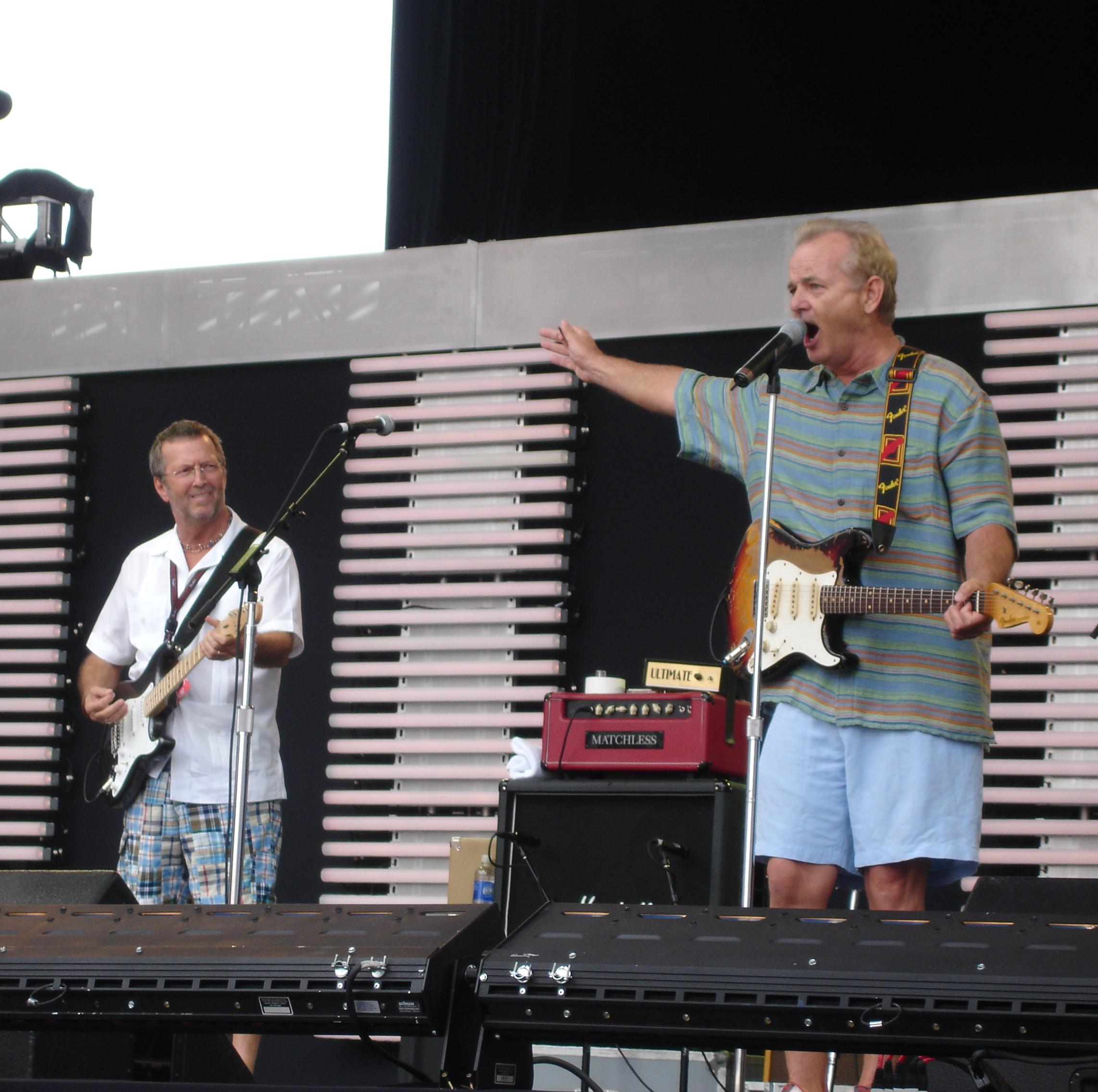
- Eric Clapton and Bill Murray kicking off the Crossroads Guitar Festival in 2007
- Genre: Blues, country, rock, bluegrass
- Dates: Summer
- Locations: 1999: New York City; 2004: Dallas, Texas; 2007, 2010: Bridgeview, Illinois; 2013: New York, NY; 2019: Dallas, Texas; 2023: Los Angeles, California; 2026: Austin, Texas
- Years active: 1999, 2004, 2007, 2010, 2013, 2019, 2023, 2026
- Founders: Eric Clapton
- Website: crossroadsguitarfestival.org

The Crossroads Guitar Festival is a series of music festivals and benefit concerts founded by Eric Clapton. The festivals benefit the Crossroads Centre founded by Eric Clapton, a drug treatment center near St. Philip's, Antigua. The concerts showcase a variety of guitarists, selected by Eric Clapton personally. To the 2007 audience, Clapton declared that each performer was one of the very best, and had earned his personal respect.

The first concert was held on June 30, 1999, at Madison Square Garden in New York City, and there again in 2013. The 2004 concert was held at the Cotton Bowl in Dallas, while the 2007 and 2010 festivals were held at Toyota Park, Bridgeview, Illinois, just outside Chicago. The festival returned to Dallas in 2019 at the American Airlines Center.

== 1999 festival ==
The first Crossroads Benefit concert was held at Madison Square Garden, New York on June 30, 1999. It was held under a different title which was Eric Clapton & Friends In Concert: A Benefit For The Crossroads Centre At Antigua. The first official Crossroads Guitar Festival did not happen until 2004.

=== Performers ===
Some performers at the 1999 Concert were David Sanborn, Sheryl Crow, Bob Dylan and Mary J Blige. Backup musicians included Nathan East (bass), Steve Gadd (drums) Andy Fairweather Low (guitars), Tim Carmon (keyboards) and Dave Delhomme (keyboards). Back-up vocals were by Tessa Niles and Katie Kissoon.

== 2004 festival ==
Held at Cotton Bowl stadium in Dallas, Texas, from June 4, 2004, to June 6, 2004. A two-disc DVD containing 250 minutes of footage of the 2004 concert was released in the same year. This became the first official Crossroads Guitar Festival because the 1999 concert had a different title; it was the first benefit concert under the Crossroads Guitar Festival name.

=== Performers ===
Some performers at the Crossroads Guitar Festival such as Jeff Beck, Pat Metheny, Neal Schon, and Styx were not included on the DVD.

- Eric Clapton
- Johnny A.
- Vishwa Mohan Bhatt
- Ron Block
- Joe Bonamassa
- Booker T. & the M.G.'s
- Doyle Bramhall II
- JJ Cale
- Larry Carlton
- Robert Cray
- Steve Cropper
- Sheryl Crow
- Bo Diddley
- Jerry Douglas
- David Honeyboy Edwards
- Rocky Frisco
- Vince Gill
- Buddy Guy
- David Hidalgo
- Zakir Hussain
- Eric Johnson
- B.B. King
- Sonny Landreth
- Jonny Lang
- Robert Lockwood, Jr.
- John Mayer
- John McLaughlin
- Robert Randolph
- Duke Robillard
- Carlos Santana
- Hubert Sumlin
- James Taylor
- Susan Tedeschi
- Derek Trucks
- Dan Tyminski
- Steve Vai
- Jimmie Vaughan
- Joe Walsh
- ZZ Top
- David Johansen

== 2007 festival ==
The 2007 Crossroads Guitar Festival was held at Toyota Park in Bridgeview, Illinois on July 28, 2007. Tickets were estimated as sold out for the 28,000 capacity park in twenty two minutes. A DVD of the concert was released on November 20, 2007.

=== Performers ===
Eric Clapton played alongside various performers, and there were many one-off collaborations during the show. In order of appearance, the performers on the main stage were

- Bill Murray
- Sonny Landreth
- John McLaughlin
- Alison Krauss and Union Station featuring Jerry Douglas
- Doyle Bramhall II
- The Derek Trucks Band
  - joined by Susan Tedeschi and Johnny Winter
- Robert Randolph and the Family Band
- The Robert Cray Band
  - joined by Jimmie Vaughan, Hubert Sumlin, and B. B. King
- Aaron Loesch (winner of Guitar Center's 2007 King of the Blues contest)
- John Mayer
- Vince Gill
  - joined by Albert Lee, Sheryl Crow, Peter Stroud and Willie Nelson
- Los Lobos
- Jeff Beck with Tal Wilkenfeld, Vinnie Colaiuta, and Jason Rebello
- Eric Clapton
  - joined by Robbie Robertson and Steve Winwood
- Buddy Guy
- Finale featuring Buddy Guy with Eric Clapton, Robert Cray, John Mayer, Hubert Sumlin, Johnny Winter, and Jimmie Vaughan

On the second stage at the Festival Village, performers included:

- Orianthi
- Harvey Mandel
- Jedd Hughes
- Pete Huttlinger
- Tab Benoit and Louisiana's LeRoux
- Jeff Baxter
- Todd Wolfe
- Tyler Bryant
- Flophouse

== 2010 festival ==
The 2010 Crossroads festival was again held at Toyota Park in Bridgeview, IL (outside Chicago) on June 26, 2010.

=== Performers ===
In order of appearance. Artists in bold have received star billing in advertisements. Comedian Bill Murray MC’d.

- Kirby Kelley (winner of Guitar Center's 2009 King of the Blues contest)
- Sonny Landreth (Note: artists who also performed at the 2004 festival) (Note: artists who also performed at the 2007 festival)
- Robert Randolph and the Family Band joined by Joe Bonamassa and Pino Daniele
- The Robert Cray Band with Jimmie Vaughan and Hubert Sumlin
- Bert Jansch
- Stefan Grossman joined by Keb' Mo'
- ZZ Top
- Doyle Bramhall II and Faded Boogie joined by Gary Clark, Jr. and Sheryl Crow and Derek Trucks and Susan Tedeschi
- Vince Gill joined by Albert Lee, James Burton, and Keb' Mo'
- Citizen Cope joined by Sheryl Crow
- Earl Klugh with Yonrico Scott and Joseph Patrick Moore
- John Mayer Trio
- Buddy Guy with Jonny Lang and Ronnie Wood
- The Derek Trucks and Susan Tedeschi Band joined by Warren Haynes, Sheryl Crow, David Hidalgo, Cesar Rosas, and Johnny Winter (This set replaced the originally scheduled Allman Brothers Band.)
- Jeff Beck with Rhonda Smith, Narada Michael Walden, and Jason Rebello
- Eric Clapton with Steve Winwood joined by Citizen Cope and Jeff Beck
- B. B. King with The Robert Cray Band, Jimmie Vaughan and Eric Clapton
- Finale set with many artists returning for a performance of "Sweet Home Chicago"

== 2013 festival ==
The 2013 festival was held April 12–13 at Madison Square Garden in New York City.

=== Performers ===
Performers included:

- Albert Lee
- Alice Smith
- Allan Holdsworth
- Allman Brothers Band
- Andy Fairweather Low
- B.B. King
- Beth Hart
- Blake Mills
- Booker T
- Buddy Guy
- Citizen Cope
- Dave Biller
- Derek Trucks
- Doyle Bramhall II
- Earl Klugh
- Eric Clapton
- Gary Clark Jr.
- Jeff Beck
- Jimmie Vaughan
- John Mayer
- John Scofield
- Keb' Mo'
- Keith Richards
- Keith Urban
- Kurt Rosenwinkel
- Los Lobos
- Matt Murphy
- Paul Carrack
- Quinn Sullivan
- Robbie Robertson
- Robert Cray
- Robert Randolph
- Sonny Landreth
- Steve Cropper
- Taj Mahal
- Vince Gill

== 2019 festival ==
The 2019 festival was held on September 20–21 at the American Airlines Center in Dallas, Texas.

MC: Bill Murray

=== Performers ===
Performers included:

- Alan Darby
- Albert Lee
- Andy Fairweather Low
- Artur Menezes
- Billy Gibbons
- Bonnie Raitt
- Bradley Walker
- Buddy Guy Band
- Daniel Santiago
- Derek Trucks
- Doyle Bramhall II
- Eric Clapton
- Gary Clark Jr.
- Gustavo Santaolalla
- James Bay
- Jeff Beck
- Jerry Douglas
- Jimmie Vaughan
- Joe Walsh
- John Mayer
- Jonny Lang
- Keb' Mo'
- Kurt Rosenwinkel
- Lianne La Havas
- Los Lobos
- Pedro Martins
- Peter Frampton
- Robert Cray
- Robert Randolph
- Sheryl Crow
- Sonny Landreth
- Susan Tedeschi
- Tom Misch
- Vince Gill
- Citizen Cope
- The Marcus King Band

Outdoor Venue: Among the Village Stage performers will be surprise main stage artists, along with special guest guitarists such as Eric Johnson, Joe Robinson, Andy Timmons, Paul Reed Smith, Boscoe France, Bryan Ewald, Ryan McGarvey and Peterson Brothers, with others. In addition, next-gen guitarists Jacob Reese Thorton and Brotherhood of the Guitar, the Ernie Ball Play Crossroads national contest winner, and Gibson’s G3 trio will make their Crossroads debut on the Village stage.

== 2023 festival ==
A 2023 edition of the festival was held on September 23–24 at the Crypto.com Arena in Downtown Los Angeles.

=== Performers ===
- Joe Bonamassa
- Doyle Bramhall II
- James Bullard
- Eric Clapton
- Gary Clark Jr.
- Judith Hill
- Sheryl Crow
- Jerry Douglas
- Jakob Dylan
- Andy Fairweather Low
- Samantha Fish
- Eric Gales
- Vince Gill
- Ben Haggard
- H.E.R.
- Sierra Hull
- Christone "Kingfish" Ingram
- Marcus King
- The Bros. Landreth
- Sonny Landreth
- Albert Lee
- Los Lobos
- Taj Mahal
- Pedro Martins
- John Mayer Trio
- John McLaughlin
- Del McCoury Band
- Roger McGuinn
- Keb' Mo'
- Ariel Posen
- Robert Randolph
- Kurt Rosenwinkel
- Santana
- Gustavo Santaolalla
- Daniel Santiago
- Stephen Stills
- Molly Tuttle
- Jimmie Vaughan
- Bradley Walker
- Stevie Wonder
- The War on Drugs
- ZZ Top

Buddy Guy and Robbie Robertson were both announced on the lineup. However, Guy canceled his performance on September 19 because of a medical issue and Robbie Robertson died on August 9, six weeks prior to the festival.

== 2026 festival ==
A 2026 edition of the festival was held on September 26–27 at the Moody Center in Austin, Texas.

=== Performers ===
- Trey Anastasio
- Joe Bonamassa
- Doyle Bramhall II
- Elle Bramhall
- Brothers of the Heart
- Eric Clapton
- Nathan East
- Noah East
- Gary Clark Jr.
- Tommy Emmanuel
- Sonny Emory
- Eric Gales
- Billy Gibbons
- Buddy Guy
- Ben Haggard
- Sierra Hull
- Will Johns
- Marcus King
- Marvin King
- Sonny Landreth
- Julian Lage
- Taj Mahal
- Pedro Martins
- John Mayer
- Del McCoury Band
- John McLaughlin
- Keb' Mo'
- Amelia Powell
- Dirk Powell
- Robert Randolph
- Kurt Rosenwinkel
- Daniel Santiago
- Charlie Sexton
- Drew Smithers
- Tedeschi Trucks Band
- Jimmie Vaughan
