= Nonsuch Bay =

Nonsuch Bay may refer to:

- Nonsuch Bay, Antigua and Barbuda
- Nonsuch Bay, Bermuda, Nonsuch Island
