= Grant's Estate =

Official historic site of Antigua and Barbuda

Grant's
- Location within Antigua and Barbuda
- 17°5′28.0″N 61°42′59.3″W
- Location: Saint Philip, Antigua and Barbuda

History
- Built: 1750

National Cultural Heritage of Antigua and Barbuda

Grant's is an official historic site in Saint Philip, Antigua and Barbuda. It was built in 1750 and was a sugar estate that never converted to steam technology. As of a 2015 expedition, the site is in decay, and combined with a nearby plantation, likely enslaved a maximum of 272 people at the time of emancipation.
