= Long Lane Estate =

Official historic site of Antigua and Barbuda

Long Lane
- Location within Antigua and Barbuda
- 17°04′06.16″N 61°44′28.74″W
- Location: Saint Philip, Antigua and Barbuda

History
- Built: 1750

Historical Site of Antigua and Barbuda

Long Lane is an official historic site in Saint Philip, Antigua and Barbuda. It was a sugar plantation established in 1750. The sugar mill tower continues to stand. 170 people were enslaved here at the time of emancipation.

It is located in the village of Long Lane–Collins.
