= Willoughby Bay =

Willoughby Bay may refer to the following places:

- Willoughby Bay, adjacent to Willoughby Spit, Virginia, United States
- Willoughby Bay (Antigua)
