= Ffryes Estate, Saint Philip =

Official historic site of Antigua and Barbuda

Ffryes
- Location within Antigua and Barbuda
- 17°2′57.5″N 61°43′50.5″W
- Location: Saint Philip, Antigua and Barbuda

History
- Built: 1665

National Cultural Heritage of Antigua and Barbuda

Ffryes (or Ffrye's or Ffrye's Estate) is an official historic site and former sugar estate located in the west of Saint Philip, Antigua and Barbuda. It was established by John Frye in 1665 and is now a ruin located outside the village of St. Philip's. It was also used to raise cattle and sheep. At the time of emancipation 86 people were enslaved at the estate.
