= Skerretts, Saint Philip =

Official historic site of Antigua and Barbuda

Skerretts
- Location within Antigua and Barbuda
- 17°03′33.42″N 61°42′03.36″W
- Location: Saint Philip, Antigua and Barbuda

History
- Built: 1705

Historical Site of Antigua and Barbuda

Skerretts, also known as Folly or Nugent's, is an official historic site in Saint Philip, Antigua and Barbuda. It was a sugar plantation established in 1705. The sugar mill tower continues to stand. 178 people were enslaved here at the time of emancipation.
