= Potworks Dam =

Coordinates: 17°03′51″N 61°44′55″W

Potworks Dam is a reservoir in central Antigua, near Bethesda. One of the most significant water treatment facilities on the island is located on the southern shore at the Delaps Water Treatment Plant.

== History ==
The dam has the name of a ceramics company. This area was a sugar cane farm owned by the Codrington family, one of the prominent planter families, constructed between the 18th and the 20th centuries. The potters created clay berets to be exported with molasses- the area touches Willoughby Bay to the southeast of St. John's Harbour and is part of the island's heavy clay soil zone.

In order to stop recurrent water emergencies, the storage facility was constructed in the late 1960s. A 19th-century bridge across Ayers Creek and portions of the manufacturing buildings were covered by the dam when it was constructed. A sudden exceptional downpour occurred just prior to the barrier's completion in 1968, preventing the seabed from being ready. The building could open in May 1970; this is marked by a memorial plaque.

The dam showed its worth in 1974, when there was a severe drought that lasted from January to mid-August. But in the midst of the disastrous 21-month drought that occurred in 1983–1985, the lake finally dried up in late 1984. This led to the total collapse of the water supply, necessitating the transportation of drinking water from nearby islands. This ought to stop now that seawater desalination has taken place.

The dam occasionally fills up after major storms, for example during February 2024.

== Functions ==
=== Potworks Reservoir ===
The lake is approximately 2½ kilometers long, 130 hectares in size, and can hold approximately 4 million m^{3} of water. It is the Caribbean's largest reservoir as a result. It supplies the island's drinking water supply, which is affected by drought, in contrast to other Caribbean islands. About 7 million m^{3}, or 2/3 of the island's entire water storage capacity, is contained in the Potworks reservoir. The watershed area is 2,430 hectares, or 24 square km.

Other than the reservoir, the island gets its water from several tiny cisterns and household fountains, as well as from saltwater desalination plants such Semibcorp Antigua, Camp Blizzard, and Ffryes Beach.

=== Delaps Water Treatment Plant ===
The Delaps Water Treatment Plant, located south of the lake and across from Bethesda, receives the water supply. It undergoes reversosmotically treated there before being put into the island's water network. With the half-powerful Bendals Water Treatment Plant (Dunnings Dam) and a few smaller plants, the surface water treatment plants account for 1/3 of the island's current daily requirement. The plant produces 7,000 m^{3} per day, or around 20% of the total.

Water also flows via Delaps to the smaller Collins Reservoir below Ayers Creek and, if needed, to the agriculturally-oriented Bethesda Dam south of Willoughby Bay.

== See also ==
- Category:Antigua
