= The Hope, Saint Philip =

Official historic site of Antigua and Barbuda

The Hope
- Location within Antigua and Barbuda
- 17°02′27.19″N 61°43′05.71″W
- Location: Saint Philip, Antigua and Barbuda

History
- Built: c. 1829

Historical Site of Antigua and Barbuda

The Hope is an official historic site in Saint Philip, Antigua and Barbuda. It was a sugar plantation established around 1829. The sugar mill tower continues to stand. 114 people were enslaved here at the time of emancipation.
