= Brown's Bay Estate =

Official historic site of Antigua and Barbuda

Brown's Bay
- Location within Antigua and Barbuda
- 17°4′1.3″N 61°41′45.7″W
- Location: Saint Philip, Antigua and Barbuda

History
- Built: 1716

National Cultural Heritage of Antigua and Barbuda

Brown's Bay Estate, also known as Harmony Hall, is an official historic site in Saint Philip, Antigua and Barbuda. It is sometimes combined with Archbold's Estate, and was built in 1716 to produce sugar and raise cattle. The mill is now a tourist destination with a restaurant, marina, and art gallery.
