= Lynch's Estate =

Official historic site of Antigua and Barbuda

Lynch's
- Location within Antigua and Barbuda
- 17°02′08.76″N 61°42′47.87″W
- Location: Saint Philip, Antigua and Barbuda

History
- Built: 1693

Historical Site of Antigua and Barbuda

Lynch's is an official historic site in Saint Philip, Antigua and Barbuda. It was a sugar plantation established in 1693. The sugar mill tower no longer stands. 331 people were enslaved here at the time of emancipation.
