= Sherfield Bowen =

Antiguan politician

Member of the House of Representatives of Antigua and Barbuda
- In office 18 January 2023 – 1 April 2026
- Preceded by: Lennox Weston
- Constituency: St. Philip's South
- Majority: 57.57% (2023)
- In office 9 March 1999 – 26 February 2004
- Preceded by: Willmoth Daniel
- Succeeded by: Willmoth Daniel
- Constituency: St. Philip's South
- Majority: 50.34% (1999)

Deputy Leader of the United Progressive Party
- Incumbent
- Assumed office 21 May 2024

Personal details
- Party: United Progressive Party
- Other political affiliations: Antigua Labour Party (former)

Sherfield Bowen, born 1959, is an Antiguan United Progressive Party politician, who was elected as Member of Parliament for St. Philip's South in the election held on 18 January 2023. Bowen is the deputy leader of the party.

Bowen also served as a Member of Parliament for one term from 1999 to 2004, where he was the Deputy Speaker of the House.

Bowen was convicted of manslaughter in 2005; however he was released on appeal in 2007.
