= Freetown, Antigua and Barbuda =

Village in Antigua

Freetown
- Village
- Interactive map of the Freetown main place
- Location within Antigua and Barbuda
- Coordinates: 17°02′50.05″N 61°42′16.31″W
- Country: Antigua and Barbuda
- Island: Antigua
- Parish: Saint Philip Parish
- Established: 1834

Government
  - Type: Village Council (possibly dissolved)

Area
  - Total: 1 km^{2} (0.39 sq mi)

Population (2011)
  - Total: 609
- Demonym: Freetownian
- Time zone: UTC-4 (AST)

Freetown is a village in Antigua. It is located in the southeast of the island, on a peninsula between Willoughby Bay to the south and Nonsuch Bay to the north.

== History ==
The settlement arose in the course of the abolition of slavery in 1834, when numerous freedmen settled here on Farrs Hill, where there was a public water pond. After Liberta, Freetown was the second free village, the origin of its name. The place had a population boom as early as 1843. After the great Caribbean earthquake, the settlement on Willoughby Bay (Bridgetown) was abandoned, the inhabitants there moved to Bethesda and Freetown. The Methodists, who had been based in Bethesda since 1813, had built a small chapel and a school in Freetown in 1841 when they moved the congregation from Willoughby Bay to Bethesda. This was also destroyed in the quake, and a larger mission house was built by 1847.

The place grew rapidly– around 1855 it was the largest freedmen's village on the island at about two to three thousand people. In 1882, the church was rebuilt and dedicated to the 'glory of God'. Until the 1960s, the Methodists ran the only school on site, then a state school was established.

With the economic upheaval brought on by the 20th century's end to colonialism and independence, the population gradually declined throughout the nineteenth century. The area is now a modest, self-sufficient agricultural community with a developed structure, but it contrasts sharply with the eastern noble, contained hotel and villa area between Half Moon Bay and Mill Reef, which is popular with tourists from other countries. Only the road from Newfield leads to the village, which then terminates at the Mill-Reef region at the tip of the peninsula. To reach Nonsuch Bay and Harmony Hall, a terrible road splits off. Today, the town has a small hospital (Freetown Clinic), the nearby Crossroads Centre, an alcohol and drug rehabilitation center, a police station, a primary school (Freetown Primary School), as well as a Methodist church.

== Geography ==
It is a sparsely populated area with one beach – Half Moon Bay with its beautiful white and pink sand. Freetown has an area of 1 square kilometre.

== Climate ==
Freetown is often ranked as the coldest town in Antigua and Barbuda, often achieving low temperatures below 15 degrees Celsius in the winter.

== Demographics ==
Freetown has four enumeration districts.

- 60600 FreeTown-North
- 60700 FreeTown-West
- 60800 FreeTown-South

=== Census data ===
Ethnic
Q48 Ethnic	Counts	%
African descendent	587	96.33%
Mixed (Other)	8	1.35%
Hispanic	1	0.19%
Other	2	0.39%
Don't know/Not stated	11	1.74%
Total	609	100.00%

Religion
Q49 Religion	Counts	%
Adventist	78	12.87%
Anglican	185	30.60%
Baptist	16	2.73%
Church of God	38	6.24%
Evangelical	5	0.78%
Jehovah Witness	1	0.19%
Methodist	165	27.29%
Moravian	4	0.58%
Nazarene	2	0.39%
Pentecostal	15	2.53%
Rastafarian	6	0.97%
Roman Catholic	6	0.97%
Weslyan Holiness	53	8.77%
Other	13	2.14%
Don't know/Not stated	18	2.92%
Total	603	100.00%
NotApp :	6	

Country of birth
Q58. Country of birth	Counts	%
Antigua and Barbuda	513	84.17%
Other Caribbean countries	2	0.39%
Canada	2	0.39%
Dominica	12	1.93%
Dominican Republic	1	0.19%
Guyana	16	2.70%
Jamaica	20	3.28%
Monsterrat	1	0.19%
St. Lucia	2	0.39%
St. Vincent and the Grenadines	12	1.93%
Trinidad and Tobago	1	0.19%
United Kingdom	1	0.19%
USA	19	3.09%
USVI United States Virgin Islands	1	0.19%
Not Stated	5	0.77%
Total	609	100.00%

Country of Citizenship
Q71 Country of Citizenship 1	Counts	%
Antigua and Barbuda	557	91.51%
Dominica	2	0.39%
Dominican Republic	1	0.19%
Guyana	12	1.93%
Jamaica	16	2.70%
St. Lucia	1	0.19%
St. Vincent and the Grenadines	11	1.74%
Trinidad and Tobago	1	0.19%
United Kingdom	1	0.19%
USA	5	0.77%
Not Stated	1	0.19%
Total	609	100.00%

Country of Second Citizenship
Q71 Country of Citizenship 2	Counts	%
Other Caribbean countries	4	6.25%
Canada	2	4.17%
Dominica	9	16.67%
Guyana	8	14.58%
Jamaica	5	8.33%
Monsterrat	2	4.17%
St. Lucia	1	2.08%
St. Vincent and the Grenadines	2	4.17%
United Kingdom	1	2.08%
USA	21	37.50%
Total	56	100.00%
NotApp :	553	
