= Cyril James (politician) =

Antiguan politician

Cyril James MP

Member of the House of Representatives of Antigua and Barbuda
- In office 11 February 1971 – 31 January 1976
- Preceded by: Constituency established
- Constituency: St. Philip's South

Personal details
- Party: Progressive Labour Movement

Cyril James was an Antiguan Progressive Labour Movement politician, who was elected as Member of Parliament for St. Philip's South in the 1971 general election.
