= Montpelier–Brownes Bay–Gaynors =

Coordinates: 17°03′N 61°43′W

- Village
- Interactive map of the Montpelier–Brownes Bay–Gaynors main place
- Location within Antigua and Barbuda
- Country: Antigua and Barbuda
- Island: Antigua
- Parish: Saint Philip

Area
  - Total: 7.47 km^{2} (2.88 sq mi)
- Elevation: 76 m (249 ft)

Population (2011)
  - Total: 0
- Time zone: UTC-4 (AST)

Montpelier–Brownes Bay–Gaynors is a small village in Saint Philip Parish, Antigua and Barbuda. Important locations in the village include the Montpelier sugar estate, Gaynor's Estate, and Brown's Bay Estate.

== Demographics ==
Montpelier had a population of 8 in 2001, making it the smallest town in all of Antigua and Barbuda. In 2011, the village was uninhabited.
