= Jefferson's Estate =

Official historic site of Antigua and Barbuda

Jefferson's
- Location within Antigua and Barbuda
- 17°04′51.53″N 61°43′21.06″W
- Location: Saint Philip, Antigua and Barbuda

History
- Built: 1750

Historical Site of Antigua and Barbuda

Jefferson's, also known as Zion Hill, is an official historic site in Saint Philip, Antigua and Barbuda. It was a sugar plantation established in 1750. The sugar mill tower continues to stand. 176 people were enslaved here at the time of emancipation.
