= Lower Walronds =

Official historic site of Antigua and Barbuda

- Location within Antigua and Barbuda
- 17°02′48.63″N 61°43′42.37″W
- Location: Saint Philip, Antigua and Barbuda

History
- Built: 1701

Historical Site of Antigua and Barbuda

Lower Walronds is an official historic site in Saint Philip, Antigua and Barbuda. It was a sugar plantation established in 1701. The sugar mill tower no longer stands. 233 people were enslaved here and at Upper Walronds at the time of emancipation.
