= Wickham's Estate =

Official historic site of Antigua and Barbuda

Wickham's
- Location within Antigua and Barbuda
- 17°04′36.70″N 61°42′53.43″W
- Location: Saint Philip, Antigua and Barbuda

History
- Built: 1681

Historical Site of Antigua and Barbuda

Wickham's is an official historic site in Saint Philip, Antigua and Barbuda. It was a sugar plantation established in 1681. The sugar mill tower continues to stand. 150 people were enslaved here at the time of emancipation.
