= Rooms Estate =

Official historic site of Antigua and Barbuda

Rooms
- Location within Antigua and Barbuda
- 17°05′49.79″N 61°41′57.46″W
- Location: Saint Philip, Antigua and Barbuda

History
- Built: 1750

Historical Site of Antigua and Barbuda

Rooms is an official historic site in Saint Philip, Antigua and Barbuda. It was a sugar plantation established in 1750. The sugar mill tower continues to stand. 168 people were enslaved here at the time of emancipation.
