= Parson's Maul =

Official historic site of Antigua and Barbuda

- Location within Antigua and Barbuda
- 17°05′40.48″N 61°43′16.68″W
- Location: Saint Philip, Antigua and Barbuda

History
- Built: 1750

Historical Site of Antigua and Barbuda

Parson's Maul is an official historic site in Saint Philip, Antigua and Barbuda. It was a sugar plantation established in 1750. The sugar mill tower no longer stands. 24 people were enslaved here at the time of emancipation.
