= Crossroads Centre =

Substance abuse treatment facility in Antigua

Coordinates: 17.0390°N 61.7258°W

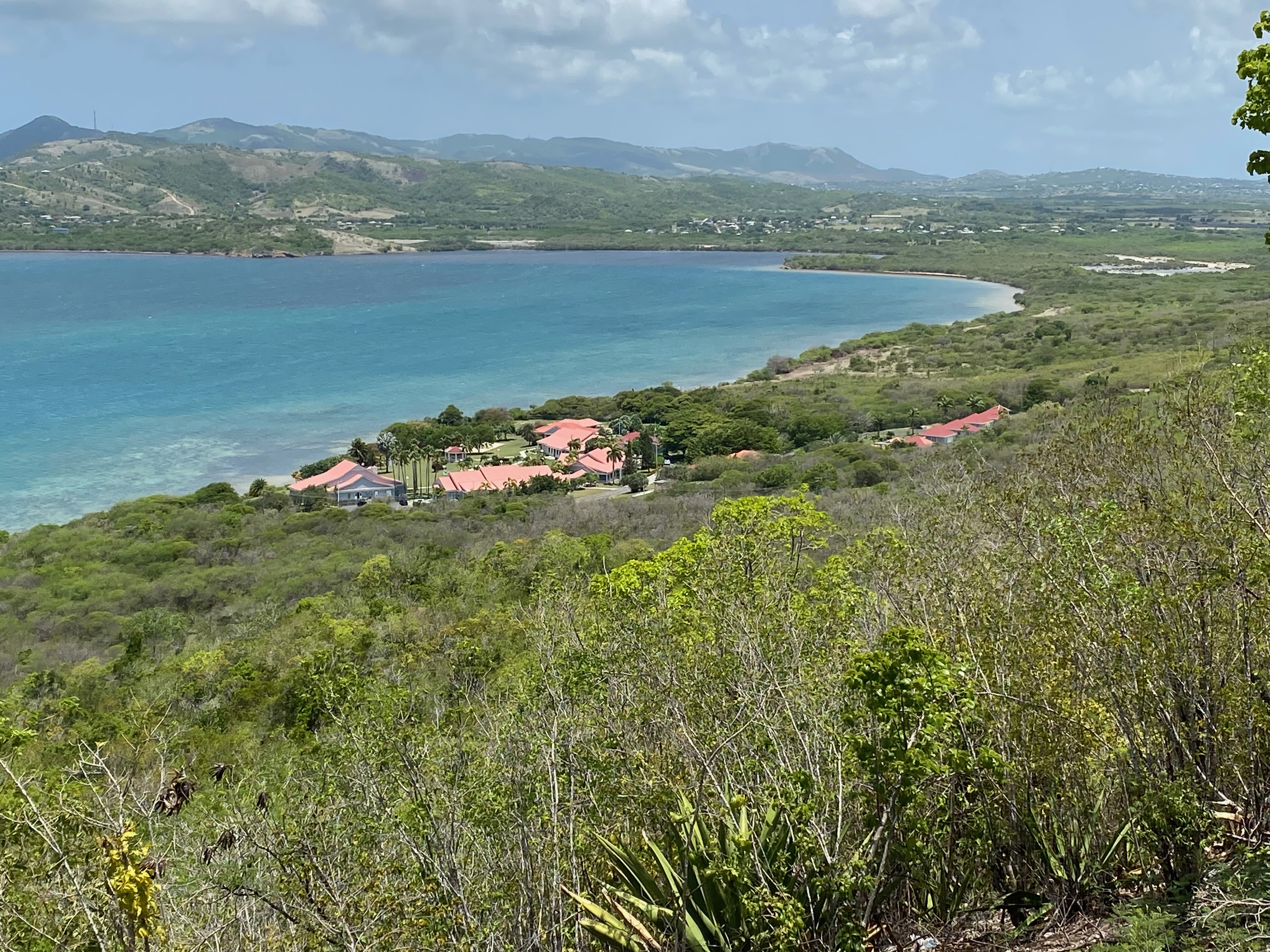

Geography
- Location: Collins, Saint Philip, Antigua and Barbuda

Organisation
- Patron: Eric Clapton; Richard Conte

Services
- Beds: 36

History
- Founded: 1998

The Crossroads Centre is a substance-abuse rehabilitation centre for drug and alcohol addiction located near St. Philip's, Antigua on the shores of Willoughby Bay.

It was founded with support from guitarist and singer Eric Clapton in 1998. He has been assisting with its funding by organising the annual Crossroads Guitar Festival since 1999.

== History ==
The centre was founded by guitarist Eric Clapton and Richard Conte, CEO of The Priory Hospitals Group (London), and Transitional Hospitals Corporation (Nevada). All development of the facility was performed by officers and employees of these two companies. Conte and Clapton served as the centre's first two board members, with Conte being chairman. Transitional put up all working capital during the development phase and the facility was initially owned two-thirds by Transitional and one-third by Clapton. Former prime minister Lester Bird of Antigua was integrally involved with Transitional and arranged for the government of Antigua's assistance with roads, utilities and a favourable land purchase price. Conte's wife is credited with naming the facility; his associate Lester Keizer of Transitional was the 'point man' on the project.

== Location and description ==
The Crossroads Centre is located in a remote part of Collins, Antigua, just to the south of St. Philip's town. It is a drug and alcohol treatment centre which has a 36-bed design. It opened in 1998. Crossroads have local offices across a few countries: Madrid (Spain), Stockholm, (Sweden), London (UK), Ottawa (Canada), New York (US), Lakeville (US).

== Treatment ==
Crossroads Centre is a structured residential program which follows a 12-step approach modeled after the Betty Ford Center and Alcoholics Anonymous. As of 2013 the facility has 36 beds.

== Caribbean clients ==
Crossroads is the only drug rehabilitation program on the island of 80,000 people. At a time when drug trafficking and addiction rates have been rising in the Caribbean, the facility will treat locals at low cost. Clapton's target is to have one-third of the beds reserved for permanent residents of the Caribbean islands. As of 2013 about 15 percent of the beds go to poor people from Antigua and Barbuda.

== Fundraising ==
Clapton personally organises the Crossroads Guitar Festival since 1999, with guests such as Albert Lee, B. B. King, Jeff Beck, Keith Richards, Keith Urban, Robbie Robertson and Robert Cray among many others. The 2013 two-day event at Madison Square Garden was the fifth such benefit concert. Also supported are two halfway houses for recovering addicts, on Antigua for local residents, and in Delray Beach, Florida, for others.
