= Mayer's Estate =

Official historic site of Antigua and Barbuda

Mayer's
- Location within Antigua and Barbuda
- 17°05′08.66″N 61°42′42.32″W
- Location: Saint Philip, Antigua and Barbuda

History
- Built: 1750

Historical Site of Antigua and Barbuda

Mayer's, also known as Benlomand, is an official historic site in Saint Philip, Antigua and Barbuda. It was a sugar plantation established in 1750. The sugar mill tower continues to stand. Between 1819 and 1829 about ninety people were enslaved here.
