= Sheriff's Estate =

Official historic site of Antigua and Barbuda

Sheriff's
- Location within Antigua and Barbuda
- 17°02′37.30″N 61°41′25.36″W
- Location: Saint Philip, Antigua and Barbuda

History
- Built: 17th century

Historical Site of Antigua and Barbuda

Sheriff's, also known as Exchange, is an official historic site in Saint Philip, Antigua and Barbuda. It was a sugar plantation established in the 17th century. The sugar mill tower continues to stand. In 1864 there were 44 acres of sugarcane cultivation and 31 cattle.
