= Wilmoth Daniel =

Antiguan politician

Wilmoth Daniel MP

Member of the House of Representatives of Antigua and Barbuda
- In office 8 March 1994 – 19 February 1999
- Preceded by: Reuben Henry Harris
- Succeeded by: Sherfield Bowen
- Constituency: St. Philip's South
- In office 23 March 2004 – 26 February 2018
- Preceded by: Sherfield Bowen
- Succeeded by: Lennox Weston
- Constituency: St. Philip's South

Deputy Prime Minister of Antigua and Barbuda
- In office 26 March 2004 – 12 June 2014
- Preceded by: Robin Yearwood
- Succeeded by: Vacant

Personal details
- Party: United Progressive Party

Wilmoth Daniel is an Antiguan United Progressive Party politician, who was elected as Member of Parliament for St. Philip's South in the 1994, 2004, 2009, and 2014 general elections.
