= The Retreat, Saint Philip =

Official historic site of Antigua and Barbuda

The Retreat
- Location within Antigua and Barbuda
- 17°05′05.33″N 61°44′06.06″W
- Location: Saint Philip, Antigua and Barbuda

History
- Built: 1750

Historical Site of Antigua and Barbuda

The Retreat, also known as Montgomery, is an official historic site in Saint Philip, Antigua and Barbuda. It was a sugar plantation established in 1750. The sugar mill tower no longer stands. 46 people were enslaved here at the time of emancipation.
