= Indian Town Point =

Location of Indian Town Point within Antigua and Barbuda

Indian Town Point is a prominent headland on the eastern coast of Antigua. It lies between the town of Willkie's and Nonsuch Bay at 17°6′N 61°40′W.
