= Lennox Weston =

Antiguan politician

Lennox Weston MP

Member of the House of Representatives of Antigua and Barbuda
- In office 21 March 2018 – 16 December 2022
- Preceded by: Willmoth Daniel
- Succeeded by: Sherfield Bowen
- Constituency: St. Philip's South

Leader of Government Business in the Senate of Antigua and Barbuda
- In office 24 June 2014 – 26 February 2018
- Succeeded by: Cheryl Mary Clare Hurst

Member of the Senate of Antigua and Barbuda
- In office 12 March 2009 – 26 February 2018; Government senator

Personal details
- Political party: Antigua and Barbuda Labour Party

Lennox Weston is an Antiguan Labour Party politician, who was elected as Member of Parliament for St. Philip's South in the general election held on 21 March 2018.
