= Harman's Estate =

Official historic site of Antigua and Barbuda

Harman's
- Location within Antigua and Barbuda
- 17°02′53.82″N 61°43′11.03″W
- Location: Saint Philip, Antigua and Barbuda

History
- Built: 1696

Historical Site of Antigua and Barbuda

Harman's is an official historic site in Saint Philip, Antigua and Barbuda. It was a sugar plantation established in 1696. The sugar mill tower continues to stand and was likely renovated after the 1843 earthquake. 146 people were enslaved here at the time of emancipation.
