= Gaynor's Estate =

Official historic site of Antigua and Barbuda

Gaynor's
- Location within Antigua and Barbuda
- 17°4′6.3″N 61°43′8.2″W
- Location: Saint Philip, Antigua and Barbuda

History
- Built: 1700s

National Cultural Heritage of Antigua and Barbuda

Gaynor's is an official historic site and former sugar plantation in Saint Philip, Antigua and Barbuda. The site is composed of a mill, overtaken by bush as of a 2015 expedition, and a two-storey concrete block structure. There was also once a large plantation house, with a front gallery, open lawn, and other typical features. The site was built in the 1700s, and has been crown land since 1958.
