= Mill Reef Club =

Reef in Antigua

Coordinates: 17.033333°N 61.683333°W

The Mill Reef Club is a 1,500-acre members-only club that includes five miles of shoreline and three islands in Mill Reef–Half Moon Bay on the east coast of Antigua.

The Club was founded in 1947 by Connecticut architect Robertson 'Happy' Ward (1897–1988), with initial capital of $38,000. There were 45 founding members, each paying $7,500 for a plot for building a home. A clubhouse was constructed in 1949, and a 9-hole golf course in 1952. Today, there are 53 homes. The clubhouse and beach cottages can accommodate 100 guests. In 2013 the Club established the Mill Reef Yacht Club, which hosts international sailing regattas on Nonsuch Bay, Antigua.

Early Club members included Archibald MacLeish, Dean Acheson and Paul Mellon, who later named his champion horse Mill Reef for the club. Early Club rules reflected a British style that required coats and ties at dinner and whites on the tennis and croquet courts. Ostentatious displays of wealth were discouraged by a $25,000 limit on home construction costs and a 2-bedroom limit to houses (no longer in force). Membership was by invitation only, either through existing members or by Ward encouraging travel agents to pass on the details of high-end clients who would contribute to his vision of "a Caribbean community of blue waters, white beaches and sweeping vistas dedicated to good fellowship."

The Antiguan government welcomed its wealthy, publicity-shy guests, and when paparazzi attempted to photograph Jacqueline Kennedy from an adjacent public beach, they were arrested and deported.

The Club and its residents were criticized in A Small Place, a 1988 book by Jamaica Kincaid, which noted that ordinary Antiguans stood no chance of entry to the Club or accessing the beautiful beaches unless as staff.

Since 1960 The Mill Reef Fund has distributed over US $15 million to worthy organizations in Antigua and Barbuda. The 501(c)(3) Public Charity reported total revenue of $690,290 in 2023 and total assets of $720,313.
