= Lyon's Estate =

Official historic site of Antigua and Barbuda

Lyon's
- Location within Antigua and Barbuda
- 17°03′26.95″N 61°43′55.74″W
- Location: Saint Philip, Antigua and Barbuda

History
- Built: 1698

Historical Site of Antigua and Barbuda

Lyon's is an official historic site in Saint Philip, Antigua and Barbuda. It was a sugar plantation established in 1698. The sugar mill tower no longer stands. 274 people were enslaved here at the time of emancipation.
