= Watson's Estate =

Official historic site of Antigua and Barbuda

Watson's
- Location within Antigua and Barbuda
- 17°03′03.4″N 61°40′43.2″W
- Location: Saint Philip, Antigua and Barbuda

History
- Built: 1740s

Historical Site of Antigua and Barbuda

Watson's is an official historic site in Saint Philip, Antigua and Barbuda. It was a sugar plantation established in the 1740s. The sugar mill tower continues to stand. 40 people were enslaved here at the time of emancipation.
