= Lavington's Estate =

Official historic site of Antigua and Barbuda

Lavington's
- Location within Antigua and Barbuda
- 17°03′28.95″N 61°44′21.70″W
- Location: Saint Philip, Antigua and Barbuda

History
- Built: 1739

Historical Site of Antigua and Barbuda

Lavington's is an official historic site in Saint Philip, Antigua and Barbuda. It was a sugar plantation established in 1739. The sugar mill tower no longer stands. 150 people were enslaved here in 1829.
