= Upper Gambles =

Neighbourhood in Saint John Parish, Antigua

Coordinates: 17°7′45.86″N 61°50′0.97″W

- Village
- Location within Antigua and Barbuda
- Country: Antigua and Barbuda
- Island: Antigua
- Civil parish: Saint John Parish

Population (2011)
  - Total: 366
- Time zone: UTC-4 (AST)

Upper Gamble's is a village in Saint John, Antigua and Barbuda.

== Demographics ==
Upper Gamble's has one enumeration district, ED 16500.

=== Census data (2011) ===
Q48 Ethnic	Counts	%
African descendent	292	79.83%
Caucasian/White	2	0.58%
East Indian/India	12	3.17%
Mixed (Black/White)	33	8.93%
Mixed (Other)	1	0.29%
Hispanic	4	1.15%
Syrian/Lebanese	12	3.17%
Other	11	2.88%
Total	366	100.00%

Q49 Religion	Counts	%
Adventist	16	4.32%
Anglican	81	22.19%
Baptist	25	6.92%
Church of God	8	2.31%
Jehovah Witness	7	2.02%
Methodist	36	9.80%
Moravian	36	9.80%
Nazarene	4	1.15%
None/no religion	7	2.02%
Pentecostal	40	10.95%
Rastafarian	1	0.29%
Roman Catholic	58	15.85%
Weslyan Holiness	2	0.58%
Other	33	8.93%
Don't know/Not stated	11	2.88%
Total	366	100.00%

Q58. Country of birth	Counts	%
Africa	6	1.73%
Other Latin or North American countries	4	1.15%
Antigua and Barbuda	223	61.10%
Other Caribbean countries	6	1.73%
Other Asian countries	16	4.32%
Other European countries	1	0.29%
Dominica	9	2.59%
Dominican Republic	2	0.58%
Guyana	26	7.20%
Jamaica	19	5.19%
Monsterrat	4	1.15%
St. Kitts and Nevis	6	1.73%
St. Lucia	5	1.44%
St. Vincent and the Grenadines	3	0.86%
Syria	9	2.59%
Trinidad and Tobago	4	1.15%
United Kingdom	1	0.29%
USA	14	3.75%
USVI United States Virgin Islands	1	0.29%
Not Stated	3	0.86%
Total	366	100.00%

Q55 Internet Use	Counts	%
Yes	184	50.43%
No	151	41.21%
Don't know/Not stated	31	8.36%
Total	366	100.00%

Q71 Country of Citizenship 1	Counts	%
Antigua and Barbuda	255	69.74%
Other Caribbean countries	5	1.44%
Other Asian and Middle Eastern countries	24	6.63%
Dominica	5	1.44%
Dominican Republic	1	0.29%
Guyana	25	6.92%
Jamaica	17	4.61%
Monsterrat	2	0.58%
St. Lucia	6	1.73%
St. Vincent and the Grenadines	2	0.58%
Trinidad and Tobago	1	0.29%
United Kingdom	1	0.29%
USA	9	2.59%
Other countries	9	2.59%
Not Stated	1	0.29%
Total	366	100.00%

Q71 Country of Citizenship 2 (Country of Second Citizenship)	Counts	%
Other Caribbean countries	7	13.73%
Canada	6	11.76%
Other Asian and Middle Eastern countries	2	3.92%
Dominica	6	11.76%
Guyana	1	1.96%
Jamaica	2	3.92%
Monsterrat	1	1.96%
St. Vincent and the Grenadines	1	1.96%
Trinidad and Tobago	4	7.84%
United Kingdom	1	1.96%
USA	18	33.33%
Other countries	3	5.88%
Total	54	100.00%
NotApp :	312	

Employment status	Counts	%
Employed	182	60.92%
Unemployed	14	4.58%
Inactive	102	34.15%
Not stated	1	0.35%
Total	299	100.00%
NotApp :	66	

Q77 Training	Counts	%
Yes	4	1.41%
No	275	91.90%
Don't know/Not stated	20	6.69%
Total	299	100.00%
NotApp :	66	
