= Christian Hill =

Coordinates: 17°1′58″N 61°44′50″W

- Village
- Christian Hill in July 2024
- Interactive map of the Christian Hill main place
- Country: Antigua and Barbuda
- Parish: Saint Paul

Population (2011)
  - Total: 171

Christian Hill is a village in Saint Paul, Antigua and Barbuda. It had a population of 171 people in 2011.

== Geography ==
According to the Antigua and Barbuda Statistics Division, the village had a total area of 1.9 square kilometres in 2011.

== Demographics ==
There were 171 people living in Christian Hill as of the 2011 census. The village was 84.47% African, 11.80% white, 1.24% East Indian, 1.24% mixed black/white, and 1.24% other mixed. The population was born in different countries, including 74.53% in Antigua and Barbuda, 9.94% in the United Kingdom, 3.11% in "other European countries", and 3.11% in Saint Lucia. The population had diverse religious affiliations, including 22.98% Methodist, 19.88% Anglican, 14.29% Adventist, and 13.66% Pentecostal.
