= Nonsuch Bay, Antigua and Barbuda =

Coordinates: 17°03′N 61°42′W

Location of Nonsuch Bay within Antigua and Barbuda

Nonsuch Bay is the northern of two large indentations in the eastern coast of Antigua. It lies to the north of the other indentation, Willoughby Bay. Nonsuch Bay lies immediately to the south of Indian Town Point. Green Island lies close to the mouth of the bay.
