= Long Lane–Collins =

Coordinates: 17°05′N 61°44′W

- Village
- A farm in the village, 2021
- Interactive map of the Long Lane–Collins main place
- Location within Antigua and Barbuda
- Country: Antigua and Barbuda
- Island: Antigua
- Parish: Saint Philip

Population (2011)
  - Total: 118
- Time zone: UTC-4 (AST)

Long Lane–Collins is a village in Saint Philip, Antigua and Barbuda.

== Demographics ==
Long Lane–Collins has one enumeration district, ED 61500 (Long Lane_Collins).

Long Lane–Collins had a population of 118 in 2011.

=== Census data (2011) ===
Q48 Ethnic	Counts	%
African descendent	101	86.00%
Caucasian/White	5	4.00%
East Indian/India	1	1.00%
Mixed (Black/White)	5	4.00%
Mixed (Other)	6	5.00%
Total	118	100.00%

Q49 Religion	Counts	%
Adventist	14	12.00%
Anglican	28	24.00%
Baptist	4	3.00%
Church of God	2	2.00%
Methodist	14	12.00%
Moravian	9	8.00%
Nazarene	2	2.00%
None/no religion	1	1.00%
Pentecostal	9	8.00%
Rastafarian	1	1.00%
Roman Catholic	11	9.00%
Weslyan Holiness	4	3.00%
Other	1	1.00%
Don't know/Not stated	16	14.00%
Total	118	100.00%

Q58. Country of birth	Counts	%
Antigua and Barbuda	80	68.00%
Canada	6	5.00%
Dominica	4	3.00%
Guyana	2	2.00%
Jamaica	5	4.00%
St. Kitts and Nevis	1	1.00%
United Kingdom	5	4.00%
USA	11	9.00%
Not Stated	5	4.00%
Total	118	100.00%

Q71 Country of Citizenship 1	Counts	%
Antigua and Barbuda	111	94.00%
Other Caribbean countries	1	1.00%
Canada	1	1.00%
Guyana	2	2.00%
USA	1	1.00%
Not Stated	1	1.00%
Total	118	100.00%

Q71 Country of Citizenship 2 (Country of Second Citizenship)	Counts	%
Canada	5	16.00%
Dominica	4	12.00%
Jamaica	4	12.00%
United Kingdom	5	16.00%
USA	13	44.00%
Total	29	100.00%
NotApp :	88	

Q91 Business Earning (Earnings a business made)	Counts	%
$5,000 EC and over per month	2	100.00%
Total	2	100.00%
NotApp :	113	
Missing :	2	

Q117 MoneyOverseas (Money from friends and relatives overseas)	Counts	%
Under 100 EC$	92	100.00%
Total	92	100.00%
NotApp :	26	

Q55 Internet Use	Counts	%
Yes	83	71.00%
No	29	25.00%
Don't know/Not stated	5	4.00%
Total	118	100.00%

Employment status	Counts	%
Employed	54	58.97%
Unemployed	5	5.13%
Inactive	33	35.90%
Total	92	100.00%
NotApp :	26	
