= Bethesda, Antigua and Barbuda =

Bethesda
- Village
- Bethesda in August 2026
- Interactive map of the Bethesda main place
- Location within Antigua
- Coordinates: 17°03′N 61°45′W
- Country: Antigua and Barbuda
- Island: Antigua
- Civil parish: Saint Paul

Area
  - Total: 1.62 km^{2} (0.63 sq mi)
- Elevation: 12 m (39 ft)

Population (2011)
  - Total: 499
  - Density: 308/km^{2} (800/sq mi)
- Time zone: UTC-4 (AST)

Bethesda is a village in Saint Paul Parish on the island of Antigua, in Antigua and Barbuda.

It is located in the southeastern area of the island, to the northeast of English Harbour, at the head of Willoughby Bay.

== Geography ==
Bethesda is found on Willoughby Bay, which is a wide bay on the east coast of the island's southern peninsula. The terrain flattens out and extends inland to the northeast, eventually reaching the Central Plain, which is the island's core plain. The hills of Monks Hill may be found to the southwest, and they border both Falmouth Bay and English Harbour. The region is primarily agricultural and has a low population density.

The settlement, which has a population of exactly 499 people in 2011, may be found along the route that leads from St. Phillip's Parish in the southeastern part of Antigua to English Harbour.

The Bethesda Dam is located in the interior and is the second largest dam in the country, behind the Potworks Dam, which is located around 2 kilometers to the north. One of the largest remaining mangrove stands on the island is located at the Christian Cove wetland, which is located on the shore.

== History ==
The Methodists, who first arrived in Antigua in 1760 and began spreading their religion throughout the island, established a school for the employees of the Blake estate in 1812. It was the very first school in the West Indies to be constructed specifically for enslaved people. The pastoral care center saw an increase in patients following the abolition of slavery in 1834, which led to the establishment of a new location. In the beginning, the congregation and chapel were situated in Bridgetown, which is located on Willoughby Bay. In the year 1841, the mission relocated to Bethesda, which gets its name from the new church in recognition of the Bethesda Garden. Willoughby Bay was a hamlet in Antigua that was abandoned in 1843 after an earthquake. The people who lived there migrated to Freetown, which was at the time the most prominent freed-village on the island of Antigua. Some of them also moved to Bethesda. Even as early as 1847, the church underwent expansion, and in 1871, a new church that also included a school was constructed. The Methodists ran the classes until 1962, when a state school was founded. The current church building, which is a sturdy structure "dedicated to the glory of God," was constructed in 1975.

In addition, Bethesda was a significant player in the development of the early labor movement throughout history. In this location in January of 1951, the workers of the sugar cane industry engaged in a labor dispute with a major landowner named Alexander Moody-Stuart over their wages. Vere Cornwall Bird, who had previously served as the first prime minister of the independent state of Antigua and Barbuda, delivered the speech from which the winged term "to eat mussels and Widdy-Widdy and drink pond water" originates. In the event that there was nothing to eat as a result of the strike, we would sip pond water. At the time of the slaves, there was often excess bread lying around the Bethesda area, and anyone could take it. It has been exactly one year since the workers went on strike and successfully pushed for greater wages. In the shade of the unassuming tamarind tree, which still stands today but is significant in the annals of the nation's history, the terms were initially developed.

Nowadays, the location is home to a medical facility, an elementary school, and congregations of the Methodist Church in the Caribbean and Americas, the Church of God Antigua (Bethesda Zion Church, which was established in 1951), and the St. John's Pentecostal Church (1950s).

== Enumeration districts ==
- 71400 Bethesda-East
- 71500 Bethesda-West

Bethesda-East has a population of 291, and is 97.45% Afro-Antiguan, and 0.89 square kilometres. Bethesda-East shares boundaries with Saint Philip Parish. Bethesda-West has a population of 208, and is 94.90% Afro-Antiguan, and 0.73 square kilometres.

== Demographics ==
=== Census data (2011) ===
Q48 Ethnic	Counts	%
African descendent	481	96.38%
East Indian/India	3	0.64%
Mixed (Black/White)	1	0.21%
Mixed (Other)	10	1.91%
Don't know/Not stated	4	0.85%
Total	499	100.00%

Q49 Religion	Counts	%
Adventist	75	15.24%
Anglican	48	9.66%
Church of God	36	7.30%
Evangelical	11	2.15%
Jehovah Witness	2	0.43%
Methodist	161	32.62%
Moravian	6	1.29%
None/no religion	5	1.07%
Pentecostal	125	25.32%
Rastafarian	7	1.50%
Roman Catholic	4	0.86%
Wesleyan Holiness	4	0.86%
Other	1	0.21%
Don't know/Not stated	7	1.50%
Total	494	100.00%
NotApp :	4	

Q53 Insurance	Counts	%
Yes	293	58.72%
No	187	37.45%
Don't know/Not stated	19	3.83%
Total	499	100.00%

Q55 Internet Use	Counts	%
Yes	239	47.87%
No	244	48.94%
Don't know/Not stated	16	3.19%
Total	499	100.00%

Q58. Country of birth	Counts	%
Other Latin or North American countries	1	0.21%
Antigua and Barbuda	432	86.60%
Other Caribbean countries	1	0.21%
Canada	2	0.43%
Dominica	3	0.64%
Guyana	20	4.04%
Jamaica	4	0.85%
Monsterrat	2	0.43%
St. Kitts and Nevis	2	0.43%
St. Lucia	2	0.43%
St. Vincent and the Grenadines	1	0.21%
Trinidad and Tobago	2	0.43%
USA	17	3.40%
USVI United States Virgin Islands	4	0.85%
Not Stated	4	0.85%
Total	499	100.00%

Q71 Country of Citizenship 1	Counts	%
Antigua and Barbuda	471	94.47%
Other Caribbean countries	1	0.21%
Dominica	1	0.21%
Guyana	13	2.55%
Jamaica	2	0.43%
Monsterrat	1	0.21%
St. Lucia	1	0.21%
Trinidad and Tobago	2	0.43%
USA	1	0.21%
Other countries	1	0.21%
Not Stated	4	0.85%
Total	499	100.00%

Q71 Country of Citizenship 2 (Country of Second Citizenship)	Counts	%
Other Caribbean countries	3	7.89%
Canada	3	7.89%
Dominica	2	5.26%
Guyana	7	18.42%
Jamaica	2	5.26%
Monsterrat	1	2.63%
St. Lucia	1	2.63%
St. Vincent and the Grenadines	1	2.63%
USA	19	47.37%
Total	40	100.00%
NotApp :	458	

Employment status	Counts	%
Employed	244	63.01%
Unemployed	23	6.03%
Inactive	117	30.14%
Not stated	3	0.82%
Total	387	100.00%
NotApp :	111	

Q117 MoneyOverseas	Counts	%
Under 100 EC$	378	97.53%
500 to 999 EC$	1	0.27%
1,000 to 1,999 EC$	5	1.37%
2,000 to 4,999 EC$	2	0.55%
5,000 to 99,999 EC$	1	0.27%
Total	387	100.00%
NotApp :	111	
