= Saint Philip, Antigua and Barbuda =

Coordinates: 17°05′N 61°42′W

Parish of Saint Philip
- Parish
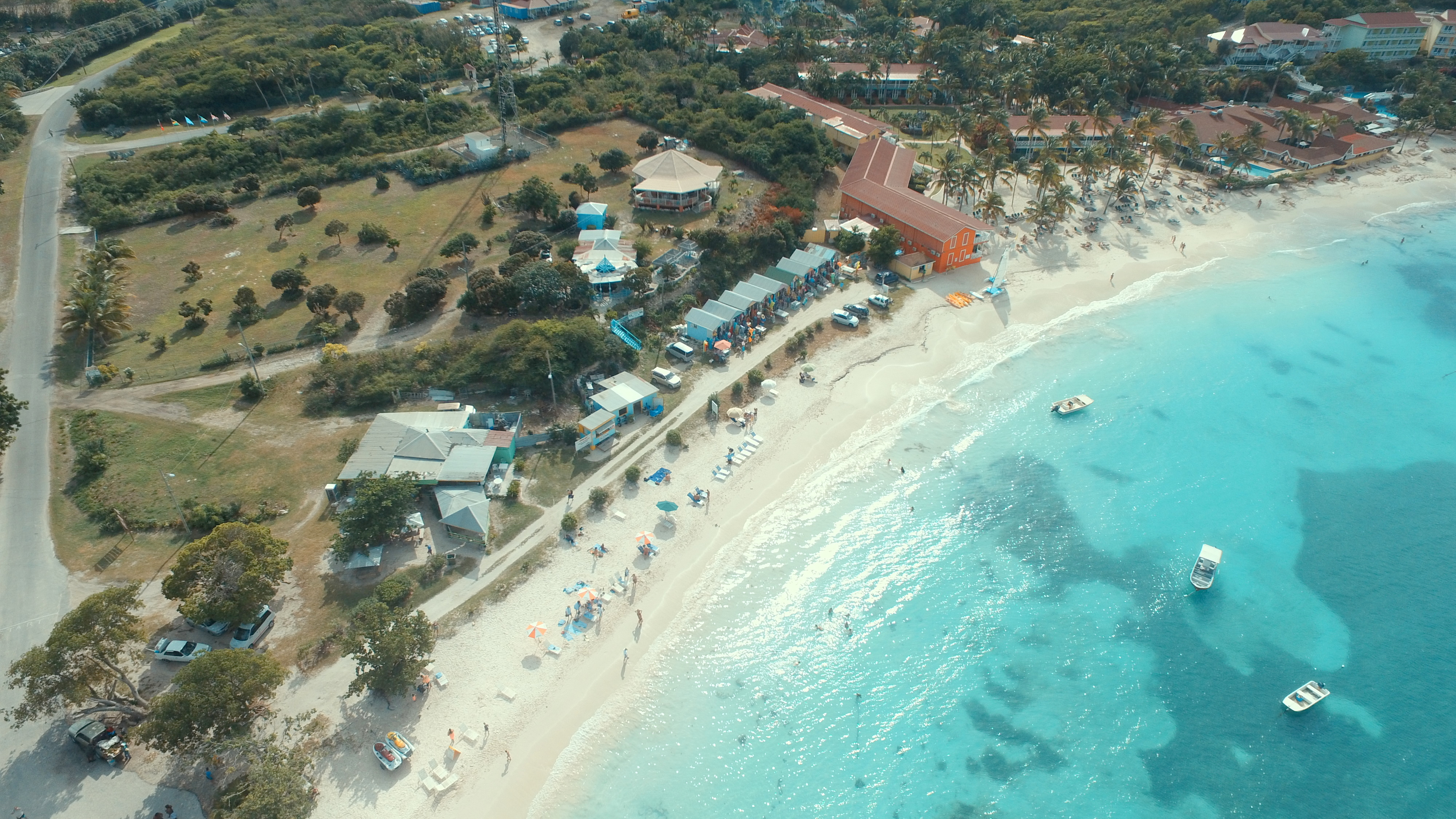
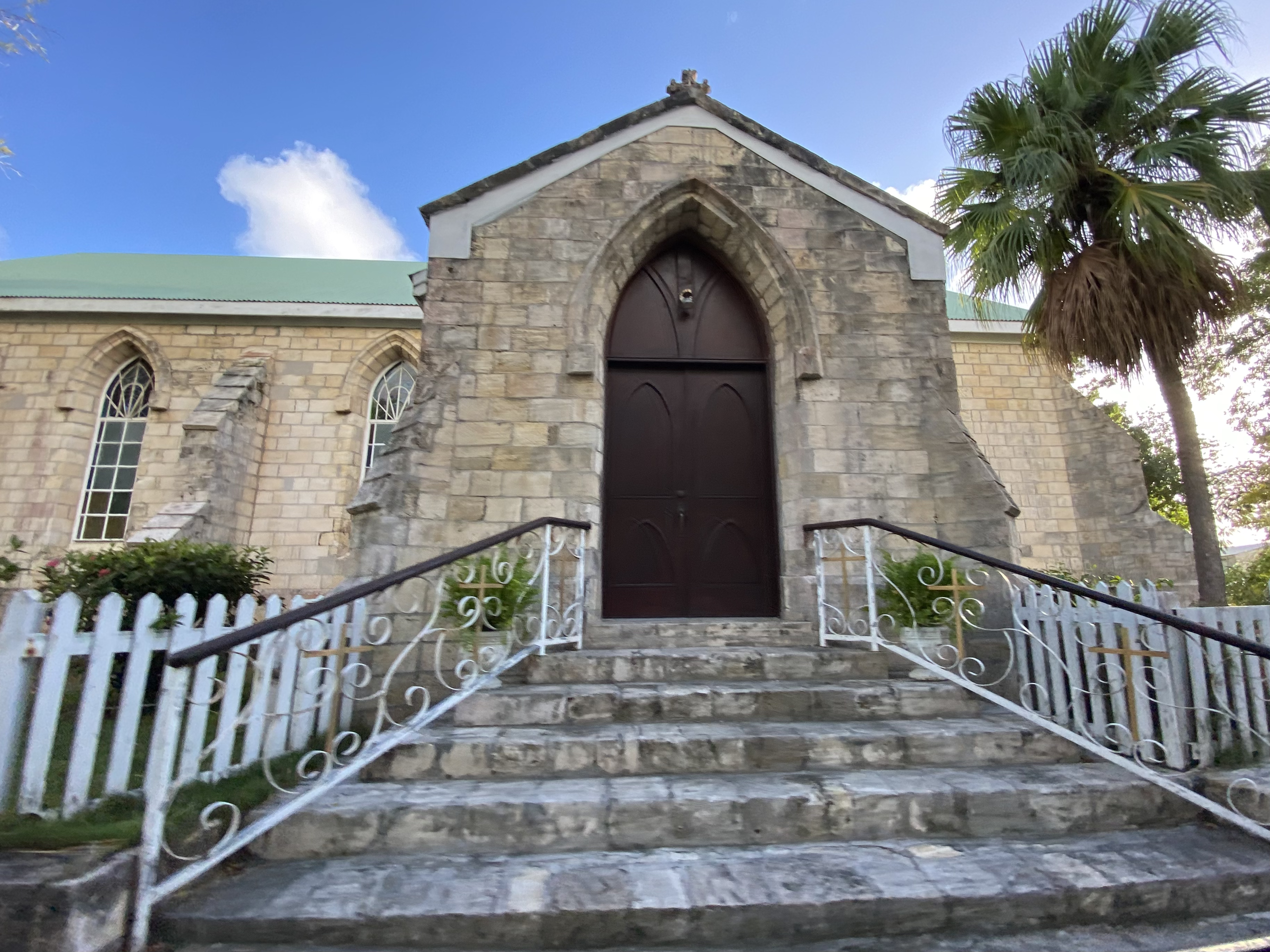
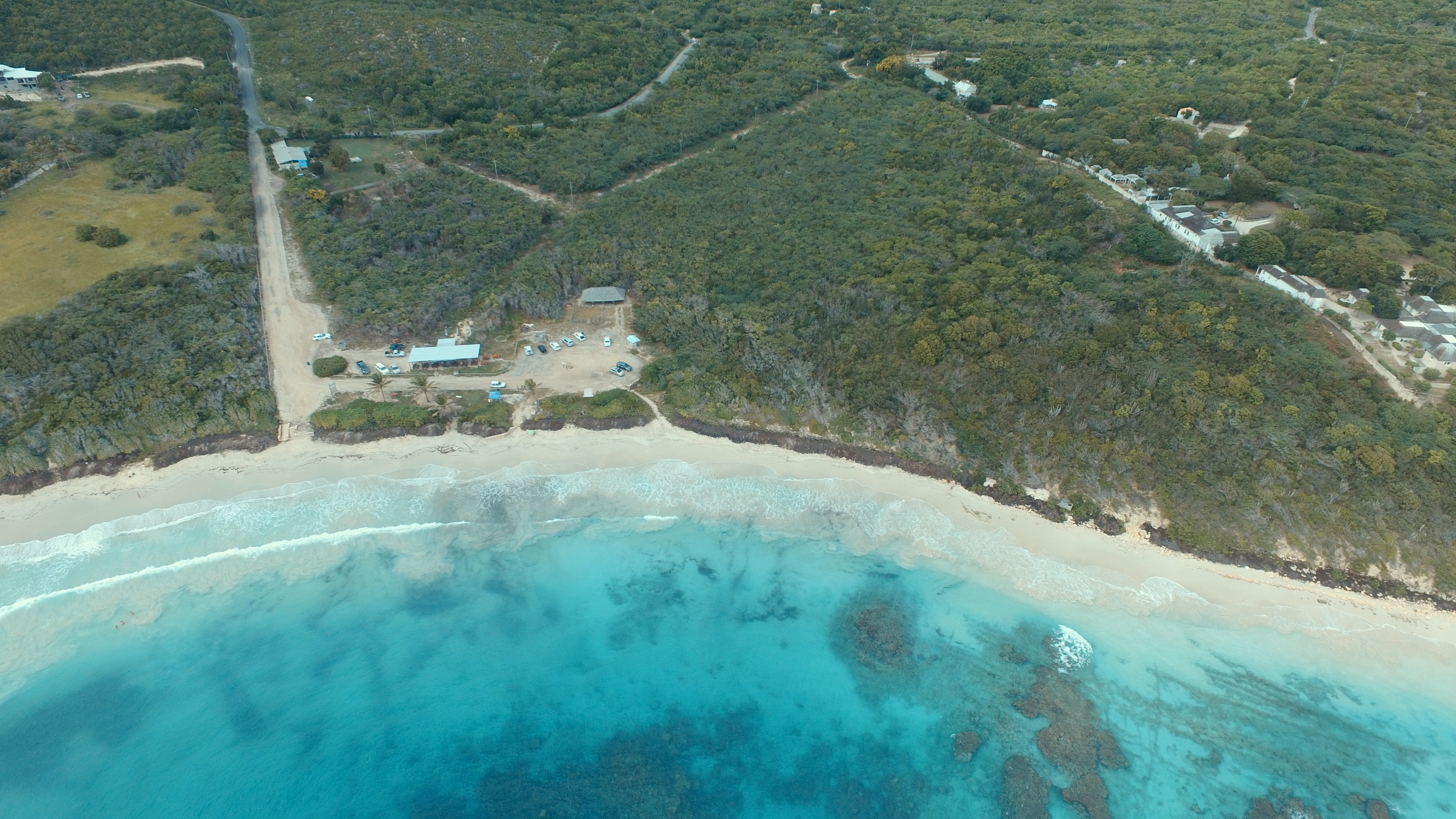
- (from top: left to right) Long Bay Beach, St. Phillip's Anglican Church, a farm, Half Moon Bay

- Country: Antigua and Barbuda
- Established: 24 August 1681; 345 years ago (old style); 3 September 1681; 345 years ago (new style)
- Capital: St. Philip's
- Largest city: Willikies

Government
  - MPs: Randy Baltimore, Kiz Johnson

Population
  - 2018 estimate: 3,689
  - Density: 82.3/km^{2} (213.2/sq mi)
- HDI (2023): ▲0.839 very high · 6th
- Time zone: UTC-4 (AST)

Saint Philip (Antiguan and Barbudan Creole: Sen Filip), officially the Parish of Saint Philip, is a civil parish of Antigua and Barbuda, on the easternmost portion of Antigua island. Its capital is the village of St. Philip's. Saint Philip borders Saint Peter and Saint Paul. Saint Philip faces the Atlantic Ocean. Saint Philip is surrounded by various islands and islets. It had an estimated population of 3,689 in 2018, which makes it the least populous parish of Antigua and Barbuda.

Saint Philip has a relatively low population density and is the parish with the most significant Atlantic coastline. Due to its location, it is the coldest parish in the country with temperatures regularly falling to fifteen degrees Celsius during the winter. Saint Philip is separated into two peninsulas; the densely populated northern peninsula where the majority of the population lives and the sparsely populated southern peninsula with higher elevations and more vegetation cover.

The economy is mostly dominated by tourism, with incomes below the national average and relatively high rates of poverty. Saint Philip was historically noted for its muscovado sugar production, with many former sugar mills such as those in Montpelier and Brown's Bay being official historic sites. Beach tourism is popular in the southern peninsula, although rough and steep coasts limit this tourism to a small area.

It is among the least diverse regions of the country, with a largely homogenous African population and a quarter of the population being immigrants. The largest settlement in the parish is Willikies with about a third of the population. The population is mostly Protestant, with significant numbers of Anglicans and Seventh-day Adventists. Settlements like Bridgetown and Freetown used to be among the largest on the island, although the parish now has few major settlements.

The parish was created in August 1681, when Antigua was divided into five parishes. Saint Philip and the four other parishes were permanently established in July 1692, and confirmed in January 1693. The primary objective of the establishment of parishes was providing for the parish church. A large portion of the parish's lands were used for agricultural purposes. Numerous historical relics from the parish can still be seen today, including the Archbold's and Elme's Creek plantations.

== History ==
Saint Philip was created in August 1681, when Antigua was divided into five parishes. Saint Philip and the four other parishes were permanently established in July 1692, and confirmed in January 1693. The primary objective of the establishment of parishes was providing for the parish church. Like most other parishes on Antigua, in its early colonial history, it was often dominated by the sugar industry, with some regions having smaller industries of cavalier rum, cattle, and muscovado sugar. Saint Philip had over 36 sugar mills during the sugarcane era. The main church of this parish was today's church in the village of St. Philip's.

Historically, the region was divided into the Belfast Division in the north and the Nonsuch Division in the south. These two and the eastern parts of the Willoughby Bay Division were also administratively confirmed in 1873 as the Parish Boundaries Act.

The region is mostly farmland, partly wilderness. After the abolition of slavery in 1834, Freetown was a freedman's settlement, at one time the largest freedman's village on the island. Around 1856, shortly after the abolition of slavery, the parish included the estates Rooms, Parson Maule, Collins, Glanvilles, Grants, Sion Hill, Mayers, Retreat, Comfort Hall, Grays, Wickhams, Elliotts, Long Lane, Gaynors, Elmes, Gobles, Lower Walronds, Lyons, Lavingtons, Ffrys, Montpellier, Archbolds and Browns, Skerretts, Colebrooks, Upper Walronds, Harmans, Jefferson's, Mannings, Hope, Watsons, Lynches, Sheriffs and Mangrove– some of these farms still exist today, while others evolved into The Rectory (today St. Philip's), Farrs Hill Village (Freetown), Seatons, Newfield, Willoghby Bay, Wilkies, Mayers, Salters, McCay Lands, Sandy Ground, Brooks Land and Grays Hill– some were abandoned after the great earthquake in 1843.

In the 20th century, several luxury hotels and high-end residential resorts were built on the coasts, but they are largely isolated, especially in the southern part (Half Moon Bay, Mill Reef Club, Brown's Bay Resort, Crossroads Centre) and made little contribution to economic development. The population decreased by 3.3% between 2001 and 2011, a typical rural exodus phenomenon, while the state as a whole increased by more than 11%.

== Geography ==
Saint Phillip is located within the Leeward Islands xeric scrub, and is separated into two peninsulas by Nonsuch Bay and Ayers Creek. Most of the parish is undeveloped, with most of the villages being located on the northern peninsula. There are also small pockets of settlement on the coast, mostly luxury developments, as well as tiny isolated villages in the south. Saint Philip is located outside of the Central Plain, and thus is at a higher elevation than much of the rest of the island. Saint Philip has a coastline dotted with islands, coral reefs, and small bays and inlets. The northern peninsula is flatter than the southern peninsula and is more suitable for human settlement.

== Demographics ==
=== Ethnicity and immigration ===
In the 2011 census, Saint Philip had a population of 3,322. Of these, 91.15% were of African descent. Other ethnic groups included 1.35% white, 0.35% East Indian/Indian, 0.50% mixed Black/White, 2.02% other mixed, 1.17% Hispanic, 0.07% Syrian/Lebanese, and 0.74% classified under other ethnicities. Additionally, 2.65% did not disclose their ethnicity.

Regarding place of birth, 76.46% were born in Antigua and Barbuda. The largest minority group, 4.42%, was born in the United States, followed by 3.50% from Guyana, 3.08% from Jamaica, 2.55% from Dominica, 1.06% from the Dominican Republic, 0.60% from the United Kingdom, and 0.53% from St. Vincent and the Grenadines. Smaller percentages were from other Caribbean, European, and Asian countries, as well as Canada and Africa. Finally, 4.39% did not state their place of birth.

Among individuals born outside Antigua and Barbuda, the breakdown by ethnicity was as follows: 78.64% were of African descent, 6.81% were white, 0.92% were Indian, 1.66% were mixed Black/White, 3.13% were of other mixed ethnicity, 5.16% were Hispanic, 0.18% were Syrian/Lebanese, 2.39% were from other ethnic groups, and 1.10% either didn't know or didn't state their ethnicity.

=== Religion ===
Out of the 3,288 individuals surveyed, the breakdown of religious affiliations is as follows: Adventist (17.60%), Anglican (27.18%), Baptist (2.04%), Church of God (2.29%), Evangelical (0.25%), Jehovah's Witness (2.11%), Methodist (11.70%), Moravian (3.68%), Nazarene (0.43%), Irreligious (3.65%), Pentecostal (3.93%), Rastafarian (0.54%), Roman Catholic (5.36%), Wesleyan Holiness (11.02%), Other faiths (2.36%), No affiliation stated (5.87%).

== Politics and government ==
=== Politics ===
Saint Philip was split into two seats for the general election in 2023 in Antigua: St. Philip's North, which included primarily the northern peninsula of the parish, and St. Philip's South, which included both the southern peninsula of the parish and parts of Saint Paul. In 2023, the Labour Party received 708 votes, compared to the UPP candidate's 615, to win the St. Philip's North constituency. 1,346 out of the 1,876 registered voters cast ballots, or 71.75% of the total. Seaton's, Glanvilles, and the area of Carty's Hill made up St. Philip's North's polling district "A." There were 301 voters in station 1 and 338 voters in station 2. The United Progressive Party narrowly prevailed in polling district "A". Willikies and Long Bay made up polling district "B", together with the minor settlements of Pineapple Beach, Comfort Hall, Rooms, Sign, and Mayers. All three polling stations in polling district "B" were narrowly won by the Labour Party. Polling district "C" was made up primarily of Newfield, as well as Collins Estate. There was one polling station with 268 voters, with the Labour Party winning the district in a landslide.

There were 1,258 electors in St. Philip's South, 582 voted for the UPP and 360 for the ABLP. Polling district "A" of St. Philip's South comprised the entirety of Freetown village, with additional electors from the surrounding neighbourhoods of Browne's Bay and Mill Reef. Station 1 of polling district "A" had 272 electors and station 2 had 243 electors. Polling district "A" was won by the UPP. Polling district "B" of St. Philip's South had only 115 electors and one polling station. Polling district "B" was composed of St. Philip's village and Montpelier, however almost all electors were from St. Philip's village. Polling district "B" was won by the UPP. The vast majority of electors in polling district "C" of St. Philip's South were from the portions of the constituency in Saint Paul.

=== Police services ===
There are two police stations in the parish, Willikies Police Station, serving the northern areas of Saint Philip and portions of Saint Peter, and the Freetown Police Station serving the southern areas of the parish. Both police stations are part of geographical division "B".

== Economy ==
=== Business ownership ===
Out of the 78 owners of businesses in Saint Philip, 9.09% said they made less than $1,000 in EC per month from their business, 18.18% said they made $1,000 to $1,999 in EC per month from their business, 28.79% said they made $2,000 to $2,999 in EC per month from their business, 7.58% said they made $3,000 to $4,999 in EC per month from their business, and 36.36% said they made $5,000 or more in EC per month from their business. While 60.00% of white company owners, 50.00% of Hispanic business owners, 100.00% of Syrian/Lebanese business owners, and 100.00% of other business owners made more than EC$5,000 each month from their companies, only 32.73% of business owners of African descent did.

=== Employment ===
In 2011, 57.34% had a job and worked, 0.82% had a job but did not work, 1.37% were looking for their first job, 4.16% were looking for work that was not their first, 1.05% did not seek but wanted to work and were available, 10.33% attended school, 4.39% had home duties, 12.94% retired and did not work, 1.46% were disabled, 1.01% "other," and 5.12% didn't know or didn't state their job status. 85.70% of workers had a regular place of employment that was not their home, 1.46% worked from home, 9.18% had no regular place of employment, and 3.66% were unsure about or unable to identify their place of employment. 23.07% of workers had a paid job as a government employee, 10.32% as an employee of a statutory body, 49.72% as a private worker, 4.06% as a worker in a private home, 2.19% as a self-employed person with paid workers, 7.15% as a self-employed person without paid workers, 1.87% as someone with another worker status, and 1.62% did not know or did not specify their worker status.

== See also ==
- Parishes and dependencies of Antigua and Barbuda
- Barbuda
- Robin Yearwood
