= Willoughby Bay (Antigua) =

Bay in Antigua and Barbuda

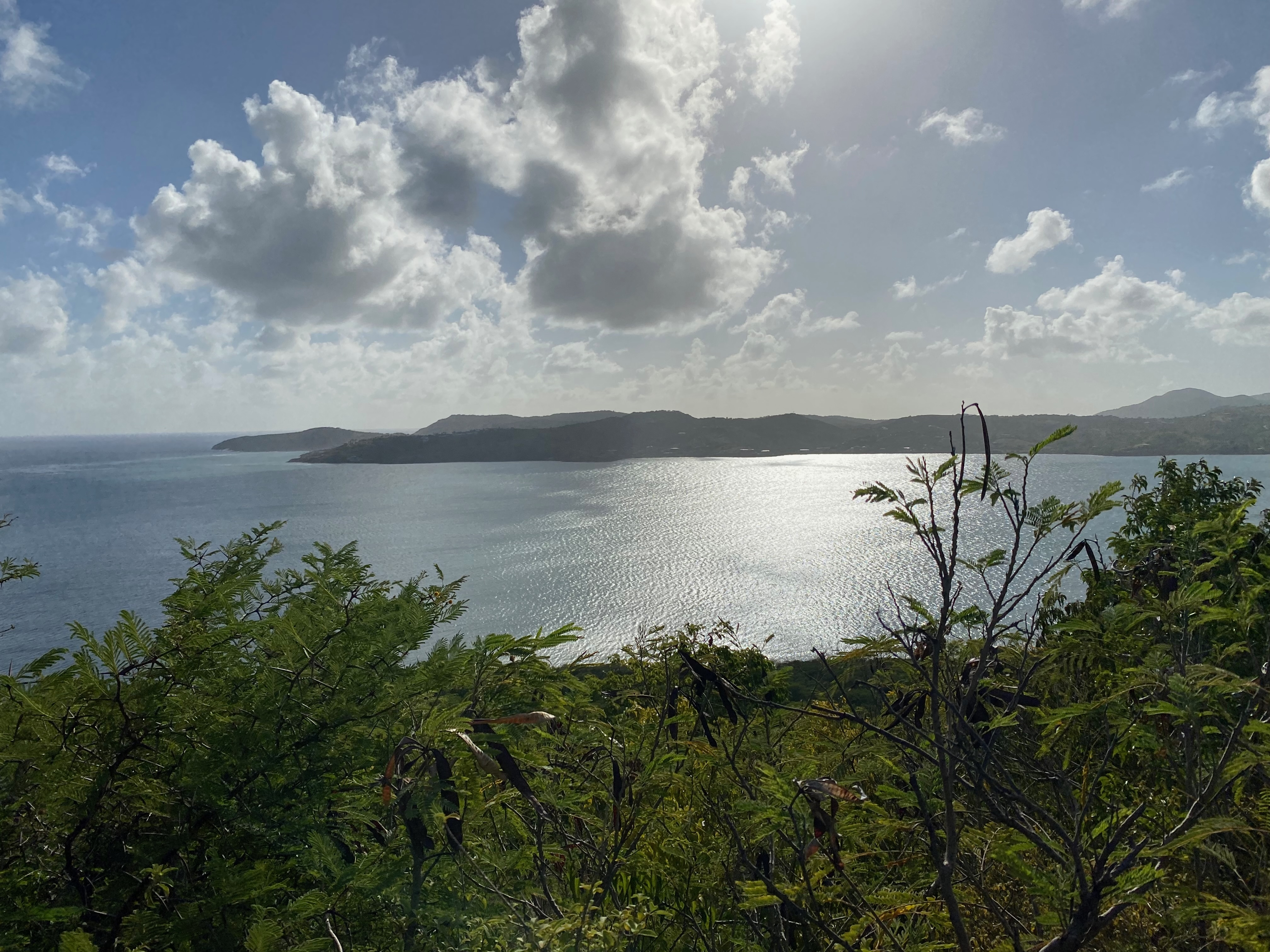
- Interactive map of Willoughby Bay
- Location: Antigua
- Coordinates: 17°02′N 61°44′W
- Part of: Atlantic Ocean
- Settlements: Bethesda; Christian Hill; Collins; Dow Hill; St. Philip's

Willoughby Bay is a large bay on the southeastern coast of Antigua island, in Antigua and Barbuda.

Christian Cove is located in the bay.
