= National Cultural Heritage of Antigua and Barbuda =

National heritage register of Antigua and Barbuda

The National Cultural Heritage of Antigua and Barbuda refers to a human artifact or place in Antigua and Barbuda officially recognized by the Cultural Heritage Unit of the National Parks Authority. It was introduced in 2025 following an act of parliament. Under the law, objects of cultural heritage must be at least fifty years old and have significant cultural value to the country. The National Advisory Committee must conduct a thorough investigation to determine a site's notability.
