= Government ministries of Antigua and Barbuda =

The government of Antigua and Barbuda consists of eleven ministries.

== Current ministries ==
| Ministry | Minister | Permanent secretary |
|---|---|---|
| Ministry of Finance, Corporate Governance and Public Private Partnerships | Gaston Browne | Edson Joseph, Suann Simon, Faustina Joseph |
| Ministry of Legal Affairs, Public Safety, Information and Labour | Steadroy Benjamin | Hildred Simpson, Janice Michael |
| Ministry of Health, Wellness, Environment and Civil Service Affairs | Michael Joseph | Stacey Gregg-Paige, Francia Sheppard |
| Ministry of Foreign Affairs, Trade and Immigration | Paul Chet Greene | Sharon Stevens, Colin O'Keiffe |
| Ministry of Agriculture, Lands and the Blue Economy | Anthony Smith | Walter Christopher, Sharolyn Mathews |
| Ministry of Tourism, Civil Aviation, Transportation and Investment | Charles Fernandez | Sean Cenac, Joan Joseph |
| Ministry of Information Communication Technologies, Utilities and Energy | Melford Nicholas | Olivette Williams |
| Ministry of Housing and Works | Maria Browne | Sandra Joseph |
| Ministry of Education, Science and Technology | Daryll Matthew | Ena Dalso Henry |
| Ministry of Social and Urban Transformation | Rawdon Turner | Rosa Greenaway, Sara E. Stuart |
| Ministry of Sports and Creative Industries | Dwayne George | Clarence Pilgrim |
