= Victoria Park Botanical Gardens =

Botanical garden in St. John's, Antigua and Barbuda

Coordinates: 17°7′12.23″N 61°50′16.71″W

The park in August 2026

The Victoria Park Botanical Gardens (VPBG) is a 5.9-acre (2.4 ha) botanical garden in St. John's, Antigua and Barbuda. It is also home to the Government Complex, the seat of the government of Antigua and Barbuda which contains the parliament building, the prime minister's office, and the high court. It is part of The Queen's Commonwealth Canopy. It was established in 1893 and is one of the few parks in the city. It is also an important cultural site and is under the stewardship of the Department of the Environment.

There are over 4,000 fructifying trees in the park and there are several public events here, including yoga, movie showings, and art exhibitions. Prince Harry visited the park on 22 November 2016 and planted a lignum vitae here. It is open from 6 am to 10 pm daily and it is expected that visitors are "properly clad" and of orderly conduct. It is protected under the Botanical Gardens Act of 1900.

The park also contains the Rising Sun cricket grounds.
