= Prime Minister of Antigua and Barbuda =

Head of government

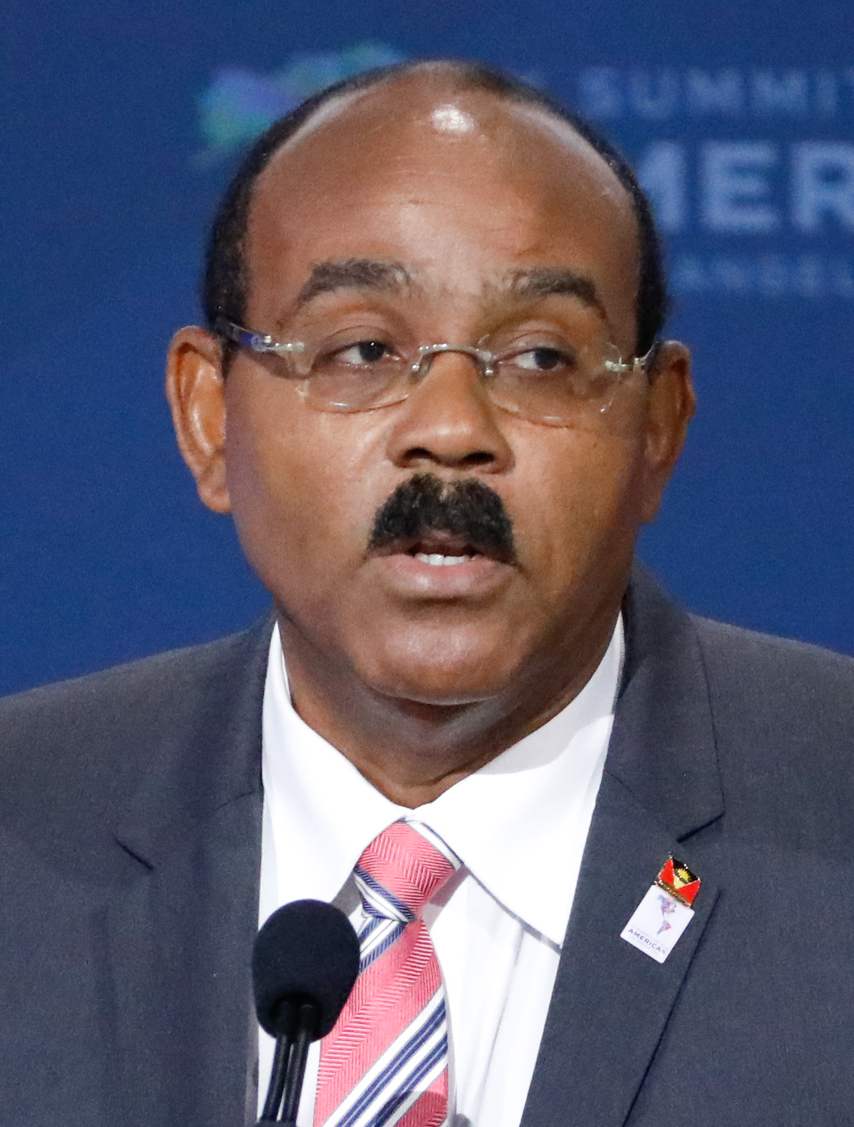
- Incumbent; Gaston Browne since 13 June 2014
- Style: The Right Honourable; His Excellency (diplomatic)
- Member of: Cabinet, National Security Council
- Appointer: Governor-General; Prime minister must have support of the majority of members of the House of Representatives
- Term length: Five years; renewable
- Formation: 1 November 1981
- First holder: Vere Bird
- Deputy: Deputy Prime Minister of Antigua and Barbuda
- Salary: EC$150,000 / US$55,555 annually
- Website: ab.gov.ag

The prime minister of Antigua and Barbuda is the head of government of Antigua and Barbuda. The prime minister of Antigua and Barbuda is appointed by the Governor-General. The prime minister chairs the Cabinet, selects its ministers, and exercises much of the executive powers afforded to the office under the Constitution. The prime minister holds office by virtue of their ability to command the confidence of the House of Representatives, of which they must be an elected member of.

The power of the prime minister has fluctuated throughout the position's existence. While the Governor-General has been described as the de facto head of state, in whom all executive power is vested in, the prime minister has always been the head of government and has exercised his powers similar in fashion to an executive president in most liberal democracies. The prime minister, along with Cabinet, is responsible for proposing new legislation and setting an agenda, usually codified by acts of parliament or statutory instruments.

The history of such an office began in 1872 with the colonial president, who oversaw the island in subordination to the island's governor. This office was later superseded by the positions of administrator, chief minister, and premier, each of which gaining more executive power as the islands moved toward independence. Four men have served as prime minister, the first being Vere Bird taking office on 1 November 1981. The longest serving prime minister was also Vere Bird, who served for 12 years, and the shortest serving was his son Lester, who served for ten years. Gaston Browne succeeded Baldwin Spencer as prime minister on 13 June 2014, following the 2014 general election. The prime minister works at the Office of the Prime Minister and Ministry of Foreign Affairs building.

== History ==
Since colonial times, various officials have acted as the head of government in Antigua and Barbuda. In 1872, the position of colonial president was established, which was the first time that executive functions were fully separated from the archipelago's governor. The president of Antigua essentially exercised the same functions that the governor of Antigua had prior to being assigned responsibility over the entire British Leeward Islands. Following the abolition of the presidency, the position of administrator was established, who took up residence in Government House and eventually had a major power expansion in the 1959 constitutional amendment. The position of administrator still remained more akin to a subordinated governor rather than that of the modern day prime minister.

On 1 January 1960, the position of chief minister was established, the inaugural holder being Vere Bird. The chief minister was appointed by the administrator and was the member of the now-elected Legislative Council who could command the support of the majority of members. The chief minister was also granted the ability to form an Executive Council, which has since been replaced by the Cabinet. The direct precursor to the position of prime minister was that of premier, which was first proposed during the 1966 Antigua Constitutional Conference in the prelude to associated statehood. On 27 February 1967, the position of administrator was abolished and the island's head of government became once again directly subordinated to the now fully-local governor. Legally, the position of premier was nearly identical to that of the prime minister today– the premier was appointed by the governor and a Westminster system was established. The creation of the office of premier also coincided with the start of presidentialisation in Antiguan and Barbudan politics, with Antiguans and Barbudans beginning to feel that they themselves elected their premier and that their premier was the de facto figurehead of the emerging nation. During the 1971 general election that put George Walter into power, candidates for the premiership began to directly accuse each other of corruption and responsibility for their party's actions, introducing the premier as the new leader of Antiguan and Barbudan society. This continued until the independence process of Antigua and Barbuda starting in the late 1970s.

The position of prime minister was for the most part legally identical to that of the premier. The prime minister was now appointed by a governor-general and similarly required the confidence of the House of Representatives in order to be appointed to the role. In the 1980s and early 1990s, Vere Bird, with the support of Parliament, began to consolidate power in a manner that established him as the "father of the nation" and essentially gave him complete control of the military and economy. The Bird family's grip on power continued throughout the 1990s and early 2000s with the rise of Lester Bird to the premiership. Lester Bird used his control of the security forces and media to aid the expansion of prime ministerial powers, along with falsified elections that created a political dynasty and ended Antigua and Barbuda's status as a full democracy. However, reforms in 2001 caused a reduction of the prime minister's unofficial hard power and the start of the modern Antiguan and Barbudan political system.

Today, the prime minister continues to be considered by the public as the face of Antiguan and Barbudan politics as well as the leader of the country. The prime minister is a public figure who makes binding decisions on the central government's agenda and tends to face little obstacles from the governing party and Parliament. As all prime ministers have been the leaders of their respective parties, the prime minister also tends to have influence over the party's candidate slate and ideology.

== Selection process ==
The Constitution of Antigua and Barbuda regulates that the prime minister must be a member of the House of Representatives who is the leader in the House of the political party that has the support of the majority of members of the House of Representatives. If there is no party that has an undisputed leader, or no party that maintains the support of the majority of the House of Representatives, the Governor-General may appoint a member that is most likely to maintain the support of the majority of the members, and who is willing to hold the role of prime minister.

As an elected member of the House of Representatives, the prime minister must also:

- be a citizen of Antigua and Barbuda at least 21 years of age;
- reside in Antigua and Barbuda for at least twelve months prior to election;
- and be able to speak and read English, unless incapacitated by blindness, with sufficient proficiency to participate in House proceedings.

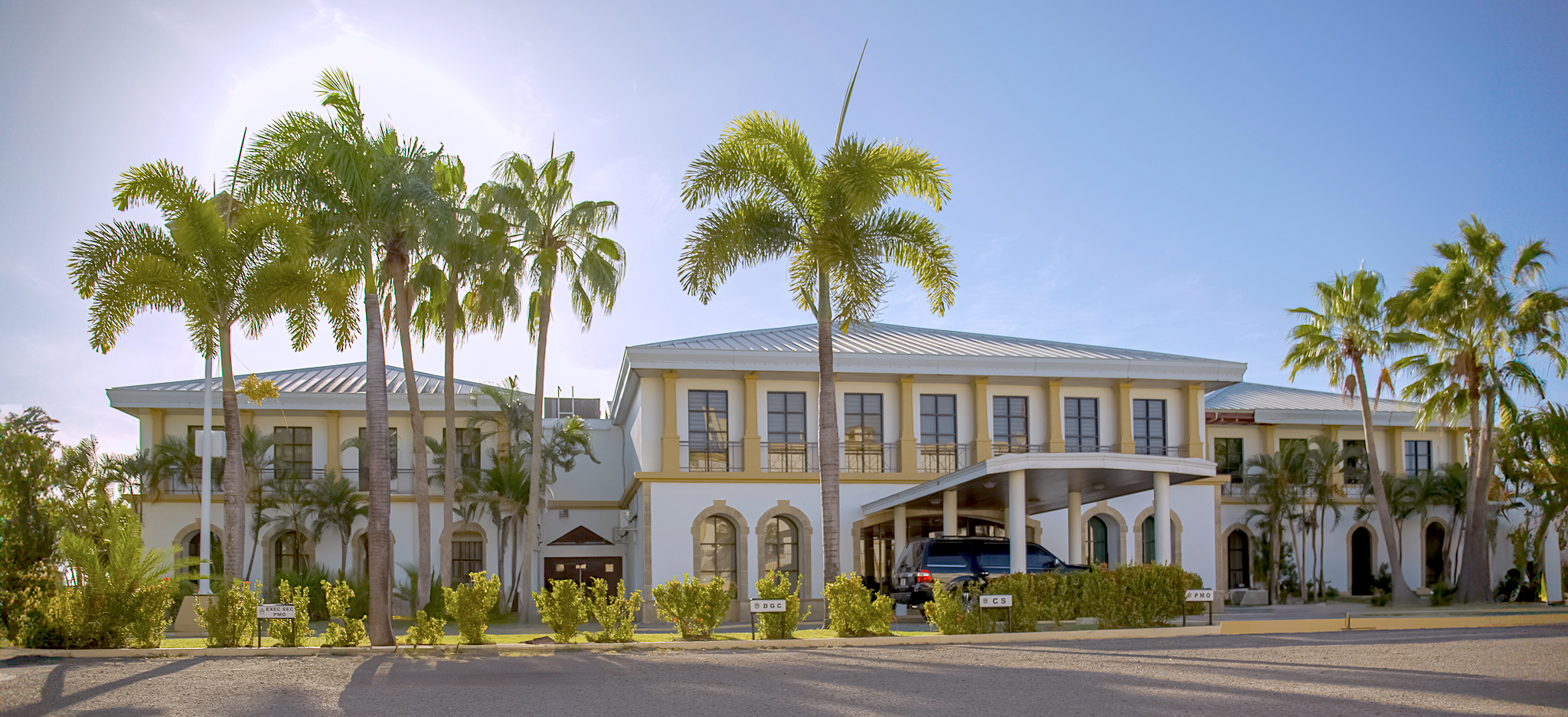
The Office of the Prime Minister of Antigua and Barbuda is located in Botanical Gardens. It however is not the official residence. V.C. Bird used Tomlinson House as his official residence. Funds to build an official residence for the prime minister were instead used to build the Sir Vivian Richards Stadium.

If a prime minister must be appointed while Parliament is dissolved, then, a person who was a member of the House of Representatives immediately before the dissolution may be appointed as prime minister.

All prime ministers have been the leader of their political party, thus, a prospective prime minister must first be elected as party leader during the party convention that is usually held biennially.

=== Acting prime minister ===
The Governor-General may authorize another member of the Cabinet to perform those functions (other than the functions conferred by section 74(2) of the constitution) when the Prime Minister is not present in Antigua and Barbuda or is unable to do so due to illness or because of the restrictions of section 73(4) of this Constitution. That member may perform those functions until the Governor-General revokes his authority.

== Responsibilities ==
The prime minister advises the Governor-General on appointments to the Cabinet of Antigua and Barbuda. Only the Prime Minister or, in his absence, the Minister the Prime Minister appoints in that regard, may call the Cabinet to order. Under section 73 of the constitution, the Governor-General must dismiss the Prime Minister or dissolve parliament in the event of a successful vote of no confidence.

== See also ==
- Politics of Antigua and Barbuda
- Prime Minister of the West Indies Federation
- Governor-General of Antigua and Barbuda
