= History of Antigua and Barbuda (2004–2014) =

Post-Bird era
- 2004–2014
Late Bird era (1994–2004)	2014–present
- Prime Minister: Baldwin Spencer

The history of Antigua and Barbuda from 2004 until 2014 began with the first democratic transfer of power in Antigua and Barbuda since 1976, and ended with the election of Gaston Browne as prime minister in 2014.

== 2004–2009 ==
After the establishment of the Antigua and Barbuda Electoral Commission in 2001, the country began to return to democracy after nearly about half a century of Bird family rule, excluding a brief period in the 1970s when the family was removed from political power for five years. On 23 March 2004, the first democratic elections since independence were held, resulting in the United Progressive Party and its allies winning a combined total of thirteen seats in Parliament. Spencer was sworn in the next day, and due to now-improved ties between the islands, a Barbudan was appointed to the Cabinet for the first time. Following this election, the first few years of the UPP administration were focused on ending corruption, and by 2007 a new governor-general was appointed, Louise Lake-Tack. Also in 2007, Antigua hosted the Cricket World Cup, but due to unsafe conditions at the Sir Vivian Richards Stadium, the government was publicly humiliated. However, Antigua and Barbuda was able to defeat the United States in a court case involving its online gambling industry, resulting in an increased standing in the non-aligned world and assuming of the leadership of the Group of 77. In 2008, a wave of crime began, resulting in the Antigua honeymoon murders and cramping of inmates in the country's only prison, resulting in a deterioration of the tourism industry's reputation. The Allen Stanford controversy served as a final blow to the government's reputation, just a month before the general election.

== 2009–2014 ==
On 12 March 2009, a general election was held. It was the closest election in the country's history until 2023. Spencer was sworn in as prime minister the next day, but doubts began to surface. The Labour Party successfully petitioned to the high court for results in four constituencies to be annulled on 21 March, but the decision was successfully appealed by the government on 24 October 2010. Due to the financial crisis, unemployment rose by twenty percent, and the reputation of the UPP government began to disintegrate. The citizenship by investment program was also introduced during this time, which resulted in heavy criticism and the dismissal of four dissenting senators. Electoral reenrollment around this time was also plagued with obstacles. While Antigua and Barbuda retained a relatively high human development index during this period, the aftermath of the financial crisis resulted in a decline that did not recover until 2013.
