= Science and technology in Antigua and Barbuda =

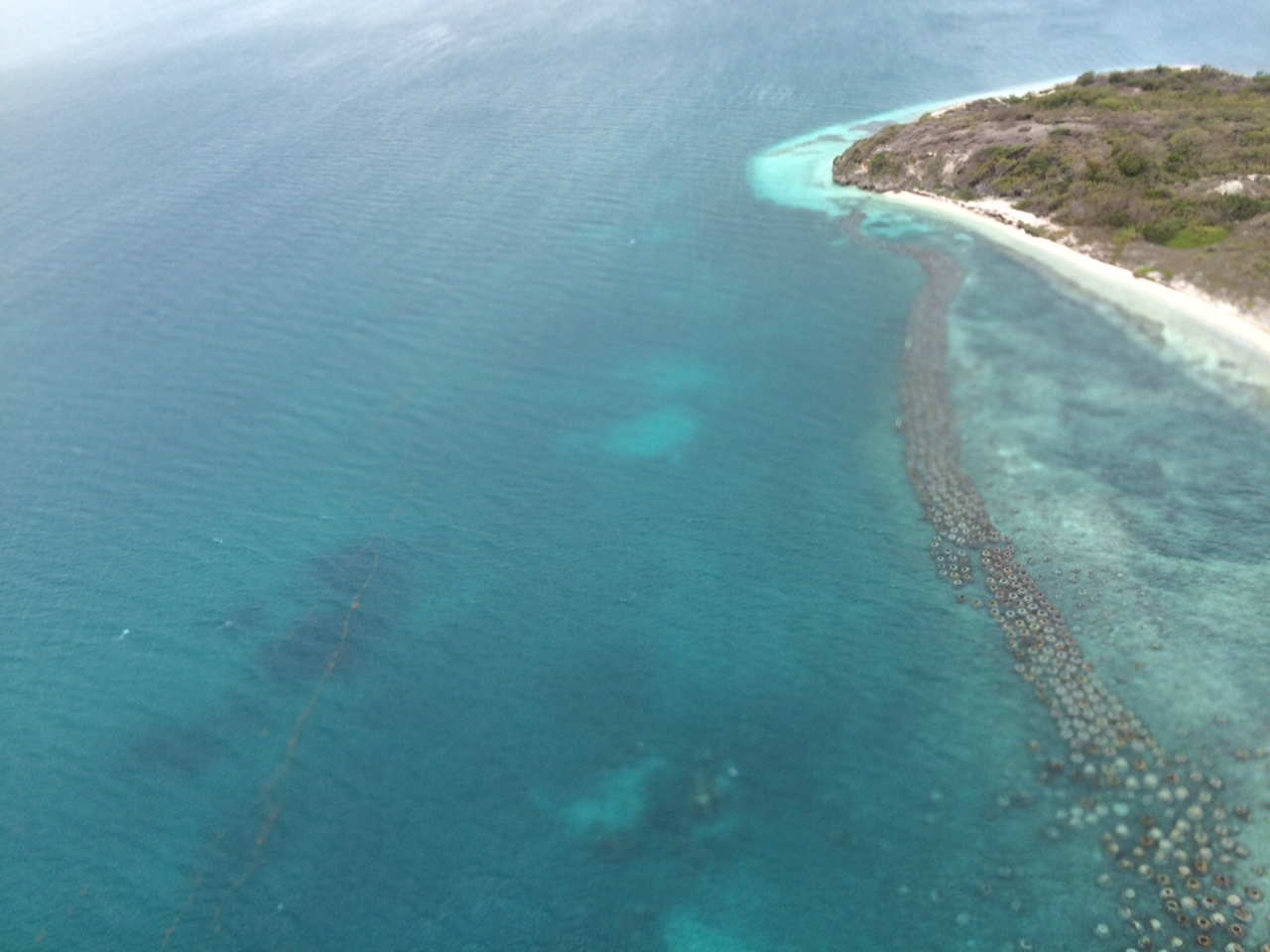
Artificial reefs on Maiden Island

Science and technology in Antigua and Barbuda describes the scientific and technological progress made by the country. Antigua and Barbuda's history of science and technology dates back to colonial times, with the sector being overseen by the Ministry of Education, Sports and Creative Industries.

== Overview ==
Antigua and Barbuda has had a history of science and technology since the colonial era. In the 1940s, radio broadcasting was introduced to the island, and local broadcasting by ABS commenced in 1962. In 1965, television was brought to the island, later being nationalised as ABS TV in the 1970s. During the Space Race, Antigua hosted the Dow Hill tracking station, which became operational in 1967. With the introduction of the internet in the 1990s, Antigua and Barbuda became one of the first countries in the Caribbean to establish an internet-based economic sector, developing a controversial online gambling industry.

The government of Antigua and Barbuda has increasingly prioritized science and technology in its development agenda. A dedicated Ministry of Education, Science and Technology (now Ministry of Education, Sports and Creative Industries) has overseen initiatives to integrate technology in education. In 2013, the government launched the Government Assisted Technology Endeavour program aiming to transform the nation into the "ICT capital of the Caribbean". The government also created the Connect Antigua and Barbuda Initiative, establishing community computer access centers and mobile IT classrooms. To further institutionalise scientific development, in 2023 the Cabinet announced plans (with support from the International Atomic Energy Agency) to establish a new Institute of Applied Sciences and Research.

== Education ==
Antigua and Barbuda maintains a high literacy rate of about 99% and is home to many tertiary institutions such as the University of the West Indies at Five Islands, the Antigua and Barbuda International Institute of Technology, and the Antigua State College. UWI Five Islands hosts a School of Science, Computing and Artificial Intelligence. At the primary and secondary levels, the government and partners have invested in ICT integration. Private and civil society initiatives have complemented government efforts. Since 2008, the Rotary Club has donated roughly 10,000 computers to schools across the country. In 2025, the club donated 1,500 new laptops and networking infrastructure.

== Research ==
Antigua and Barbuda has active fields of agricultural, medical, and environmental research. Agricultural science and environmental research in Antigua and Barbuda have been oriented toward self-sufficiency and sustainability. At the Betty's Hope research farm, Caribbean Agricultural Research and Development Institute scientists and the Ministry of Agriculture have worked on developing resilient crop varieties (such as drought-tolerant corn, peppers, and sweet potatoes) and maintaining seed banks of local genetic material.

Antigua and Barbuda has a significant history of environmental research, with the Environmental Awareness Group and other local entities successfully conserving the Antiguan racer snake, which numbered at about fifty individuals in the mid-1990s. Antigua and Barbuda is also active in climate change research, having developed various climate change risk models for the country and analysing climate-change related threats to the country. Antigua and Barbuda has also piloted mangrove restoration, artificial reefs, and sustainable aquaculture.

Antigua and Barbuda also hosts a utility-scale solar photovoltaic plant at Bethesda, and is actively researching wind power. In Crabbs, there is a dual-fuel liquefied natural gas plant, and Antigua and Barbuda has investigated the implementation of geothermal energy in the future.
