= Cabinet of Antigua and Barbuda =

Executive branch of the government of Antigua and Barbuda

- Coat of arms of Antigua and Barbuda

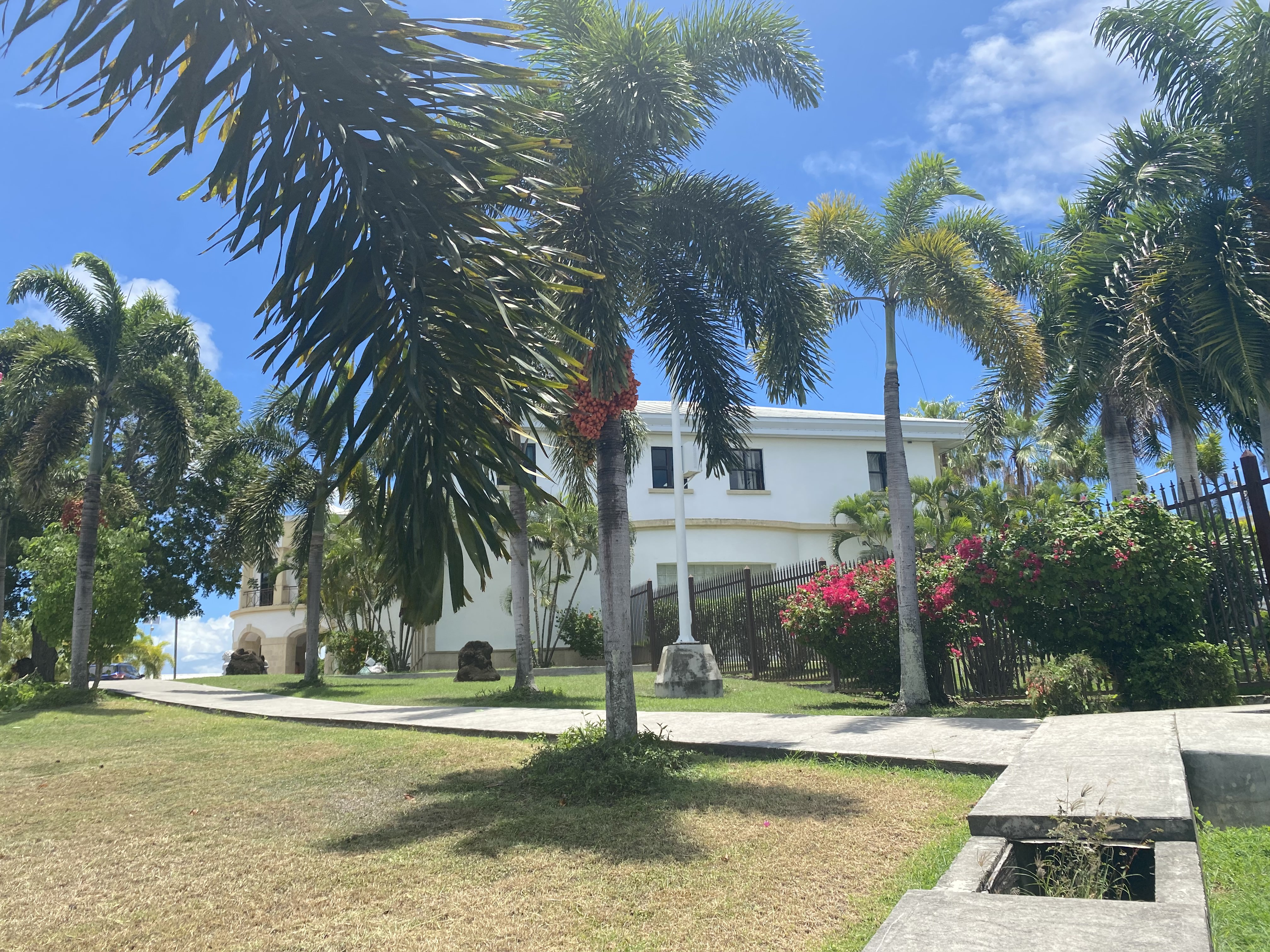
- Office of the Prime Minister and Ministry of Foreign Affairs
- Formation: November 1, 1981; 45 years ago
- Legal status: Established by the Constitution of Antigua and Barbuda
- Headquarters: Office of the Prime Minister and Ministry of Foreign Affairs
- Prime Minister: Gaston Browne
- Website: https://ab.gov.ag/detail_page.php?page=10

The Cabinet of Antigua and Barbuda is the executive branch of the government of Antigua and Barbuda. Section 70(1) of the Constitution establishes the Cabinet. The Cabinet is made up of the Prime Minister and as many other Ministers as the Prime Minister deems necessary, one of whom will be the Attorney-General and will be nominated in accordance with section 69 of the Constitution. Only the Prime Minister or, in his absence, the Minister the Prime Minister appoints in that regard, may call the Cabinet to order.

The Governor-General may authorize another member of the Cabinet to perform those functions (other than the functions conferred by subsection (2) of this section) when the Prime Minister is not present in Antigua and Barbuda or is unable to do so due to illness or because of the restrictions of section 73(4) of this Constitution. That member may perform those functions until the Governor-General revokes his authority.

A Secretary to the Cabinet is employed, and their position will be public. In accordance with any instructions the Prime Minister may give him, the Secretary to the Cabinet, who will be in charge of the Cabinet office, is in charge of organizing the agenda for the Cabinet meetings, maintaining the minutes of those meetings, relaying the decisions made by the Cabinet to the proper parties, among other duties as the Prime Minister may specify. Before beginning his official duties, the Secretary to the Cabinet must take the oath of secrecy and sign it.

== Composition ==
Ministry	Minister
Ministry of Finance, Corporate Governance and Public Private Partnerships	Gaston Browne
Ministry of Legal Affairs, Public Safety, Information and Labour	Steadroy Benjamin
Ministry of Health, Wellness, Environment and Civil Service Affairs	Michael Joseph
Ministry of Foreign Affairs, Trade and Immigration	Paul Chet Greene
Ministry of Agriculture, Lands and the Blue Economy	Anthony Smith
Ministry of Tourism, Civil Aviation, Transportation and Investment	Charles Fernandez
Ministry of Information Communication Technologies, Utilities and Energy	Melford Nicholas
Ministry of Housing and Works	Maria Browne
Ministry of Education, Science and Technology	Daryll Matthew
Ministry of Social and Urban Transformation	Rawdon Turner
Ministry of Sports and Creative Industries	Dwayne George

== See also ==
- Executive branch of Antigua and Barbuda
- Government ministries of Antigua and Barbuda
