= Mullany =

Mullany is a surname. Notable people with the surname include:

- Charlie Mullany (1881–1937), Australian footballer
- James Robert Madison Mullany (1818–1887), US Navy rear admiral
- John Mullany, Australian politician
- Kate Mullany (1845–1906), American female labor leader
- Mitch Mullany (1968–2008), American comedian, actor and screenwriter
- Patrick Mullany, FBI instructor and agent who co-pioneered offender profiling
- Peter Mullany, Australian guitarist for Johnny Dole & The Scabs
- Antigua honeymoon murders of newlyweds Ben (1977–2008) and Catherine Mullany (1977–2008)
- Patrick Francis Mullany, known as Brother Azarias, Irish-American essayist

== See also ==
- Mullaney
