= Ministry of Foreign Affairs, Trade and Immigration =

Foreign ministry

- Logo

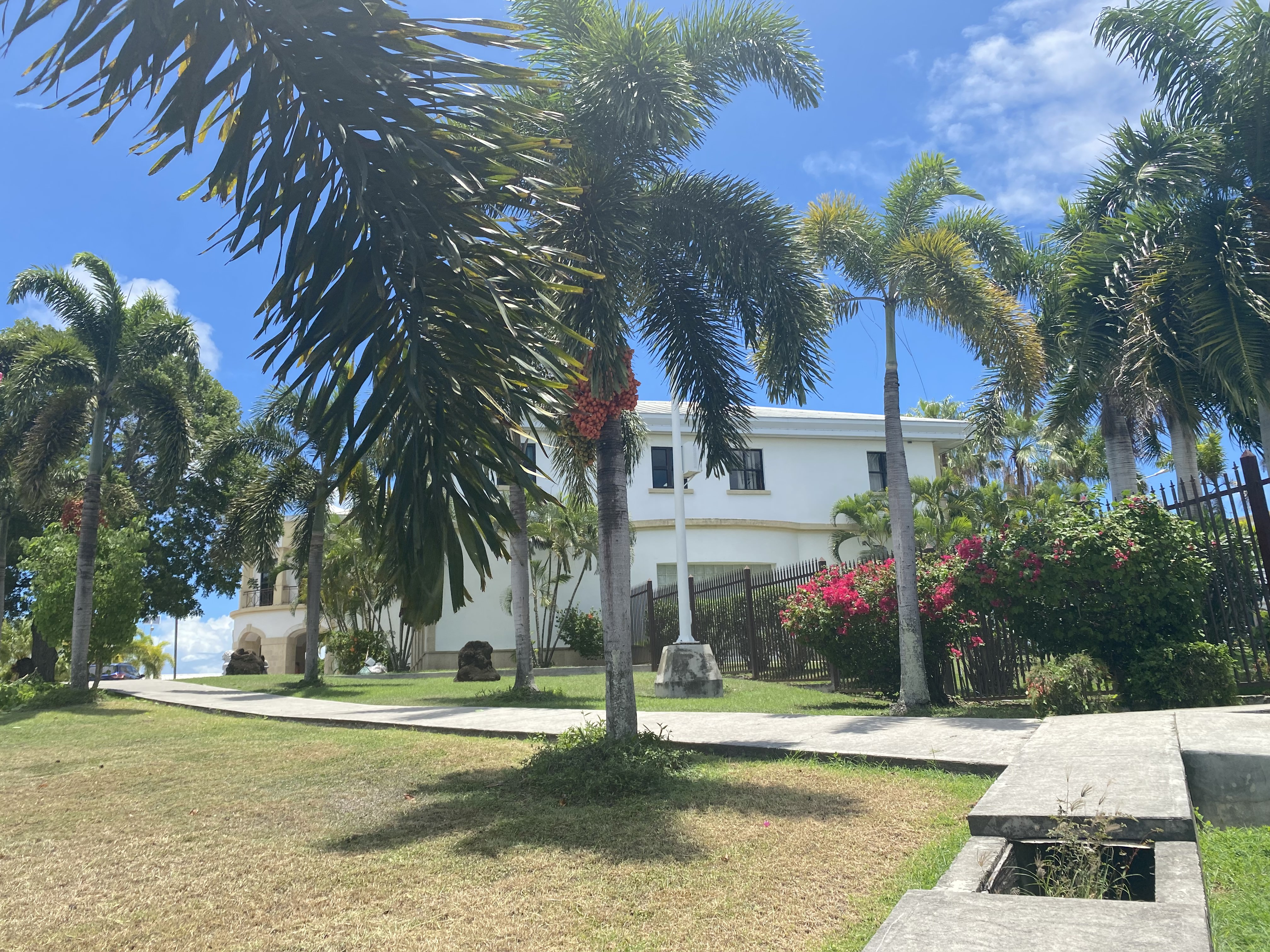
- Office of the Prime Minister and Ministry of Foreign Affairs

Agency overview
- Jurisdiction: Government of Antigua and Barbuda
- Headquarters: Office of the Prime Minister and Ministry of Foreign Affairs
- Agency executive: Paul Chet Greene, Minister
- Website: https://foreignaffairs.gov.ag/

The Ministry of Foreign Affairs, Trade and Immigration is a Cabinet-level governmental agency in Antigua and Barbuda responsible for conducting and organising foreign affairs, trade, and Barbuda affairs.

== Responsibilities ==
- Overseas missions
- International trade
- Regional trade
- Manufacturing
- Industry
- Commerce
- Consumer affairs
- Entrepreneurship
- Barbuda affairs
- Sustainable development
- Caribbean Community
- Organisation of Eastern Caribbean States
- World Trade Organization
- Free Trade Zone

=== Subordinate agencies ===
- Central Marketing Corporation
- National Parks Authority
- Diaspora Unit
- Enterprise Development Fund
- Bureau of Standards
- Statistics Division

== See also ==
- Cabinet of Antigua and Barbuda
- Foreign relations of Antigua and Barbuda
