= Queen Elizabeth II National Trust =

National trust arranging covenants to protect private land in New Zealand

QEII National Trust
- Formation: 1977
- Founder: Gordon Stephenson
- Type: Independent Charitable Trust
- Headquarters: Wellington, New Zealand
- Location: New Zealand
- Members: 4,500
- Board of directors: James Guild, Sue Yerex, Bruce Wills, Gina Solomon, Donna Field, Graham Mourie
- Website: qeiinationaltrust.org.nz

The Queen Elizabeth II National Trust (QEII) is a registered charity and statutory New Zealand organisation independent from the government and managed by a board of directors. It was established in 1977 by the Queen Elizabeth the Second National Trust Act 1977 "to encourage and promote, for the benefit of New Zealand, the provision, protection, preservation and enhancement of open space."

QEII enables landowners to protect special features on their land through its open space covenants. QEII does this by partnering with private landowners to protect natural and cultural heritage sites on their land with covenants. The landowner continues to own and manage the protected land, and the covenant and protection stays on the land, even when the property is sold to a new owner.

Open space is defined in the QEII National Trust Act as any area of land or body of water that serves to preserve or to facilitate the preservation of any landscape of aesthetic, cultural, recreational, scenic, scientific, or social interest or value.

QEII covenants consist of a network of over 4,400 protected areas throughout New Zealand, ranging from small backyard patches to huge swathes of high country. These covenants protect more than 180,000 ha of private land, and play a hugely critical role as a refuge for some of New Zealand's rarest and most endangered biodiversity and ecosystems.

QEII also delivered New Zealand's contribution to the Queen's Commonwealth Canopy Initiative (QCC). This is a worldwide initiative set up to mark Queen Elizabeth II's reign and leadership of the Commonwealth. It aims to create a network of native forest throughout the Commonwealth, and QEII is the link to the QCC in New Zealand.

The National Trust puts a high priority on securing covenants that support the objectives of the New Zealand Biodiversity Strategy.

== History ==
QEII National Trust was set up in 1977, with the intention that it was set up by farmers for farmers and other landowners at a time when the New Zealand government offered subsidies to encourage bush and wetland clearance on farms. There was a desire in the community among farmers and other landowners to protect areas on private land that were home to native species. Their vision was for protection to be both voluntary and everlasting, legally protecting the land forever.

QEII was founded by Gordon Stephenson, who was also the first covenantor.

Founder Gordon Stephenson died in December 2015.

== Governance ==
QEII is an independent charitable trust, rather than a government institution.

The board is responsible for executive control and management of the QEII National Trust.

QEII is governed by a board of directors. The board is made up of six directors. The minister of conservation appoints four directors who have the right mix of environmental and conservation values, and who can reflect the interests of rural landowners, and the interests of the Māori community. QEII National Trust members elect the remaining two directors.

== Legislation ==
QEII was established in 1977 by the Queen Elizabeth the Second National Trust Act 1977 "to encourage and promote, for the benefit of New Zealand, the provision, protection, preservation and enhancement of open space."

The act establishing the QEII National Trust as a statutory organisation independent from government, and gives them power to protect open space in Aotearoa. Specifically it can:

- Register open space covenants to protect land forever
- Manage land QEII owns
- Advise the minister of conservation, and other ministers as appropriate, on matters related to open space
- Promote research into matters related to open space
- Provide grants for projects related to open space

As well as their own Act, QEII also often interact with the following legislation:

- Conservation Act 1987
- Overseas Investment Act 2005
- Crown Pastoral Land Act 1998
- Resource Management Act 1991
- Te Ture Whenua Maori Act 1993
- Walking Access Act 2008
