= The Queen's Commonwealth Canopy =

Network of forest conservation initiatives

- Official logo
- Location: Commonwealth of Nations
- Also known as: QCC
- Cause: Forest conservation campaign
- Launched: 27 November 2015 by Queen Elizabeth II
- Website: queenscommonwealthcanopy.org

The Queen's Commonwealth Canopy (QCC) is an initiative begun in 2015 as a network of forest conservation programmes throughout the 54 countries of the Commonwealth of Nations. By 2016, 16 countries had become involved and, by 2023, the number was 54.

== Origins ==
The idea was conceived in the 2000s by Member of Parliament Frank Field, but, was met by apathy from the political establishment. When he raised the idea at a Buckingham Palace meeting, the concept found support from Queen Elizabeth II. The project was launched in 2015 when an appeal was made to all 53 Commonwealth nations to contribute areas of indigenous forest to be preserved in perpetuity to mark Her Majesty's lifetime of service to the Commonwealth.It is the first environmental enterprise the Queen gave her name to. After approval and endorsement by the QCC, the projects are added to the network and "placed under the protection of the Queen herself."

== Launch ==
The initiative was officially launched at the Commonwealth Heads of Government Meeting in Malta in 2015. The Queen said, "this, and other initiatives, are a practical demonstration of the power of the Commonwealth, working as a group, to effect real change for generations to come." At that time, seven countries were involved, with Singapore being the first, which was acknowledged by Anne, Princess Royal, during a visit there.

The three organisations behind the project are The Royal Commonwealth Society (RCS), the Commonwealth Forestry Association, and Cool Earth and its aim is to establish a global network of protected indigenous forests, through "raising awareness within the Commonwealth of the value of indigenous forests and to saving them for future generations"; generating "a unique network of forest conservation projects that brings collective credibility and integrity to individual Commonwealth countries"; raising "the profile of the Commonwealth, demonstrating the capacity of its 56 member countries to act together as one to ensure forest conservation"; using "the Commonwealth network to facilitate knowledge exchange, share best practice, and create new collaborative initiatives for forest conservation"; and creating "a physical and lasting legacy of The Queen's leadership of the Commonwealth".

== Progress ==
ITV broadcast The Queen's Green Planet in April 2018, highlighting many of the initiatives around the world interspersed with footage of the Queen and Sir David Attenborough discussing trees in the gardens of Buckingham Palace; By this time, more than 40 countries had committed to taking part in the initiative. it showcased the "personal stake the royal family and other prominent ambassadors have in conservation efforts." By mid-2019, the number had reached 46 countries. The RCS stated in 2023 that 54 countries were committed to the QCC, bringing 115 sites and projects, totalling some 12 million hectares (29,652,646 acres) of forest, under its umbrella.

In addition to its three sites within the QCC, Australia contributes via the Australian Centre for International Agricultural Research, which is part of the country's foreign aid program.

== Projects ==
Country	Location	Approx. area	QCC link
Angola	Luengue-Luiana National Park		
Antigua and Barbuda	Victoria Park Botanical Gardens	2.4 ha (5.9 acres)	
Australia	Bulburin National Park		
Australia	Cleland National Park		
Australia	Forests of K'gari (Fraser Island)		
Australia	20 Million Trees Programme	13,825 ha (34,160 acres)	
The Bahamas	Blue Hole Conservation Forest	32,774 acres (13,263 ha)	
Bangladesh	Pirgonj Reserve Forest	500 acres (200 ha)	
Barbados	Turner's Hall Wood	50 acres (20 ha)	
Belize	Chiquibul Forest	423,000 acres (171,000 ha)	
Bermuda	Walsingham Nature Reserve	23 acres (9.3 ha)	
Botswana	Thotayamarula Forest Conservation Area	192 ha (470 acres)	
Brunei	Berakas Forest Reserve	348 ha (860 acres)	
Brunei	Pulau Selirong Forest Reserve	2,566 ha (6,340 acres)	
Brunei	Ulu Temburong National Park		
Cameroon	Sangmelima Training and Research Forest	13,500 ha (33,000 acres)	
Canada	Great Bear Rainforest	64,000 km^{2} (25,000 mi^{2})	
Cyprus	Troodos National Forest Park	9,000 ha (22,000 acres)	
Dominica	Dominican forests		
Fiji	Colo-i-Suva Forest Park	92 ha (230 acres)	
Fiji	Emalu	7,400 ha (18,000 acres)	
Ghana	Cape Three Points Forest Reserve		
Grenada	Levera Wetland		
Guyana	Kanashen Amerindian Protected Area	7,000 km^{2} (2,700 mi^{2})	
India	Tillari Conservation Reserve	29.53 km^{2} (11.40 mi^{2})	
Jamaica	Dolphin Head Forest Reserve	1,167 ha (2,880 acres)	
Kenya	Mau Forest Complex	455,000 ha (1,120,000 acres)	
Kiribati	Aranuka Mangrove Preservation Project		
Malawi	Chimaliro Forest Reserve		
Malawi	Liwonde National Park	54,800 ha (135,000 acres)	
Malawi	Mangochi Forest Reserve	37,600 ha (93,000 acres)	
Malaysia	Raja Musa Forest Reserve	230 km^{2} (89 mi^{2})	
Maldives	Keylakunu	110 ha (270 acres)	
Maldives	Neykurendhoo Mangrove	169.3 ha (418 acres)	
Malta	Verdala Palace rehabilitation project	6.8 ha (17 acres)	
Mauritius	Black River Gorges National Park	71 km^{2} (27 mi^{2})	
Mauritius	Ilot Gabriel Nature Reserve		
Namibia	N/a'an ku sê Forest Conservation Revegetation Project		
Nauru	Nauru Project		
New Zealand	The Queen Elizabeth II National Trust	190,276.8 ha (470,184 acres)	
Nigeria	IITA Tree Heritage Park		
Nigeria	Kawari Forest Reserve	76.7 km^{2} (29.6 mi^{2})	
Pakistan	Sustainable Forest Management	7 areas	
Papua New Guinea	Orangerie Bay	16.2 km^{2} (6.3 mi^{2})	
Papua New Guinea	Papua New Guinea—North	1,500 km^{2} (580 mi^{2})	
Rwanda	Arboretum of Ruhande	500 acres (200 ha)	
Saint Kitts and Nevis	The Central Forest Reserve	40.3 km^{2} (15.6 mi^{2})	
Saint Lucia	The Castries Water Works Reserve	14 km^{2} (5.4 mi^{2})	
Saint Vincent and the Grenadines	The Vermont Nature Trail		
Samoa	O le Pūpū Puē National Park	12,000 acres (4,900 ha)	
Seychelles	Seychelles		
Sierra Leone	Tacugama Reserve	170.75 km^{2} (65.93 mi^{2})	
Singapore	Singapore Botanic Gardens	6 ha (15 acres)	
Singapore	Bukit Timah	163 ha (400 acres)	
South Africa	The Knysna and Tsitsikamma Forests of the Garden Route National Park	360 km^{2} (140 mi^{2})	
Sri Lanka	Restoration of Trincomalee forest land	10 ha (25 acres)	
Tonga	'Eua National Park		
Trinidad and Tobago	The Arena Forest Reserve	15.4 km^{2} (5.9 mi^{2})	
Tuvalu	The Queen Elizabeth II Park		
Uganda	Mount Elgon		
United Kingdom	Coed Gwent (Wentwood)		
United Kingdom	Epping Forest	24.76 km^{2} (9.56 mi^{2})	
United Kingdom	Hawcombe Woods National Nature Reserve	100 ha (250 acres)	
United Kingdom	Forest of Marston Vale	15,799 ha (39,040 acres)	
United Kingdom	The National Forest	200 mi^{2} (520 km^{2})	
Vanuatu			
Zambia			

== See also ==
- The Queen's Green Canopy
- Queen's Award for Forestry
- Queen Elizabeth Diamond Jubilee Wood
- List of Commonwealth organisations
