= Office of the Prime Minister and Ministry of Foreign Affairs =

Official working place of the Prime Minister of Antigua and Barbuda

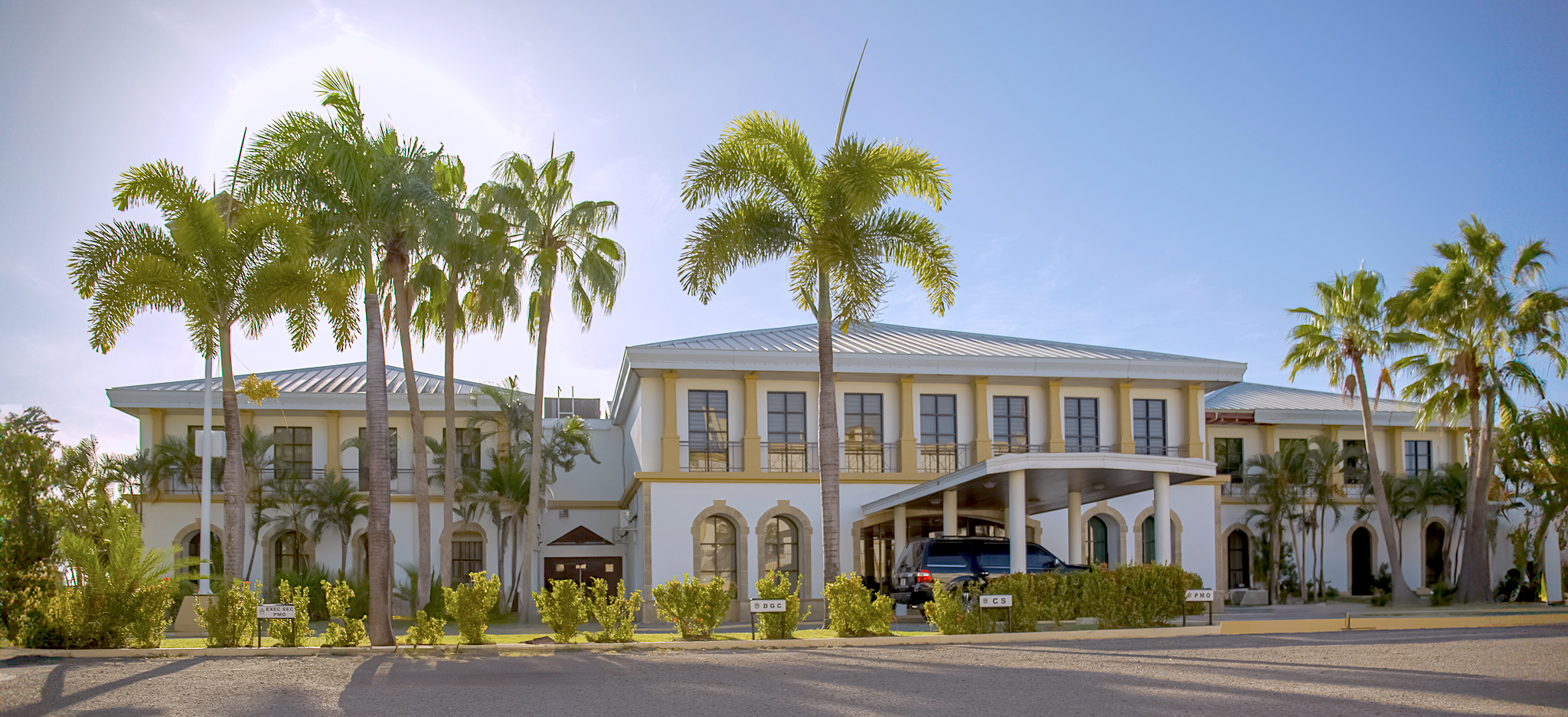
- Office of the Prime Minister and Ministry of Foreign Affairs in 2023

General information
- Location: St. John's, Antigua and Barbuda
- Coordinates: 17°07′06.20″N 61°50′02.45″W
- Current tenants: Prime Minister of Antigua and Barbuda
- Owner: Government of Antigua and Barbuda

Technical details
- Floor count: 2

The Office of the Prime Minister and Ministry of Foreign Affairs (OPM/MFA) is the headquarters of the executive branch of the Antiguan and Barbudan government. It houses the office of the Prime Minister, the cabinet, and the foreign ministry. It is located in the Government Complex in the Botanical Gardens of St. John's, directly adjacent to the parliament building. The building is not open to the public and is used for various official functions, including courtesy calls (presentations of credentials are done at Government House), cabinet and National Security Council meetings, and various other functions.

The prime minister does not have an official residence. Vere Bird used Tomlinson House as his official residence, although currently the prime minister commutes to his office with the private home having protection from various national security agencies. Similarly, security checks are mandatory for all persons wishing to enter the OPM/MFA building.

== Gallery ==
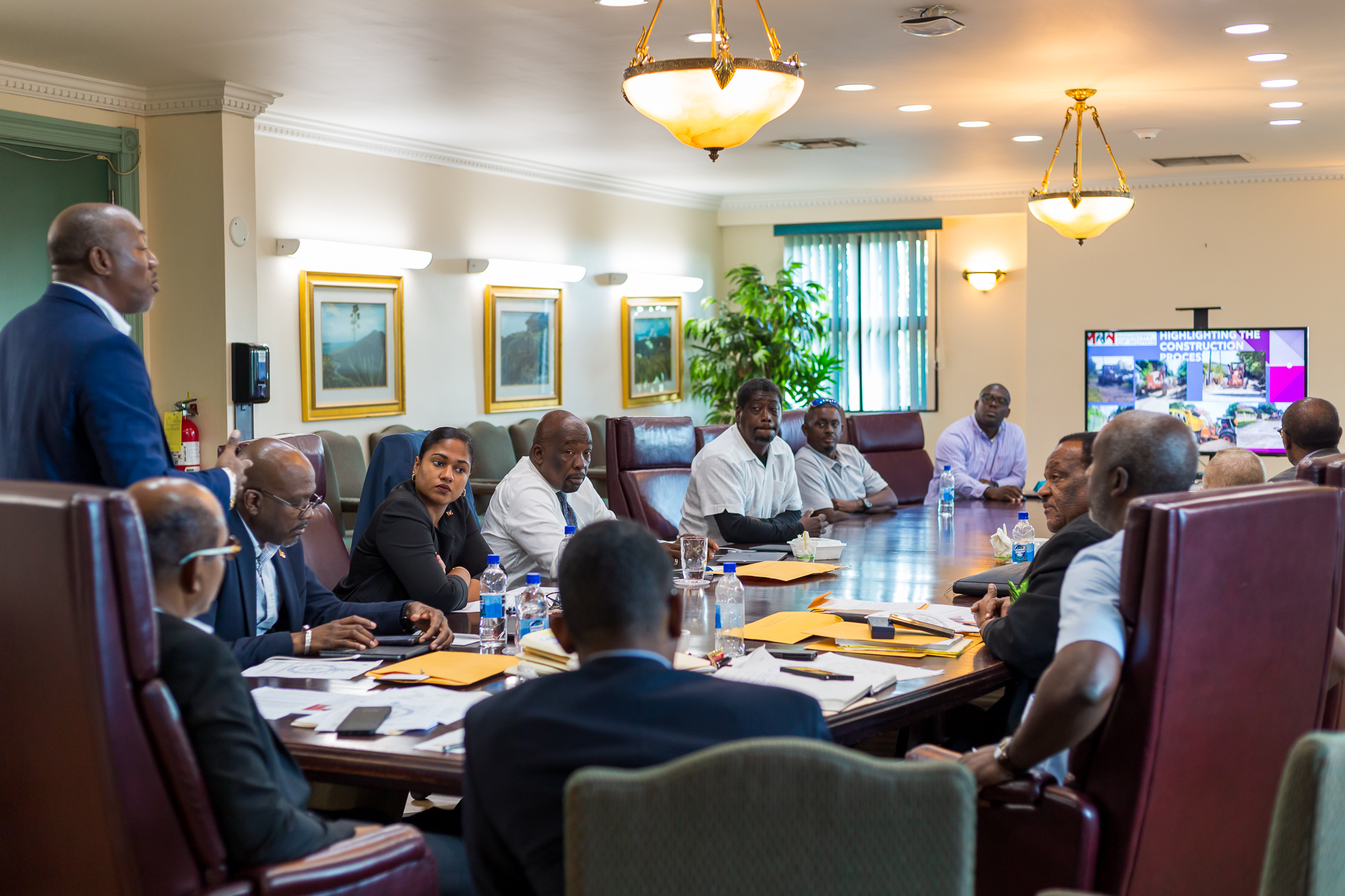
Cabinet in session

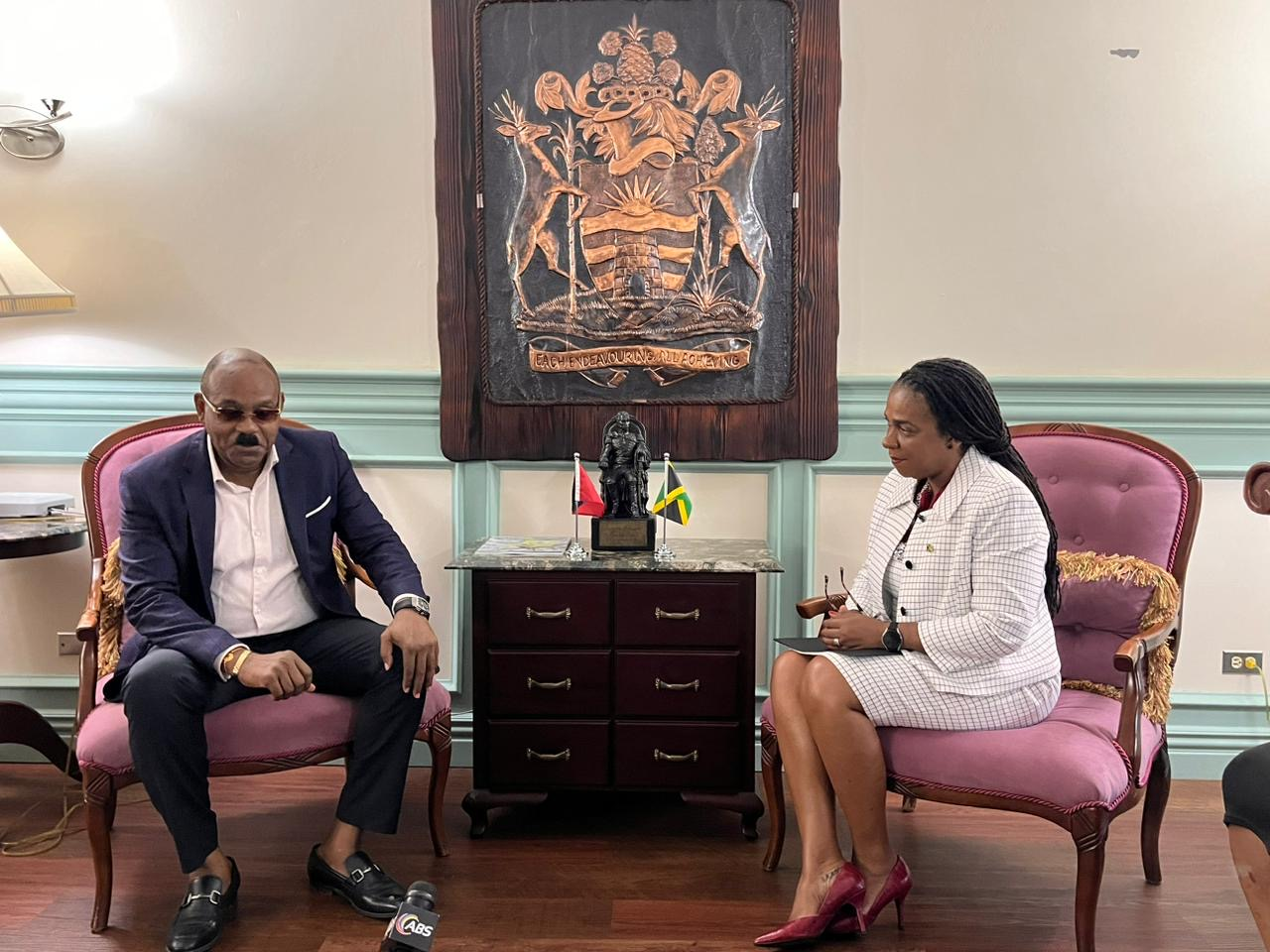
Courtesy call with the Jamaican ambassador

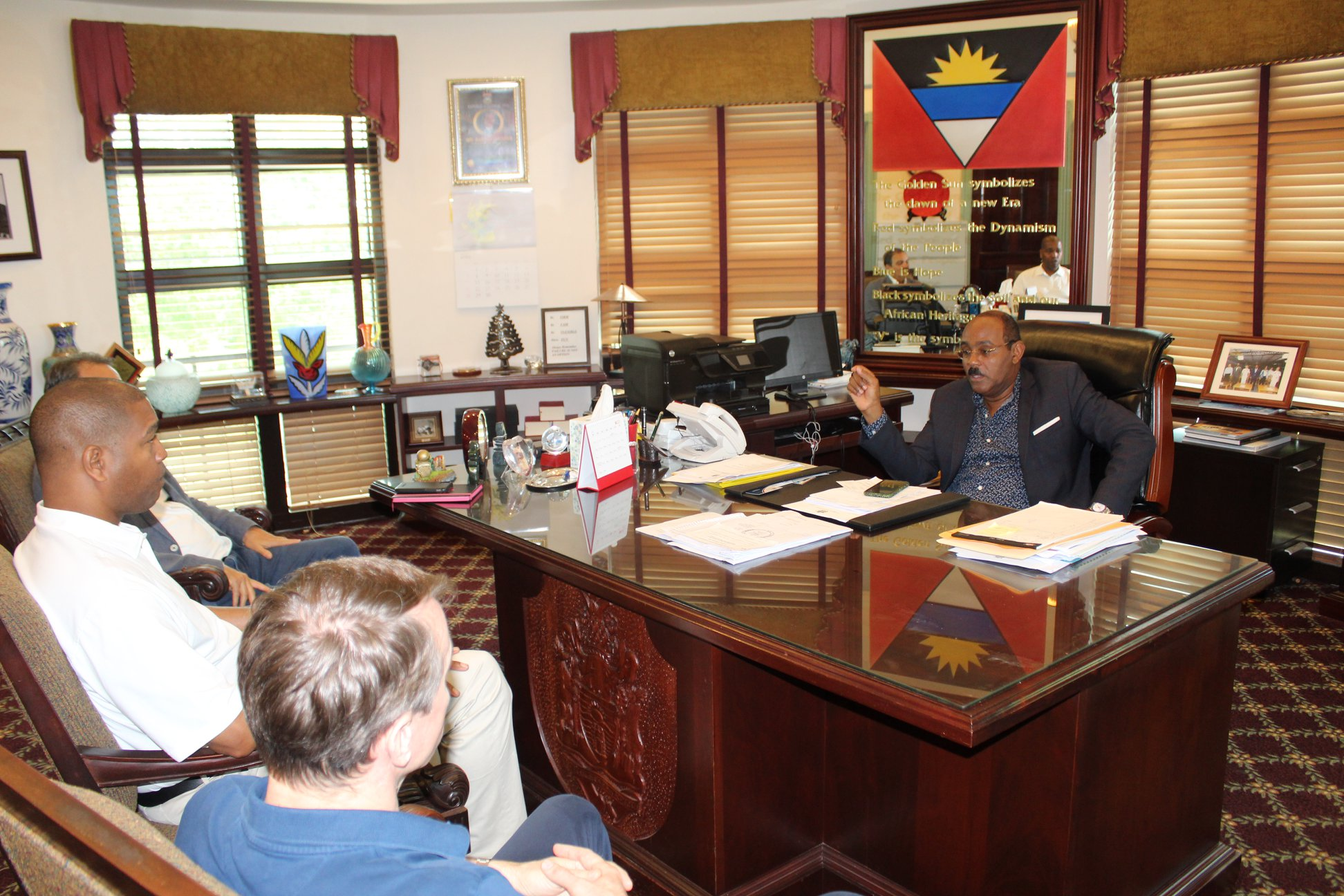
Prime minister's desk

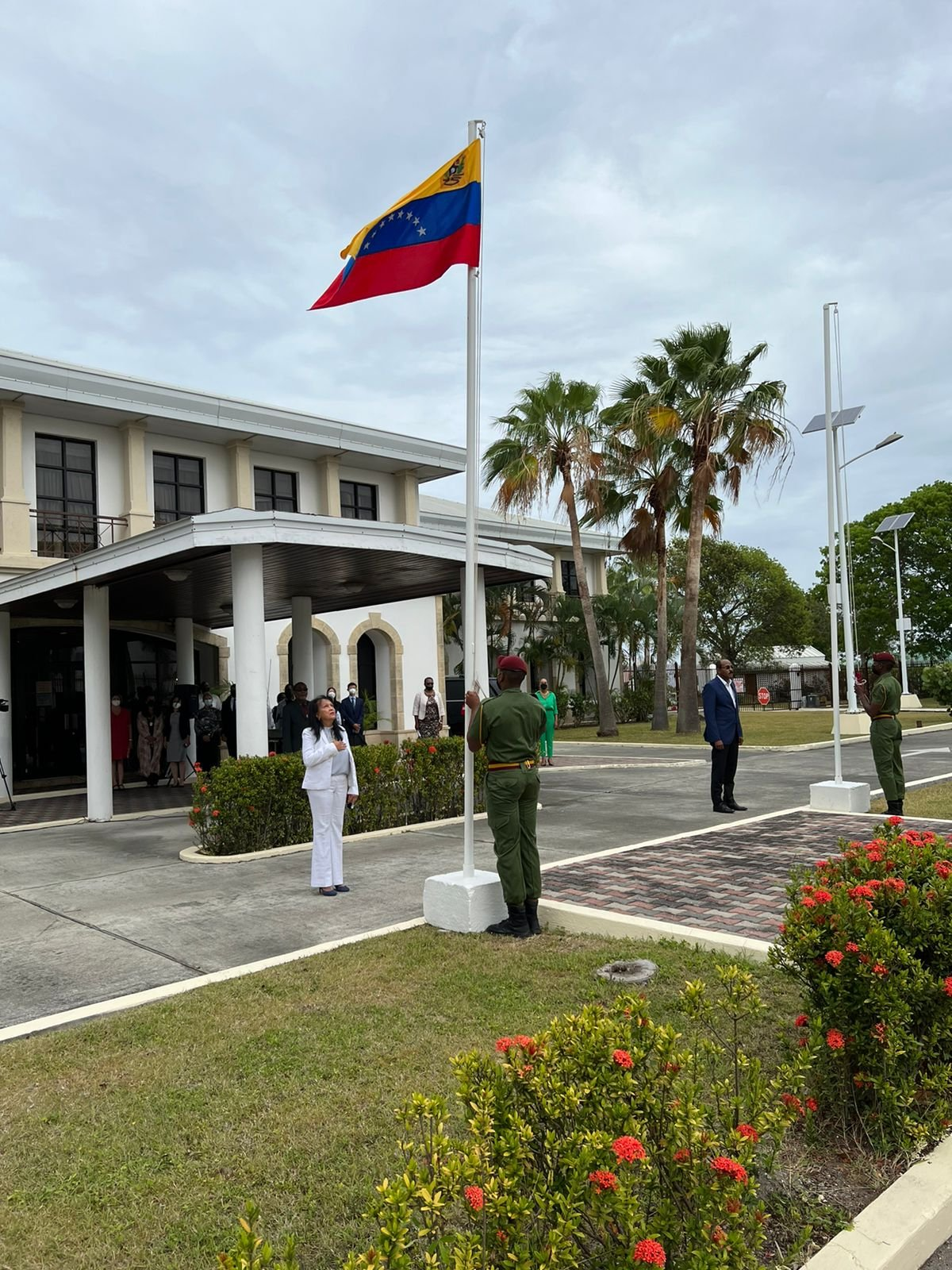
Flag of Venezuela being raised at a courtesy call

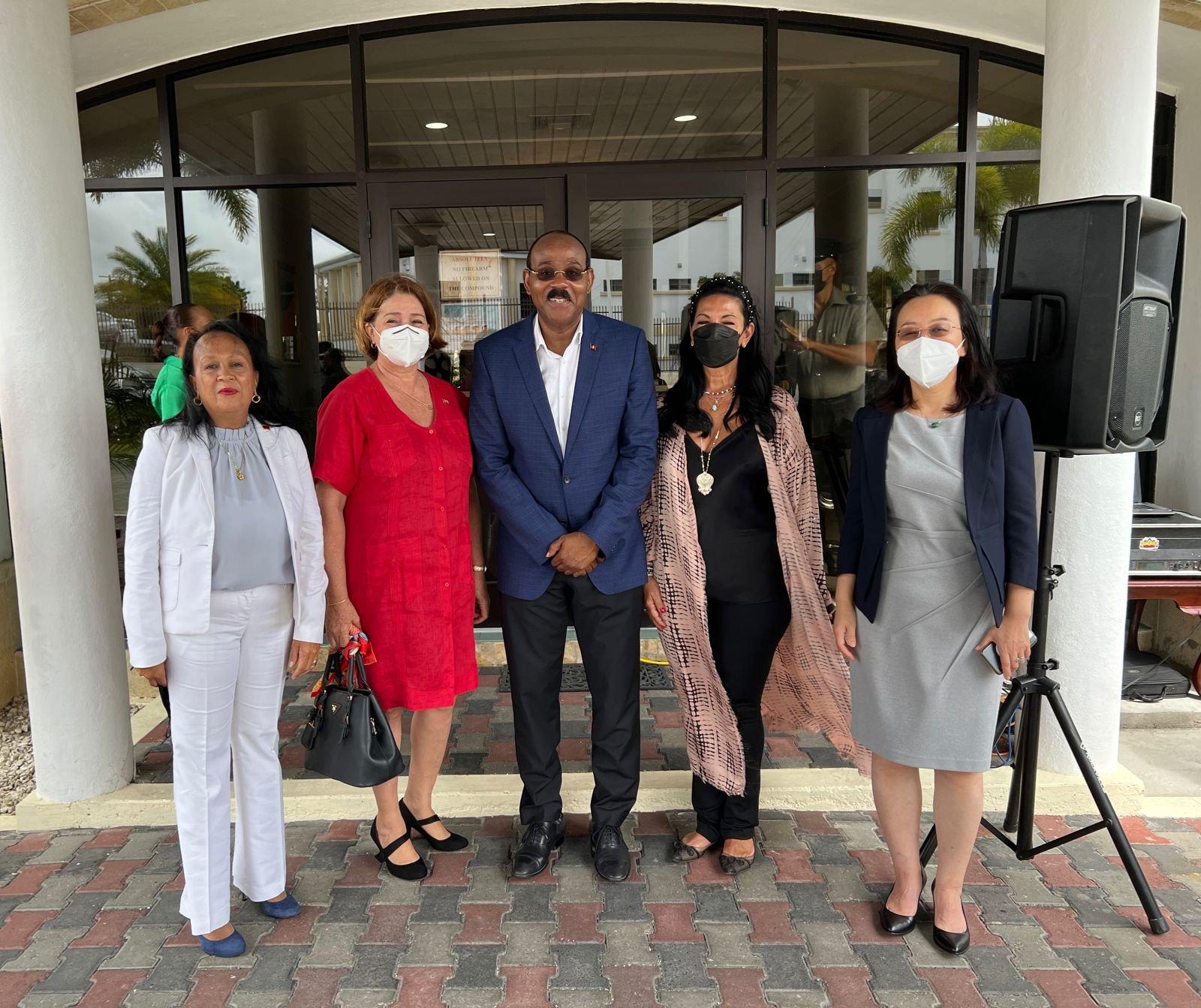
Venezuelan dignitaries pose at the entrance to the building

Entrance to the building
