= Ministry of Tourism, Civil Aviation, Transportation and Investment =

Tourism ministry

Agency overview
- Jurisdiction: Government of Antigua and Barbuda
- Agency executive: Charles Fernandez, Minister

The Ministry of Tourism, Civil Aviation, Transportation and Investment is a Cabinet-level governmental agency in Antigua and Barbuda responsible for investment and the country's tourism industry.

== Responsibilities ==
- Investment
- Meteorology
- Antigua and Barbuda Tourism Authority
- Overseas tourism offices
- Economic development
- Beach protection
- Vendors
- Vehicular control
- Dispatching facilities

=== Subordinate entities ===
- Antigua and Barbuda Airport Authority
- Antigua and Barbuda Investment Authority
- St. John's Development Corporation
- National Economic and Social Council
- Deep Bay Development Corporation
- New Port (Antigua) Limited
- Antigua Isle Limited
- Antigua Pier Group Ltd.
- Small Business Development Centre
- Antigua and Barbuda Hospitality Training Institute
- Transport Board

== See also ==
- Cabinet of Antigua and Barbuda
- Antigua and Barbuda Tourism Authority
