= Colo-i-Suva Forest Reserve =

Nature reserve in Fiji

- IUCN category II (national park)
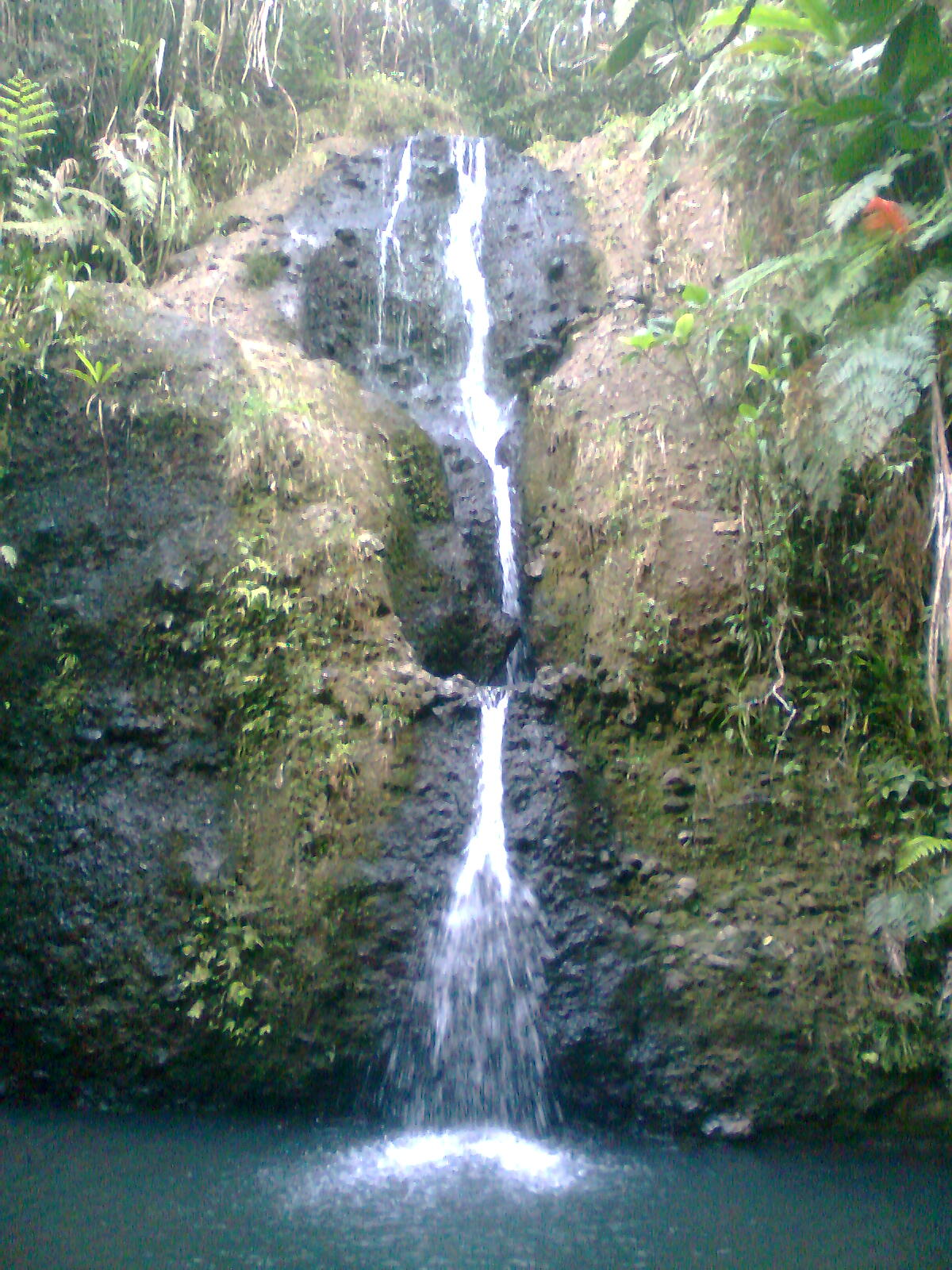
- The biggest waterfall in the park
- Interactive map of Colo-i-Suva Forest Reserve
- Location: Viti Levu, Fiji
- Nearest city: Suva
- Coordinates: 18°4′12″S 178°21′36″E
- Area: 4.97 km^{2} (1.92 sq mi)
- Established: 1952

Colo-I-Suva Forest Park is a nature reserve near Suva, Fiji. It offers hiking trails, swimming, and birdwatching. The forest is part of the Queen's Commonwealth Canopy.

== History ==
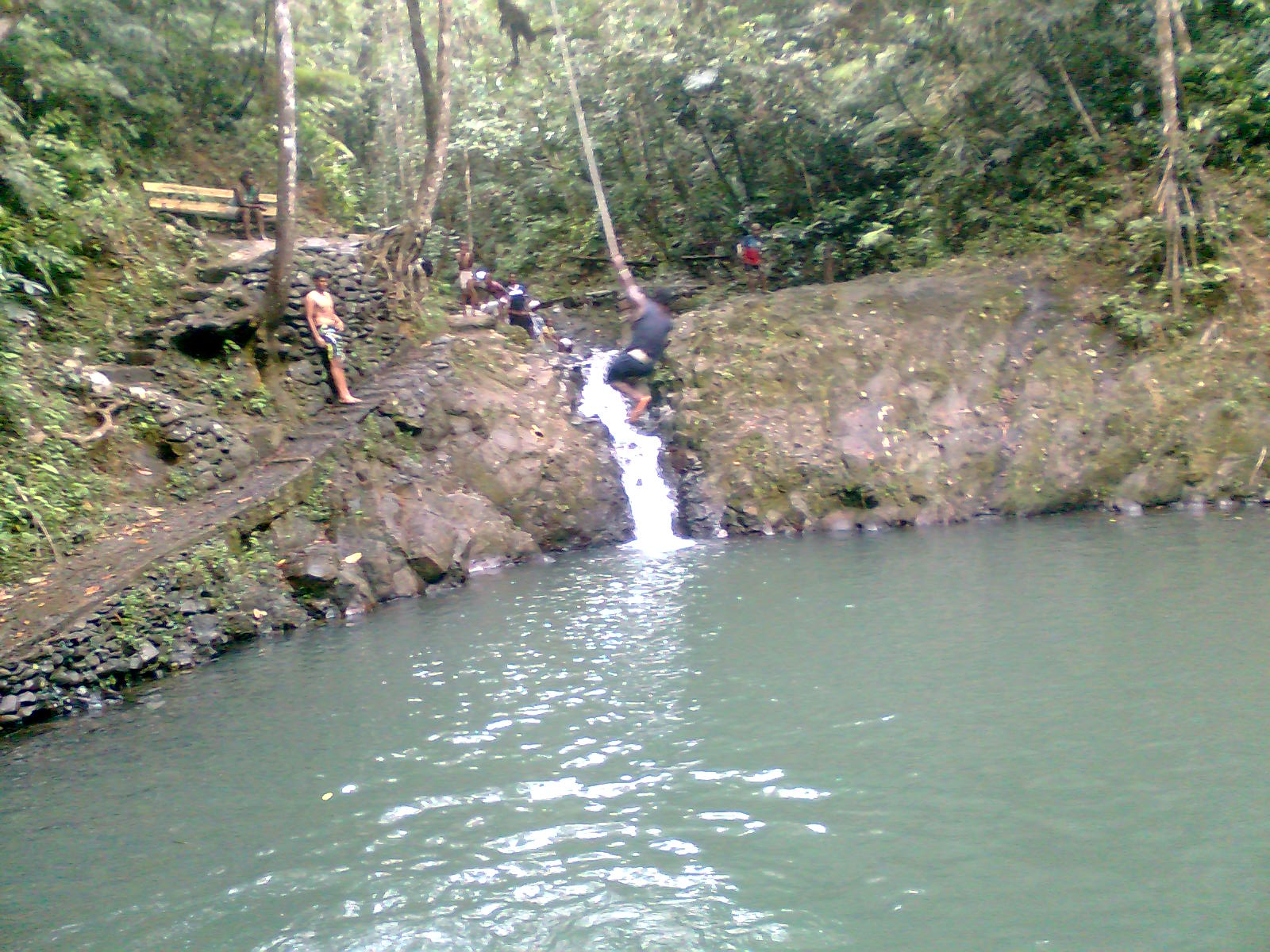
The rope-swing and swimming hole are the main reasons why some Suva residents visit the park.

Established in 1872, Colo-i-Suva Forest National Park in Fiji is a two and a half square kilometres of verdant rain-forests renowned for tropical flora and birds. There are about four and a half kilometres of natural trails ploughing through the forests and natural water bodies to swim in.

The Waisila Creek flows through the Colo-i-Suva Forest National Park in Fiji making its way to Waimanu River. It is the water catchment for Nausori and Nasinu creek.

African mahogany, planted in the 1940s and 1950s, stands apart from the older native vegetation.

On 24 October 2018, Prince Harry, Duke of Sussex, travelled to the forest and dedicated it to the Queen's Commonwealth Canopy.
