= History of Antigua and Barbuda (2014–present) =

Antigua and Barbuda
- 2014–present
Post-Bird era (2004–2014)
- Prime Minister: Gaston Browne

Gaston Browne was elected as the prime minister of Antigua and Barbuda in the 2014 Antiguan general election. Since then, the Barbudan independence movement has resurged and the Antigua and Barbuda Labour Party has cemented control over the country. Relations between the two islands have largely deteriorated as part of the Barbuda crisis.

== 2014–2018 ==
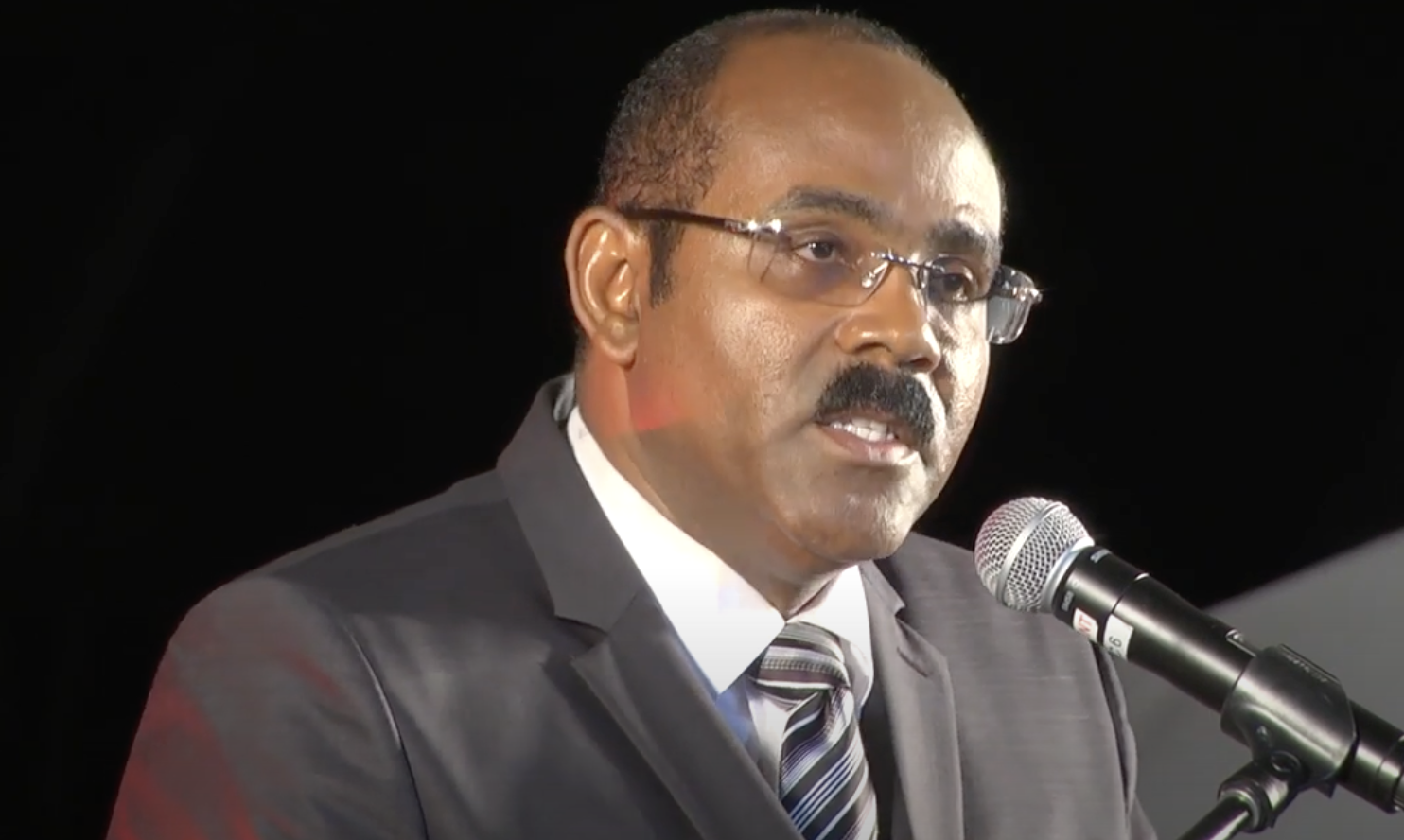
Gaston Browne at his inaugural address

General elections were held in Antigua and Barbuda on 12 June 2014. These elections resulted in the rebranded Labour Party returning to power after ten years in opposition. This also resulted in the Bird family's partial return to power, with Vere Bird's grandson-in-law Gaston Browne assuming the premiership. After the deterioration of the United Progressive Party's reputation, the Labour Party won in a landslide under new leadership, Browne being the youngest prime minister in the country's history. Browne pledged to transform the country into an economic powerhouse, with groundbreaking on his brainchild, the Antigua and Barbuda Special Economic Zone, commencing on 30 April 2015. The project was intended to be a modern futuristic city with skyscrapers and monorails, being led by the formerly-Chinese investor Yida Zhang, now exclusively a citizen of Antigua and Barbuda.

In 2016, Antigua's human and infrastructural development was deemed to be on an upward trajectory, being the first country in the Caribbean to ban plastic bags. However, this progress was reversed in September 2017 following Hurricane Irma.

While Antigua was largely unscathed, 95% of Barbuda's infrastructure was destroyed, causing a land grab and socioeconomic crisis that ended the once-positive relationship between the two islands. Attempting to exploit the situation on the island, general elections were called a year earlier than required.

== Since 2018 ==
On 21 March 2018, general elections were held. These elections resulted in an even larger landslide for the Labour Party, winning all but two seats in Parliament. However, after its loss of the Barbuda seat in 2014, the Barbuda People's Movement flipped the constituency, largely in part due to the government's handling of the hurricane just a few months before. Contrary to the constitution, Barbudans were not permitted to vote in their constituency due to a forced evacuation, an inciting moment in the resurgence of the Barbudan independence movement a few years later. While most aid intended for the island was withheld, Barbuda and the rest of the country began to slowly recover, and by February 2019, some residents had returned to the island. Voter records from 2023 show that the island had 1,281 registered electors, indicating a full recovery of the population, and possibly even a population increase.

In 2020, the COVID-19 pandemic reached Antigua and Barbuda, resulting in the collapse of the country's tourism industry. While the country eventually recovered, the already-inactive ABSEZ project collapsed, and Zhang began to enter legal troubles, effectively killing the project. In February 2024, the project was purchased by a local company, and the once nearly-completely autonomous zone was stripped of many of its local government powers.

Also in 2020, the Barbuda Council submitted a request to the Cabinet wishing for the island's independence, although a constitutional amendment declaring the island independent did not pass the House of Representatives. In 2023, general elections were held, resulting in the narrowest victory in the history of the country and no party winning a majority of the popular vote. Gaston Browne was sworn in for a third term on 20 January 2023. On 3 October 2024, the country's second international airport, Burton–Nibbs International Airport, was opened after ongoing controversy. The 2026 general election resulted in a landslide for the Labour Party.

On 14 May 2026, Spanish became the "official second language" of Antigua and Barbuda.
