= Mullaney =

Mullaney is a surname of Irish origin (from Connacht). It is an Anglicised form of the Gaelic Ó Maoil Sheanaigh meaning "descendant of Maoilsheanaigh". The Gaelic personal name Maoilsheanaigh means "devotee of (Saint) Seanach" and the personal name Seanach is made up of the element sean meaning "ancient", "old". Many spellings of Connacht named omit the Sh and in consequence one theory is that Mullaney may be an Anglicisation of Ó Maoileanaigh "descendant of Maoileanach". The personal name Maoileanach means "chief of the marsh". An Ulster family, unrelated to the Connacht family, bore the name Ó Maoileanaigh.

Notable people with the surname include:

- Beatrice Hancock Mullaney (died 1990), American jurist
- Craig Mullaney (born 1978), American veteran and author
- Dean Mullaney (born 1954), American editor
- Dominick F. Mullaney (1854–1929), American politician
- Jack Mullaney (1929–1982), American actor
- Jake Mullaney (born 1990), Australian footballer
- Jim Mullaney, American writer
- Joe Mullaney (basketball) (1924–2000), American basketball player
- John Mulaney (born 1982), American comedian
- Joe Mullaney (actor) (born 1962), Scottish actor
- Joe Mullaney (rugby league) (born c.1934), English rugby player
- Kerry Anne Mullaney (born 1975), Scottish film director
- Kevin Mullaney (born 1954), American darts player
- Mark Mullaney (born 1953), American football player
- Paul V. Mullaney (1919–2017), American judge
- Richard Mullaney (born 1993), American football player
- Ryan Mullaney (born 1996), Irish hurler
- Steven Mullaney (born 1986), English cricketer

== Fictional ==
- Lloyd Mullaney, character on Coronation Street

== See also ==
- Mullany
