= Government of Antigua and Barbuda =

- Constitutional monarchy
- Coat of arms of Antigua and Barbuda
- Formation: 1 November 1981
- Founding document: Constitution of Antigua and Barbuda
- Country: Antigua and Barbuda
- Website: https://ab.gov.ag

Legislative branch
- Legislature: Parliament
- Meeting place: Parliament Building

Executive branch
- Head of Government: Prime Minister
- Main body: Cabinet
- Headquarters: Office of the Prime Minister

Judicial branch
- Court: Eastern Caribbean Supreme Court

The Government of Antigua and Barbuda (GOAB), is a unitary constitutional monarchy, where the Monarch of Antigua and Barbuda serves as the head of state, represented by the Governor-General of Antigua and Barbuda, and the Prime Minister of Antigua and Barbuda serves as the head of government.

== Structure ==
Antigua and Barbuda has a bicameral legislature and multiple political parties, with universal adult suffrage and elections held every 5 years. The Senate has 17 members appointed by the Governor-General, with 10 being appointed on the advice of the Prime Minister, 4 on the advice of the Leader of the Opposition, one on the advice of the Barbuda Council, one resident of Barbuda on the advice of the Prime Minister, and one at the discretion of the Governor-General. The House of Representatives with 17 members are all elected.

The highest law in Antigua and Barbuda is the Constitution of Antigua and Barbuda. Officers of each house (President, Vice President; Speaker, Deputy Speaker) are all elected by members of those houses. The Cabinet is appointed by the Prime Minister, and members of the Cabinet must be either a member of the Senate or the House of Representatives. Elections are held every 5 years, however, elections may be called earlier by the Prime Minister.

== History ==
The government has been elected since 1984, which was the first election after independence in 1981. Before independence, the Antigua and Barbuda had previously been an associated state, and earlier a British colony. The first universal adult suffrage elections in Antigua and Barbuda were held in 1951.

The Antigua and Barbuda Labour Party has dominated the country since independence, except from 2004 to 2014, when the country was governed by the United Progressive Party.

== Executive branch ==
The constitution's section 68 establishes the executive branch of government, which is headed by the monarch. The Governor-General appoints the prime minister, who heads the executive branch. The prime minister must be a member of the House of Representatives and the leader of the political party that has the support of the majority of House members. Alternatively, if the Governor-General believes that a party does not have an unquestionable leader in the House or that no party commands the support of such a majority, he may designate as the member of the House who is most likely to command the support of the majority of House members. The candidate should also be willing to take on the role of prime minister.

Not all ministers hold cabinet positions, though historically and today the majority of ministers have held cabinet positions. Every member of the cabinet is a minister, save for the Attorney General. The Governor-General, acting on the Prime Minister's advice, may create additional offices of Minister (including Minister of State) within the Government in addition to the position of Prime Minister, subject to the provisions of any laws passed by Parliament. This is governed by subsection (4) of section 69 and section 82 of the Constitution.

Rather than serving in the cabinet, parliamentary secretaries assist the ministries. On the Prime Minister's recommendation, the Governor-General may designate members of the House and Senate to be Parliamentary Secretaries in order to support Ministers in their duties.

Permanent secretaries help ministries instead of sitting in the cabinet. A Minister is in charge of providing guidance and oversight to a specific government department after being assigned to it. The department is headed by a Permanent Secretary, a public official, who is subject to this direction and oversight. Any government department assigned to a minister may be supervised by two or more permanent secretaries for the purposes of section 78 of the constitution, as well as two or more government departments under the direction of one permanent secretary.

=== Ministers ===
Not every minister serves in the cabinet (the majority of ministers are also members of the cabinet, both currently and historically). With the exception of the Attorney General, every member of the cabinet is a minister. In addition to the office of Prime Minister, there can be such other offices of Minister (including Minister of State) of the Government as may be established by Parliament or, subject to the provisions of any law enacted by Parliament, by the Governor-General acting in accordance with the advice of the Prime Minister. This is subject to the provisions of section 82 of the Constitution and subsection (4) of section 69. The Governor-General, acting on the advice of the Prime Minister, must appoint from among the members of the House and of the Senate those individuals who will serve as Ministers other than the Prime Minister. If parliament is dissolved and a prime minister is required, a person who was a member of the House immediately before a dissolution may be appointed as Prime Minister or any other Minister, and a person who was a member of the Senate immediately before the dissolution may be appointed as any Minister other than Prime Minister. A document bearing the public seal must be used to make appointments.

By issuing written instructions, the Governor-General, acting in accordance with the Prime Minister's recommendation, may delegate to the Prime Minister or any other Minister responsibility for any government operation, including the management of any department. The Governor-General, acting in accordance with the advice of the Prime Minister, may appoint a member of the House or a Senator to act in the office of such Minister during such absence or illness when a Minister is unable to perform his or her duties because of his or her absence from Antigua and Barbuda or because of illness.

A minister other than the prime minister must resign from their position if they are appointed or reappointed as prime minister, stop serving as a member of the House of Parliament from among the members of which they were appointed, or if the Governor-General, acting on the advice of the prime minister, revokes their appointment. When a Minister other than the Prime Minister is compelled by section 31(2) or section 41 of the Constitution to stop serving in the House to which he belongs, he must also stop serving in any capacity as a Minister at that time.

Before beginning their official duties, the Prime Minister, each other Minister, and each Parliamentary Secretary must take and sign the oaths of office, allegiance, and confidentiality.

=== Parliamentary secretaries ===
Parliamentary secretaries support ministers rather than sit in the cabinet. To assist Ministers in carrying out their responsibilities, the Governor-General may choose members of the House and the Senate to serve as Parliamentary Secretaries, acting on the advice of the Prime Minister. A person who was a Senator or a member of the House immediately before the dissolution may be appointed as a Parliamentary Secretary if the need arises to make an appointment under this section while Parliament is suspended. When a member of the House of Representatives from which he was appointed ceases to be a member of the House of Representatives for any reason other than a dissolution of Parliament, when a person is appointed or reappointed as Prime Minister, or when the Governor-General orders it to be vacant on the advice of the Prime Minister.

=== Permanent secretaries ===
Rather than serving in the cabinet, permanent secretaries provide support for ministries. The minister is responsible for exercising direction and control over that department. Subject to this direction and control, the department is overseen by a Permanent Secretary, whose position is a public office. For the purposes of section 78 of the constitution, two or more government departments may be under the direction of one permanent secretary, and any department of government allocated to a minister may be under the direction of two or more permanent secretaries.

=== Cabinet ===
Cabinet consists of eleven ministries.

Ministry	Minister	Permanent secretary
Ministry of Finance, Corporate Governance and Public Private Partnerships	Gaston Browne	Edson Joseph, Suann Simon, Faustina Joseph
Ministry of Legal Affairs, Public Safety, Information and Labour	Steadroy Benjamin	Hildred Simpson, Janice Michael
Ministry of Health, Wellness, Environment and Civil Service Affairs	Michael Joseph	Stacey Gregg-Paige, Francia Sheppard
Ministry of Foreign Affairs, Trade and Immigration	Paul Chet Greene	Sharon Stevens, Colin O'Keiffe
Ministry of Agriculture, Lands and the Blue Economy	Anthony Smith	Walter Christopher, Sharolyn Mathews
Ministry of Tourism, Civil Aviation, Transportation and Investment	Charles Fernandez	Sean Cenac, Joan Joseph
Ministry of Information Communication Technologies, Utilities and Energy	Melford Nicholas	Olivette Williams
Ministry of Housing and Works	Maria Browne	Sandra Joseph
Ministry of Education, Science and Technology	Daryll Matthew	Ena Dalso Henry
Ministry of Social and Urban Transformation	Rawdon Turner	Rosa Greenaway, Sara E. Stuart
Ministry of Sports and Creative Industries	Dwayne George	Clarence Pilgrim

== Legislative branch ==
The Constitution's Section 27 creates the Parliament. As long as the laws follow the provisions of the Constitution, Parliament is empowered to pass legislation for Antigua and Barbuda's peace, order, and well-being. Any provision of the Constitution or the ruling of the Supreme Court may be amended by Parliament in compliance with section 47's requirements. At least two-thirds of House members must vote in favor of a bill in order for it to be deemed passed by the House, even if it amends the Constitution or a Supreme Court decision. The Senate, the House of Representatives, and the King of Antigua and Barbuda make up the Parliament of Antigua and Barbuda.

The Senate is Antigua and Barbuda's upper chamber of Parliament. The Governor General appoints its seventeen members. Ten members are appointed on the Prime Minister's recommendation, four on the Leader of the Opposition's recommendation, one on the Barbuda Council's recommendation, one on the Prime Minister's recommendation for a resident of Barbuda, and one at the Governor General's discretion.

The lower house of Antigua and Barbuda's bicameral parliament is called the House of Representatives. Subject to the provisions of the Constitution, each of the constituencies established in line with section 62 of the Constitution shall elect one representative to the House through a direct election, following the processes prescribed by or under any applicable law.

The 17th legislature of Antigua and Barbuda was elected on 30 April 2026.

== Judicial branch ==
The Antigua and Barbuda judiciary is a separate part of the government and is governed by the Antigua and Barbuda Constitution. The judicial branch is mostly independent of the other two institutions, despite the fact that magistrates are appointed by the Office of the Attorney General in the executive branch. The judiciary is made up of the High Court for significant offenses and the Magistrate's Court for minor ones.
