= History of Antigua and Barbuda (1981–1994) =

Post-independence era
- 1981–1994
Associated State of Antigua (1967–1981)	Late Bird era (1994–2004)
- Prime Minister: V. C. Bird

The history of Antigua and Barbuda from 1981 to 1994 began after Antigua and Barbuda gained independence from the United Kingdom on 1 November 1981. This era cemented the rule of the Bird family in Antigua, and resulted in the Barbudan independence movement being pacified for the next few decades. The Antigua Labour Party also became a conservative party during this period, resulting in tense relations with leftist governments and Antigua and Barbuda's participation in the United States invasion of Grenada.

== 1981–1989 ==
After associated statehood was terminated on 1 November 1981, a new unitary constitution went into effect, causing much unrest. On 3 November 1981, the chairperson of the Barbuda Council led a protest, seeking Barbuda's separation from the new country. In 1983, Antigua became involved in its first military conflict, sending about a dozen troops to join the invasion of Grenada. On 17 April 1984, the country held its first elections after independence, resulting in V. C. Bird being reelected as prime minister. The election was a landslide for the Labour Party, with the only opposition member elected being Eric Burton from Barbuda. However, these elections were slightly controversial due to the constituency of All Saints being abolished, which was previously held by popular opposition member George Walter. The government was accused of gerrymandering political boundaries. After this election, the veteran figures of the opposition both left politics, and new politicians like future prime minister Baldwin Spencer emerged. The ruling Bird family was also accused of authoritarianism, and there was a political power struggle between Vere Bird Jr. and Lester Bird. By 1986, the United National Democratic Party was established. Bird Jr. was primarily supported by the military, while Lester had the support of most of the civilian population. However, due to a political scandal in 1987 relating to airport funds, Lester Bird began to emerge as the favorite to succeed Bird Sr. as prime minister. Conflict also emerged between the Barbuda Council and the central government, and due to Lester Bird being deemed too leftist to work with western powers, international support began to pour in for both the UNDP and the council. The Labour Party won the 1989 elections with relative ease.

== 1989–1994 ==
After the 1989 elections, the new country continued to sink into corruption, and by 1992 with the establishment of the United Progressive Party, the Bird regime began to face its first legitimate challenge to power. With the discovery of V. C. Bird diverting public funds to a private account, a general strike was announced, and Bird announced he would not seek another term in March 1994. The Guns for Antigua scandal in 1990 also further tarnished the country's reputation. In 1993, most government funding was allocated to education, finance, and health.
