= Minister of Foreign Affairs, Trade and Immigration =

This is a list of foreign ministers of Antigua and Barbuda.

- 1981–1991: Lester Bird
- 1991: Vere Bird
- 1991–2004: Lester Bird
- 2004–2005: Harold Lovell
- 2005–2014: Baldwin Spencer
- 2014–2018: Charles Fernandez
- 2018–present: Paul Chet Greene

== Sources ==
- Rulers.org – Foreign ministers A–D
