= Ministry of Social and Urban Transformation =

Government agency in Antigua and Barbuda

Agency overview
- Formed: 15 January 2024
- Jurisdiction: Government of Antigua and Barbuda
- Agency executive: Rawdon Turner, Minister

The Ministry of Social and Urban Transformation is a Cabinet-level governmental agency in Antigua and Barbuda responsible for community development, social welfare, and urban renewal.

== Responsibilities ==
- Urban renewal
- Community development
- Social improvement
- Probation
- Social policy and development
- Single parents
- Substance abuse
- Poverty
- Elderly
- Disaster preparedness
- Rural development
- Vendors
- Religion

== See also ==
- Cabinet of Antigua and Barbuda
- Demographics of Antigua and Barbuda
