= Ministry of Housing and Works (Antigua and Barbuda) =

Works ministry

Agency overview
- Jurisdiction: Government of Antigua and Barbuda
- Agency executive: Maria Browne, Minister

The Ministry of Housing and Works is a Cabinet-level governmental agency in Antigua and Barbuda responsible for infrastructure and housing.

== Responsibilities ==
- Housing
- Headquarters
- Public works
- Procurement
- Stores
- Infrastructure
- Maintenance
- Quarries
- Road works

=== Subordinate entities ===
- Government Workshop
- Central Housing and Planning Authority (CHAPA)
- National Housing Development and Urban Renewal Co. Ltd.
- National Mortgage and Trust Limited

== See also ==
- Cabinet of Antigua and Barbuda
