= Ministry of Sports and Creative Industries =

Government agency in Antigua and Barbuda

Agency overview
- Jurisdiction: Government of Antigua and Barbuda
- Agency executive: Dwayne George, Minister

The Ministry of Sports and Creative Industries is a Cabinet-level governmental agency in Antigua and Barbuda responsible for sports, culture, and art.

== Responsibilities ==
- Ministry headquarters
- Sports
- Stadiums
- Festivals
  - Antigua Carnival
  - Independence Day Parade
  - One Nation Concert
- Holidays
- Art
  - Performing arts

== See also ==
- Cabinet of Antigua and Barbuda
