= History of Antigua and Barbuda (1994–2004) =

Late Bird era
- 1994–2004
Post-independence era (1981–1994)	Post-Bird era (2004–2014)
- Prime Minister(s): Lester Bird

The history of Antigua and Barbuda from 1994 until 2004 began with the undemocratic elections that installed Lester Bird into power, after V. C. Bird was forced out of office due to various corruption scandals and advanced age. This era was associated with severe democratic backsliding, until 2001 when the Antigua and Barbuda Electoral Commission was established and the eventual fall of the Bird regime following the democratic 2004 general election. Antigua and Barbuda was not considered a democracy during this period.

== 1994–1999 ==
General elections were held on 8 March 1994. These elections were neither free nor fair, with an extremely inaccurate voter registry and a lack of important voter protections. The police were used to intimidate voters into supporting the Labour Party, and there was no right to a secret ballot. However, the newly founded United Progressive Party won five seats, and the Barbuda People's Movement gained the Barbuda seat. After a tense relationship with the Barbudans, the Labour Party attempted to reenter Barbudan politics to no avail. The party also lost support in the parish of Saint John. When Bird took office, the tourism industry began to slow, and the country began to accumulate external debt. In early 1995 the government adopted a structural adjustment plan, cutting funding to education, health, and basic infrastructure. The public sector was shrunken, although it continued to employ 40% of the labour force. The country's infrastructure deteriorated throughout this era, quality of life dropped rapidly, and by this time, over forty percent of homes did not have a toilet. In late 1995, Hurricane Luis passed over the country, with three deaths, hundreds of injuries, and 350 million dollars in damages. About half of the country's homes were destroyed. Aid supposed to be used to rebuild the country was diverted, and one million dollars to be used for construction materials granted by Asot Michael went missing.

By the late 1990s, the government's reputation deteriorated. The offshore banking industry was accused of being linked with Russian organised crime, and the country was accused of not properly regulating its banking industry. In 1998, Antigua and Barbuda was one of only four other countries in the Americas not considered an electoral democracy by Freedom House.

== 1999-2004 ==
On 9 March 1999, one of the most consequential elections in the history of the country was held. They were neither free nor fair according to the Commonwealth Observer Group. A hunger strike was held, and on 3 December 2001 the independent Antigua and Barbuda Electoral Commission was established. The state-controlled media was also liberalised in the early 2000s, and after Antigua and Barbuda briefly being one of the most developed countries in the eastern Caribbean, quality of life once again fell, and the country began to suffer the consequences of corruption and external debt. A Caribbean integration movement also emerged in Barbuda, although it was overshadowed by the autonomist Barbuda People's Movement led by Trevor Walker.
