= Ministry of Agriculture, Lands and the Blue Economy =

Agriculture ministry

Agency overview
- Jurisdiction: Government of Antigua and Barbuda
- Agency executive: Anthony Smith, Minister

The Ministry of Agriculture, Lands and the Blue Economy is a Cabinet-level governmental agency in Antigua and Barbuda responsible for agriculture and land management.

== Responsibilities ==
- Agriculture Development Corporation
- Fisheries
- Antigua Fisheries Ltd.
- Food production
- Animal husbandry
- Veterinary services
- Agricultural Extension Services
- Central Marketing Corporation
- Chemistry and Food Technology Division
- Marine resources
- Agricultural industries
- Surveys
- Survey Office
- Development Control Authority
- Lands
- Blue economy

== See also ==
- Cabinet of Antigua and Barbuda
