= Ministry of Information Communication Technologies, Utilities and Energy =

Public utilities ministry

Agency overview
- Jurisdiction: Government of Antigua and Barbuda
- Agency executive: Melford Nicholas, Minister

The Ministry of Information Communication Technologies, Utilities and Energy is a Cabinet-level governmental agency in Antigua and Barbuda responsible for the internet and public utilities.

== Responsibilities ==
- Information
- Broadcasting
- Telecommunications
- Antigua Public Utilities Authority
- Energy
- Antigua and Barbuda National Energy Council
- PDV Caribe Antigua and Barbuda Ltd.
- ICT Centres
- Information technology
- E-government
- Digitisation

== See also ==
- Cabinet of Antigua and Barbuda
