= Ministry of Education, Science and Technology (Antigua and Barbuda) =

Education ministry

Agency overview
- Jurisdiction: Government of Antigua and Barbuda
- Agency executive: Daryll Matthew, Minister

The Ministry of Education, Science and Technology is a Cabinet-level governmental agency in Antigua and Barbuda responsible for education and sciences.

== Responsibilities ==
- General education
- Training
- Museums
- Technical development
- Science and technology
- School Uniforms Programme
- School Meals Programme
- Sports
- Community sports facilities
- Culture
- Antigua Carnival
- Independence Day
- One Nation Concert
- V.C. Bird Day
- UNOPS
- Art

=== Subordinate entities ===
- Antigua Public Library
- National Archives
- National Accreditation Board
- National Training Agency
- Board of Education
- National Commission on Education
- University of the West Indies at Five Islands
- Antigua State College
- Antigua Recreation Ground
- Sir Vivian Richards Stadium
- Cedar Valley Golf Club
- Antigua and Barbuda Institute of Continuing Education
- Antigua and Barbuda International Institute of Technology
- Boys Training School

== See also ==
- Cabinet of Antigua and Barbuda
