= Antigua honeymoon murders =

2008 double murder in Antigua

The Antigua honeymoon murders refer to the murder of Ben Mullany, (1977–2008), and Catherine Mullany, (1977–2008), two British newlywed health professionals (a student physiotherapist and a doctor) who were murdered during their honeymoon in Antigua. Their murders sparked a diplomatic row between Antigua and the United Kingdom and resulted in sweeping legislative reform in Antigua.

== Background ==
Ben Mullany, who was from Ystalyfera, Wales, was training to become a physiotherapist and was in his third year at the University of the West of England (UWE) in Bristol, England. Catherine Mullany, who had grown up a few miles away from her future husband, was a paediatrician training to be a general practitioner. On 12 July 2008, Ben and Catherine married at St John the Evangelist Church in Cilybebyll, Wales. Two days after the marriage, the couple checked into Antigua's Cocos Hotel on 14 July 2008.

The night before they were to return to the United Kingdom, only two weeks after their wedding, the couple were fatally shot in their cottage during what was thought to be a robbery attempt. Catherine was shot in the head and died instantly. Ben suffered a gunshot wound to the neck. Though he was able to signal and murmur to the paramedics, on the way to the hospital he lapsed into a coma. Ben's parents, who flew to Antigua with Catherine's parents, decided to fly him back to Britain via air ambulance in a last-ditch attempt to save his life. Ben was taken to Morriston Hospital in Swansea, Wales, where his murdered wife, Catherine, had worked.

On 3 August 2008, exactly one week after his wife died, following brain stem testing, Ben Mullany died. His life support machines were turned off after doctors told his parents that there was no chance of recovery. The couple were buried together in Cilybebyll. Their funeral was held at Llandaff Cathedral in Cardiff, Wales on 10 September 2008. Around 900 people attended including Sarah, Duchess of York.

In July 2011, Kaniel Martin and Avie Howell were found guilty of their murders, as well as that of a shopkeeper, Woneta Anderson and have been given three consecutive life sentences escaping the death penalty. Howell was shot dead by police in June 2014 after escaping from jail. Through the University of the West Indies (UWI) Seeds of Hope Prison Education Programme, Martin graduated at the top of its class in 2022 with a degree in entrepreneurship.

== Effects ==
=== Sweeping legislative reforms in Antigua ===
Antigua Prime Minister Baldwin Spencer, in an attempt to save the island's tourism, is implementing measures in order to increase Antigua's police power including stop and search powers for the police, systematic searches of pockets "within various communities" for guns and drugs, new surveillance cameras and wire-tapping. Spencer has indicated that he is in the process of introducing legislative actions that will make the actions legal and permanent.

Additional changes have been made regarding the death penalty, gun trafficking, and assaults with a weapon. "Antigua's government will introduce the death penalty for crimes involving weapons in the wake of the murders of a British honeymoon couple. The new sentencing legislation will be for anyone who uses a gun or knife in a crime which results in death or serious injury." The new law also imposes a requirement for judges to hand down a minimum sentence of 25 years in prison and enables judges to ask for a life sentence if need be in cases involving assault with a weapon. Under current law, the death penalty is applied only in murder cases. This legislation will apply it to any crime involving a knife/gun and to gun trafficking. In addition, the previous law required that there be a maximum sentence of 25 years in prison for assault with a weapon.

=== Pending diplomatic row ===
The British government faces a diplomatic row with Antigua over the shooting of the honeymoon couple after demanding that anyone convicted of the crime will not face the death penalty. The British demand to its former colony is understood to have vexed Antigua's leadership as Western interference in Antigua's police and justice systems is a highly contentious issue in the country. In 2000, the two countries clashed diplomatically after a similar crime in which the United Kingdom tried to stop the execution of Steadroy McDougal for the murder of another British couple. McDougal was eventually reprieved in August 2002.

Prime Minister Spencer has also blamed Britain and the United States for the escalating violence in his country, saying that over 280 criminals had been deported to Antigua over the last decade, many of whom had few local ties. "To any small island developing state, this figure is astronomically high. In ours, with its small population, these criminal deportees, with skills developed and nurtured in the US and the UK, are impacting tremendously on our society." These remarks have generated great controversy.

=== The Mullany Fund ===
On 5 September 2008, the family and friends of Ben and Cath Mullany launched a memorial fund that will raise money to support British students wishing to study medicine or physiotherapy. The Duchess of York is patron of the charity which is also supported by Sir Vivian Richards.

== See also ==
- Murder of Chantel Crumps
