= Antigua and Barbuda Parliament Building =

Parliament Building
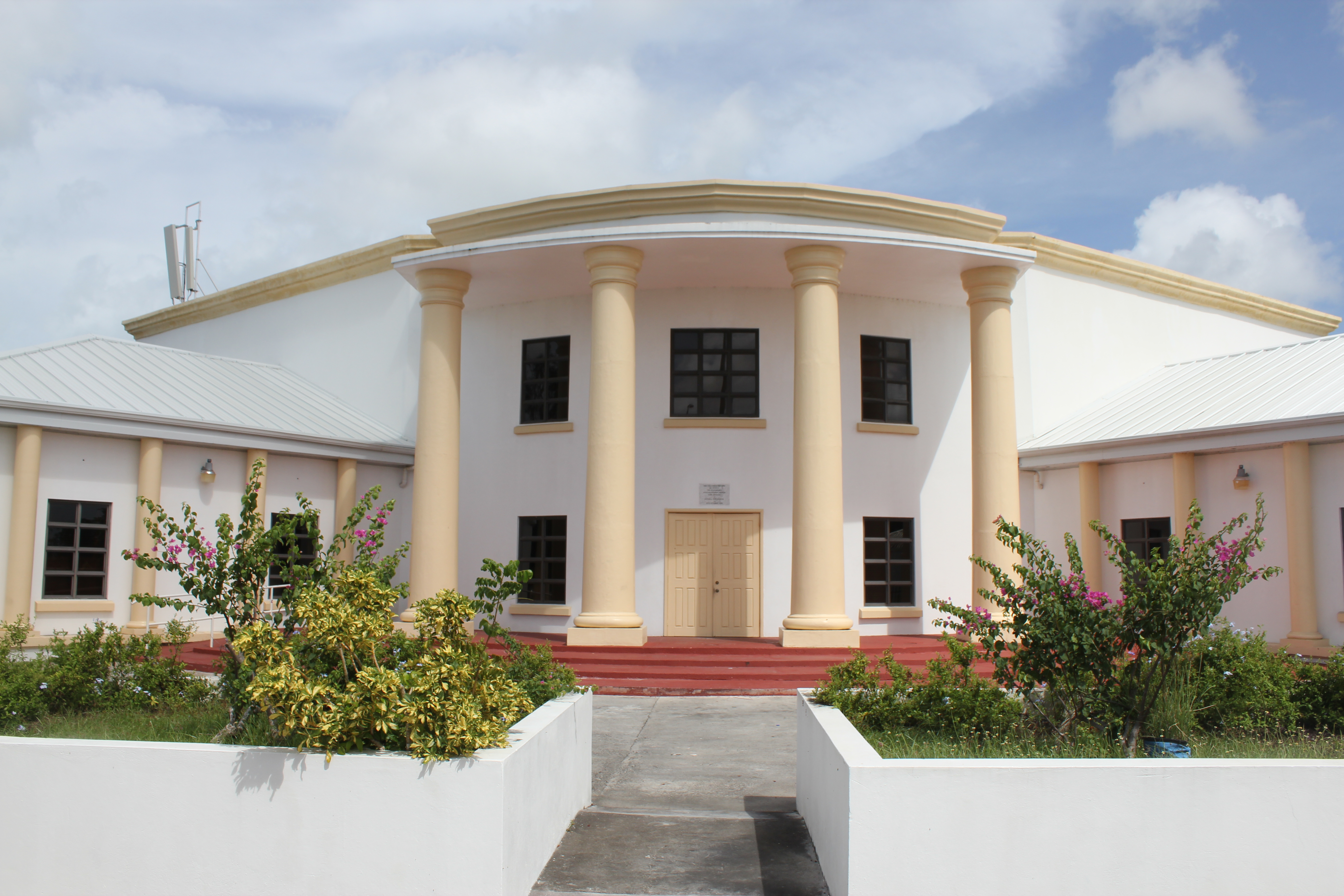

General information
- Location: Queen Elizabeth Highway, St. John's, Antigua and Barbuda, Antigua and Barbuda
- Coordinates: 17°7′6″N 61°49′59″W
- Inaugurated: 30 October 2006; 20 years ago

The Antigua and Barbuda Parliament Building is a two-storey structure that is the seat of the Parliament of Antigua and Barbuda. The building is located in the Government Complex, adjacent to the Office of the Prime Minister.

== History and function ==
The building was inaugurated on 30 October 2006. The previous building was located on the nearby Parliament Drive. When the building is not hosting sittings of Parliament, other events may be held in its rotunda. When a throne speech is held, the governor-general is welcomed by an honour guard of soldiers from the Antigua and Barbuda Defence Force at the building's south portico.

== Architecture ==
In addition to the central portion that includes the rotunda, the building contains four small wings. The roof of the rotunda is a small cone-shaped dome, with the remainder of the roofing being either flat or metal-roofed. Like other buildings in the complex, it is painted white. There are two parking lots, and a small guard booth. A large sign in arial font reading "Parliament of Antigua & Barbuda" is located nearby.
