= Ministry of Health, Wellness, Environment and Civil Service Affairs =

Ministry in Antigua and Barbuda

Agency overview
- Jurisdiction: Antigua and Barbuda Government of Antigua and Barbuda
- Headquarters: High Street, Saint John's, Antigua and Barbuda
- Minister responsible: Michael Joseph
- Parent agency: Government of Antigua and Barbuda
- Website: https://health.gov.ag

The Ministry of Health, Wellness, Environment and Civil Service Affairs is responsible for the Sir Lester Bird Mount St. John's Medical Centre, Antigua and Barbuda Hospital Board, Medical Benefits Scheme, Central Board of Health, AIDS Secretariat, and the National Solid Waste Management Authority.

== Disaster management ==
The Health Disaster Management Unit was established after Hurricane Irma in 2017. Its main responsibility is making sure that the Ministry of Health is prepared for any natural disaster.

== Medical division ==
The Medical Division is responsible for providing free ambulatory services for the citizens of Antigua and Barbuda, and the division comprises 5 main medical officers.

Location of District Medical Officers
| Monday | Tuesday | Wednesday | Thursday | Friday |
|---|---|---|---|---|
| Newfield; Jennings; Liberta | Parham; Bolands; All Saints; Cedar Grove; Bishopgate Street; Brown's Avenue; Judges Hill | Parham; Bendals; Swetes; Grays Farm; Five Islands | Parham; Newfield; Johnsons Point; Liberta; Cedar Grove; Bishopgate Street; Potters Village; Piggotts | Freetown; Bethesda; Swetes; Potters Village |

== Healthcare ==
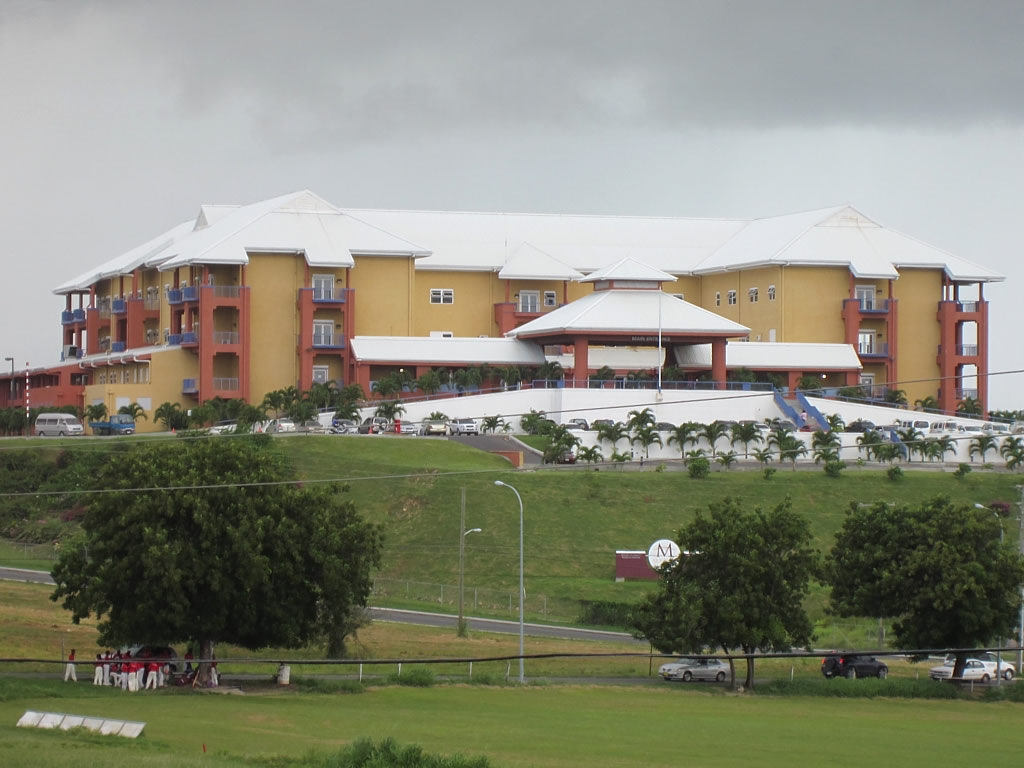
Mount St. John's Medical Center (2011)

The Mount St. John's Medical Center in St. John's opened in 2009. It has 185 beds and is managed by the Ministry. St. John's Medical Center also has an eight bed extension unit on Barbuda. There are over 25 health clinics on Antigua.

== Nutrition unit ==
The Antigua and Barbuda Nutrition Unit was established in 2002 by the first Chief Nutrition Officer, Juanita James. The unit is responsible for:

- Develops and monitors nutrition related policies
- Provides education and counseling about nutrition to the public
- Provides leadership and coordinates the Infant and Young Child Feeding Programme.
- Promotes healthy lifestyles to the people of Antigua and Barbuda.
- Conducts research and surveys related to nutrition.
- Monitors the nutritional status of the people of Antigua and Barbuda.

Legislation related to the unit includes the Tobacco Control Act 2018.
