= Charles Fernandez (politician) =

Antiguan politician

The Honourable Charles “Max” Fernandez
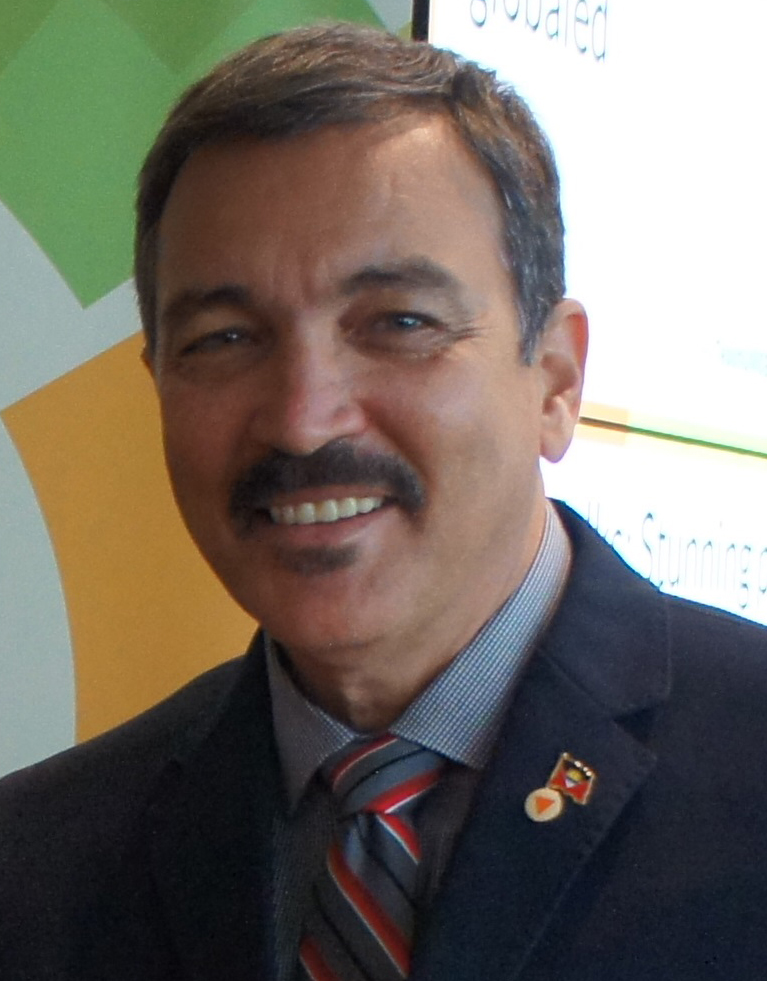

Minister of Tourism, Investment and Economic Development
- Incumbent
- Assumed office 2017
- Preceded by: Asot Michael

Minister of Foreign Affairs
- In office 18 June 2014 – 2018
- Preceded by: Baldwin Spencer
- Succeeded by: Paul Chet Greene

Personal details
- Born: Charles Henry Fernandez; 24 December 1954 (age 71)
- Party: Labour
- Spouse: Jill
- Children: 3
- Education: University of the West Indies

Charles Henry “Max” Fernandez (born 24 December 1954) is a Labour Party politician from Antigua and Barbuda who was the Minister of Foreign Affairs and International Trade from June 2014 to 2018. He currently serves as Minister of Tourism, Investment and Economic Development.

== Early life and education ==
Charles “Max” Henry Fernandez grew up in St. John’s, and attended St. Joseph’s Academy. He completed a Business Management Degree at the University of the West Indies.

== Career ==
He joined the Labour Party in 1984, and in 1995 Prime Minister Lester Bird appointed him to the Senate, where he served until 2004. During his time in the Senate, he was also the Chairman of the Board of The Free Trade and the Chairman of the Board of The Medical Benefits Scheme.

Fernandez was elected to the House of Representatives in the 2009 Elections for the St. John's Rural North Constituency, where he presently resides with his wife Jill and three sons.

He was the Minister of Foreign Affairs and International Trade from June 2014 to 2018.

Fernandez was elected again to the House of Representatives in the 2023 general elections for the St. John’s Rural North Constituency and confirmed as Minister of Tourism, Investment and Economic Development in the Government of the Prime Minister Gaston Browne.

== See also ==
- List of foreign ministers in 2017
- Gaston Browne
- E.P. Chet Greene

Political offices
Preceded by Baldwin Spencer	Foreign Minister of Antigua and Barbuda; June 2014–2018	Succeeded by Paul Chet Greene
