= Dutch colonial architecture =

Style of architecture across the Dutch Empire

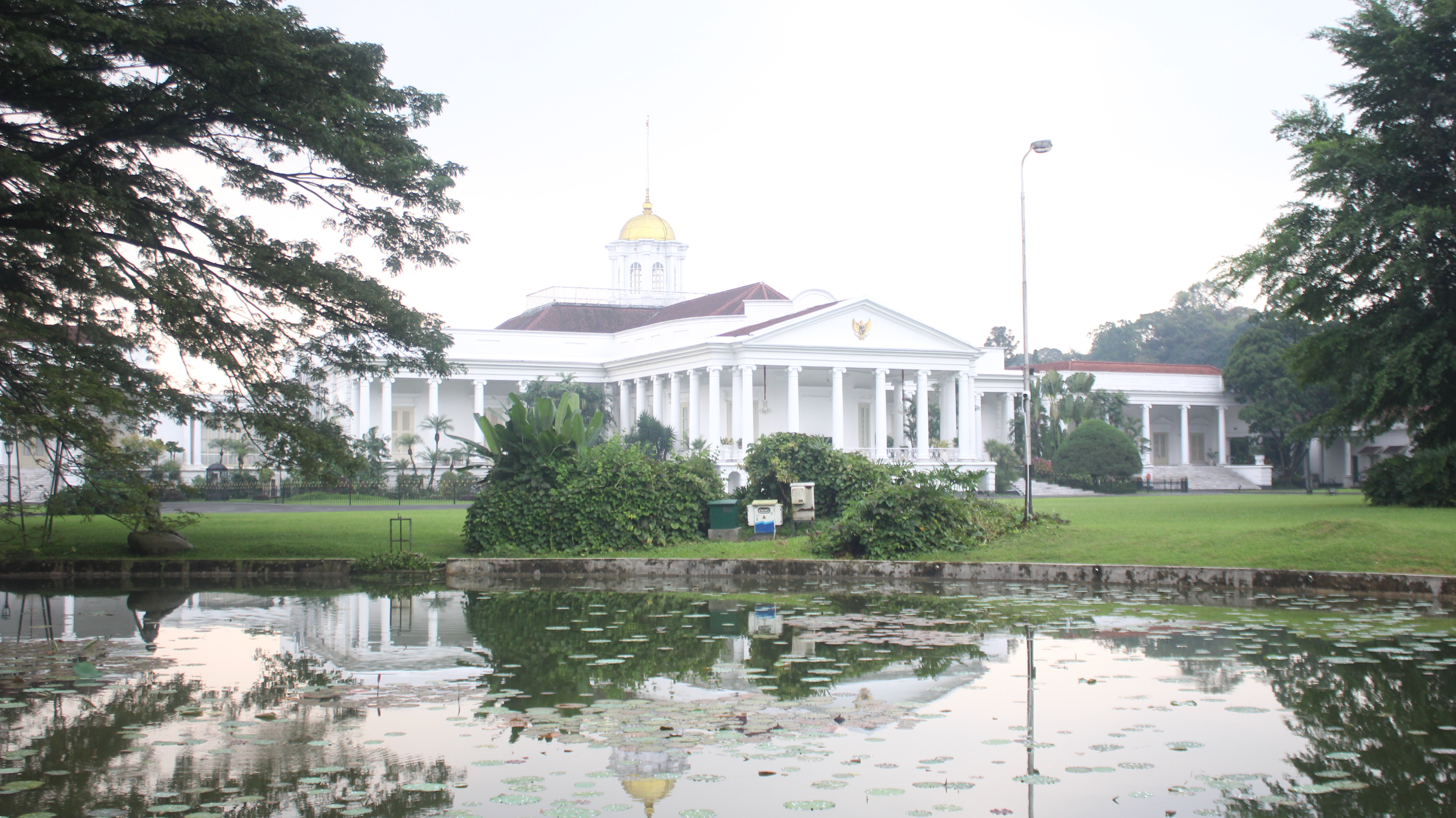
Bogor Palace, in Bogor, was built in 1744 as a residence of the Dutch Governor-General.

Dutch colonial architecture refers to the various style of Dutch architecture built across the Dutch Empire. Though most of the buildings were designed by Dutch architects and dictated by Western architectural styles, even the most ardent style-purists among architects could not escape the forces of context and culture. Dutch colonial architecture often is a result of climatological adaptations or the use of local building materials - and more importantly, the rich and diverse cultural contexts. In this hybridity lies the quality of these buildings. Architecture shows that the strict racial taxonomy of a colonial system could not be maintained.

Dutch colonial architecture is most visible in Indonesia (especially Java and Sumatra), the United States, Suriname, the Dutch Caribbean, South Asia, and South Africa. In Indonesia, formerly Dutch East Indies, colonial architecture was studied academically and had developed into a new tropical architecture form which emphasizes on conforming to the tropical climate of the Indies and not completely imitating the architectural language of the Dutch colonists.

== In Indonesia ==
Dutch colonial architecture in Indonesia were built across the archipelago that once was known as Dutch East Indies. Dutch colonial architecture in Indonesia is a unique cultural phenomenon. It is a mixture of Dutch colonial and Indonesian culture. It does not exist elsewhere, even in the other former colonized countries. The uniqueness of these buildings can be seen in their colonial relics. As a result, there are large number of colonial buildings concentrated in its cities. Plenty of old VOC era forts and warehouses are also scattered throughout the archipelago, particularly around Maluku Islands and Sulawesi. There are three Dutch colonial architectural styles: Old Indies Style, Indies Empire style, and New Indies Style.

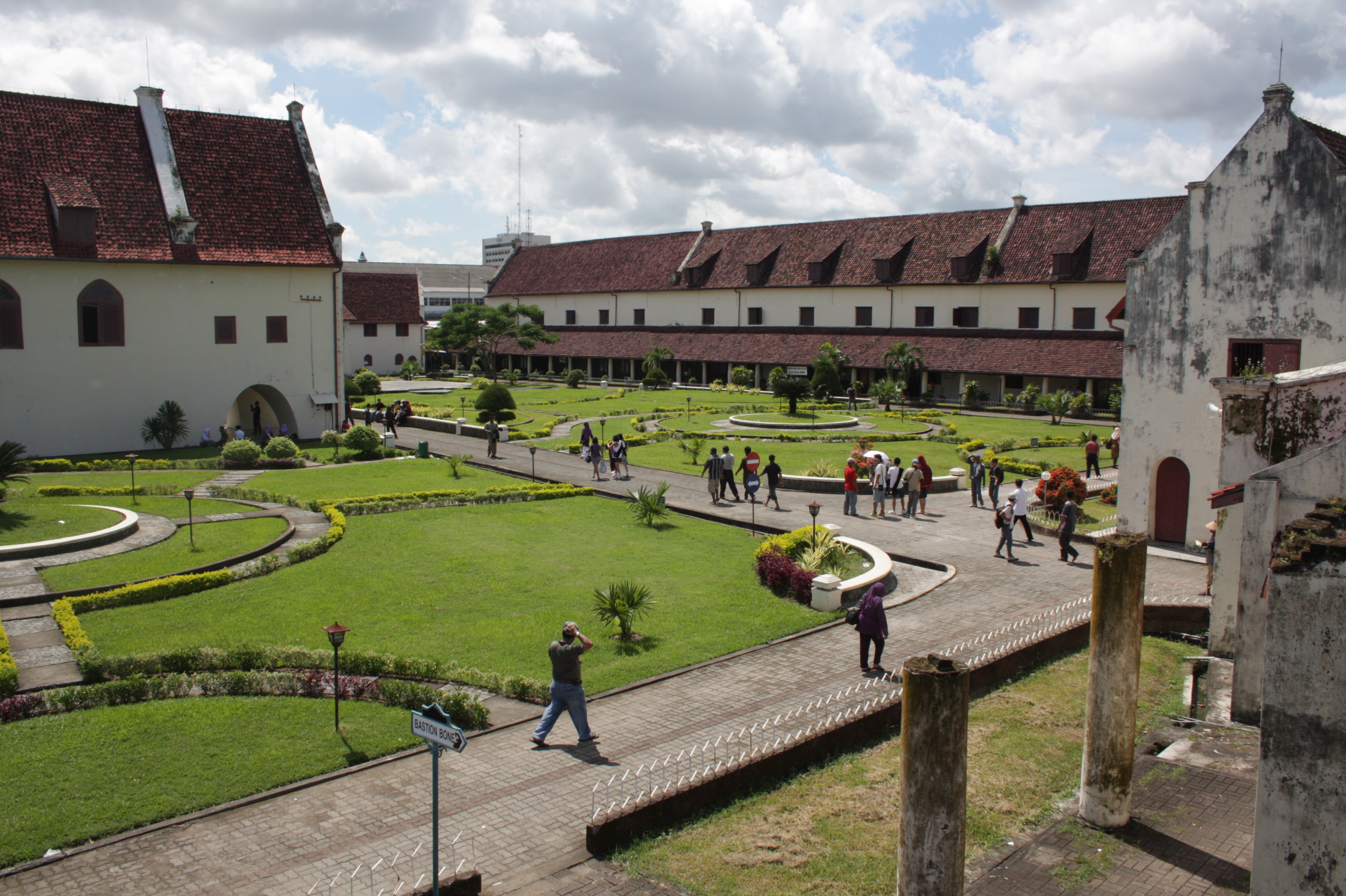
Fort Rotterdam in Makassar, built in 1673

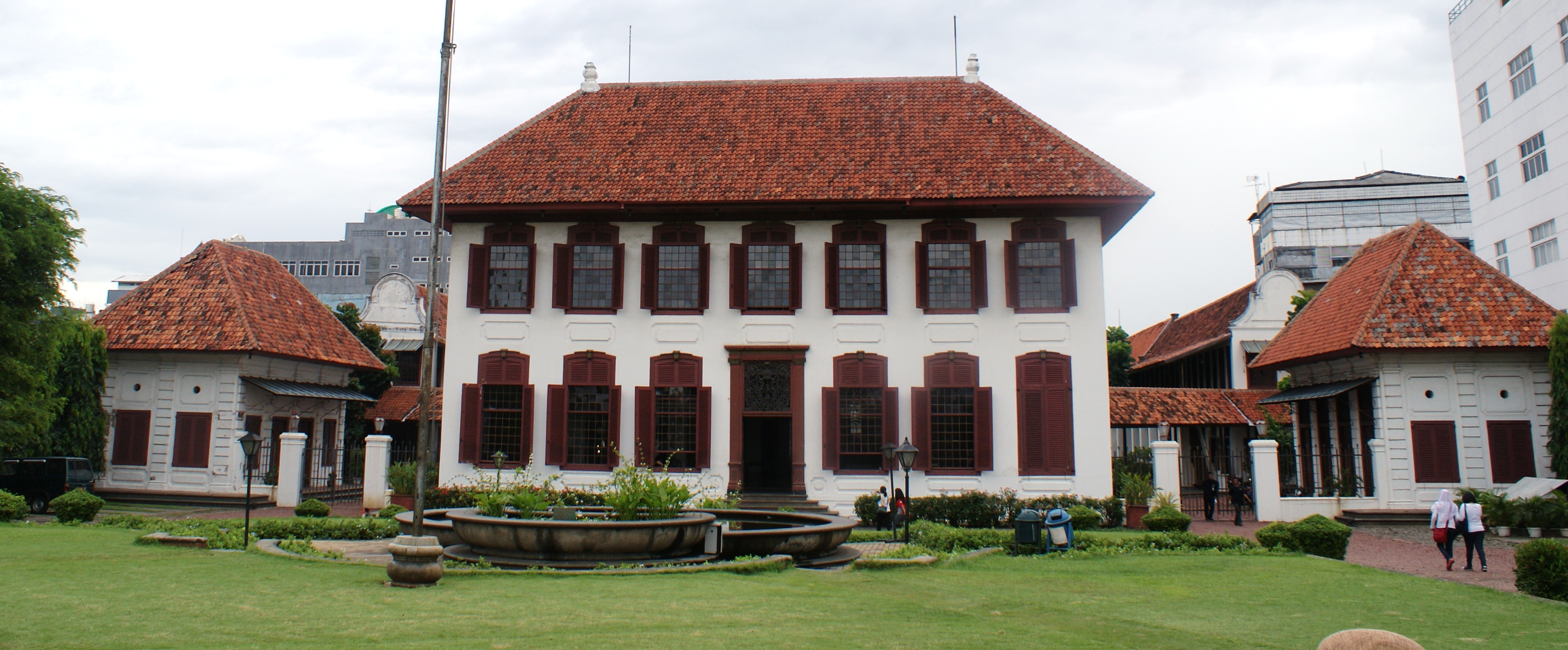
National Archives of Indonesia

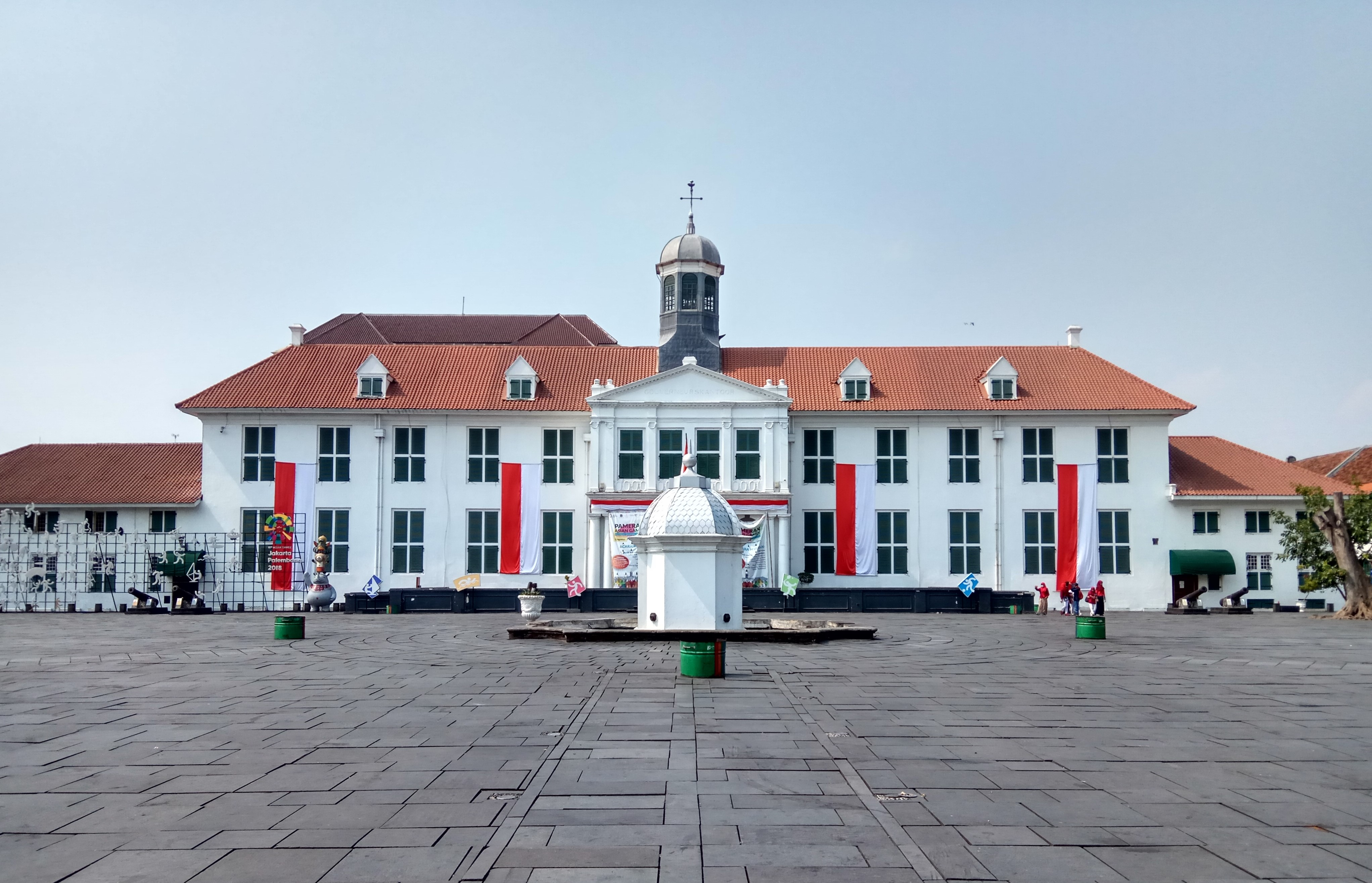
Jakarta History Museum, formerly Stadhuis van Batavia

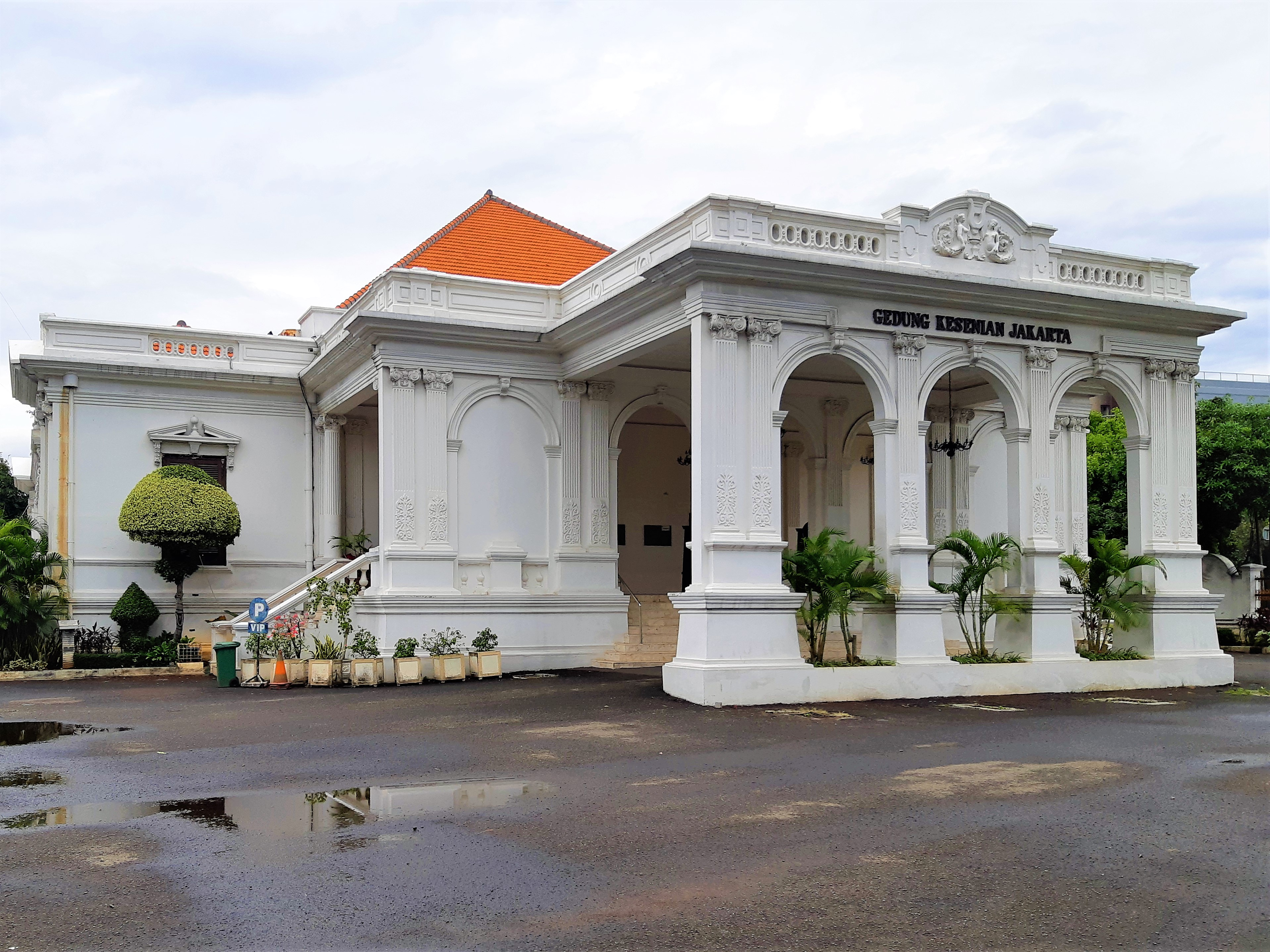
Jakarta Art Building

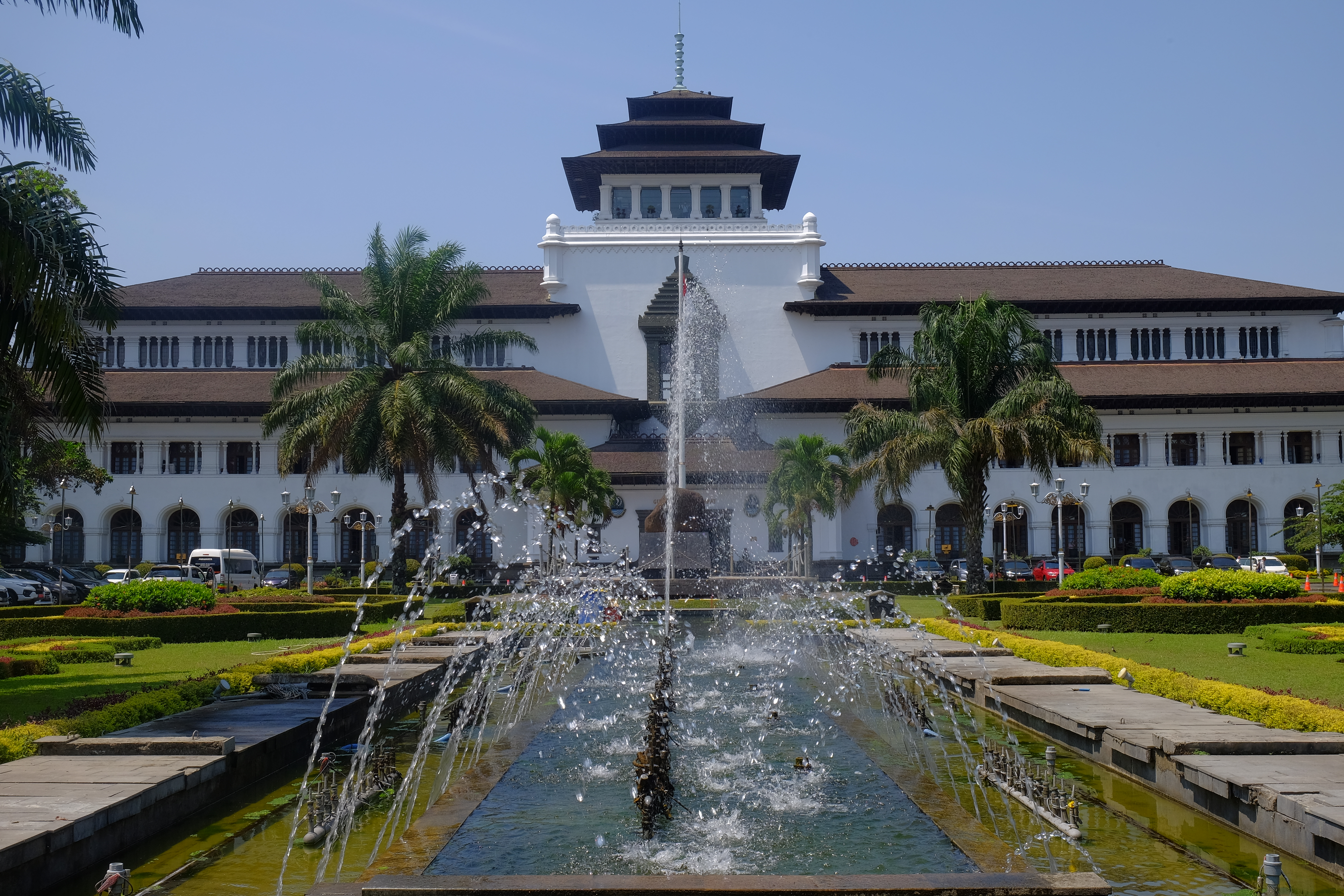
Gedung Sate, Bandung

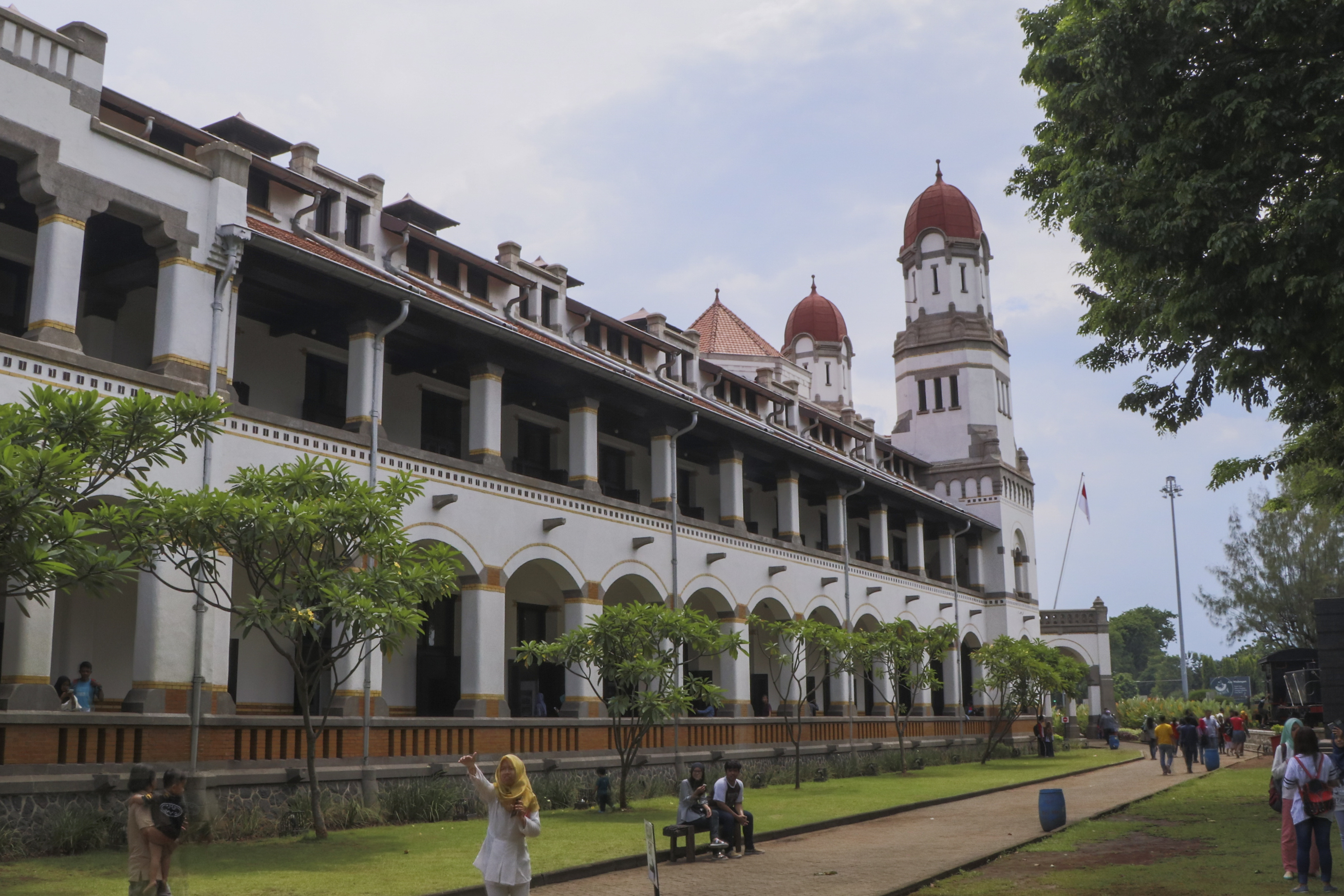
Lawang Sewu, Semarang

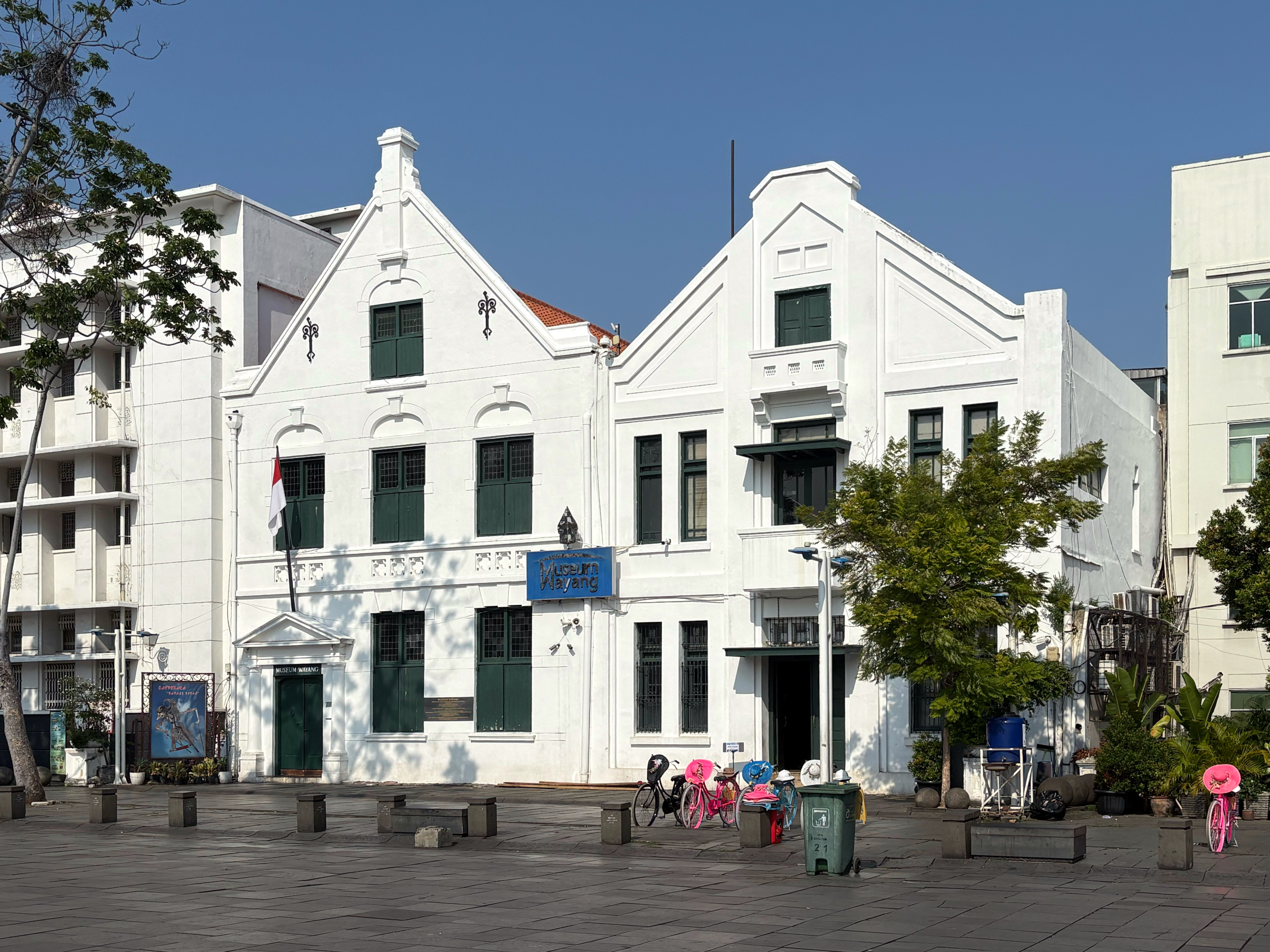
Wayang Museum

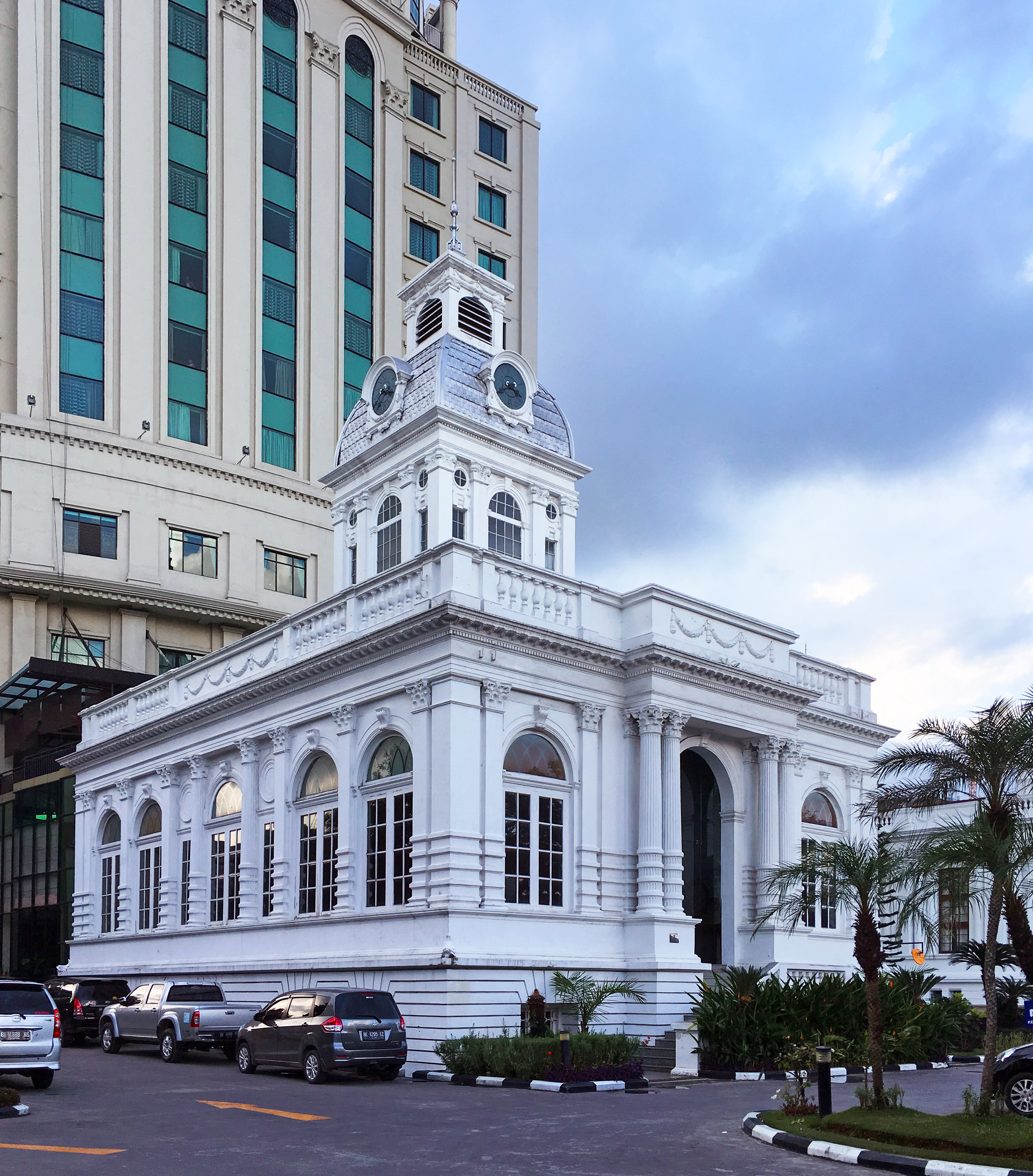
Medan Old City Hall

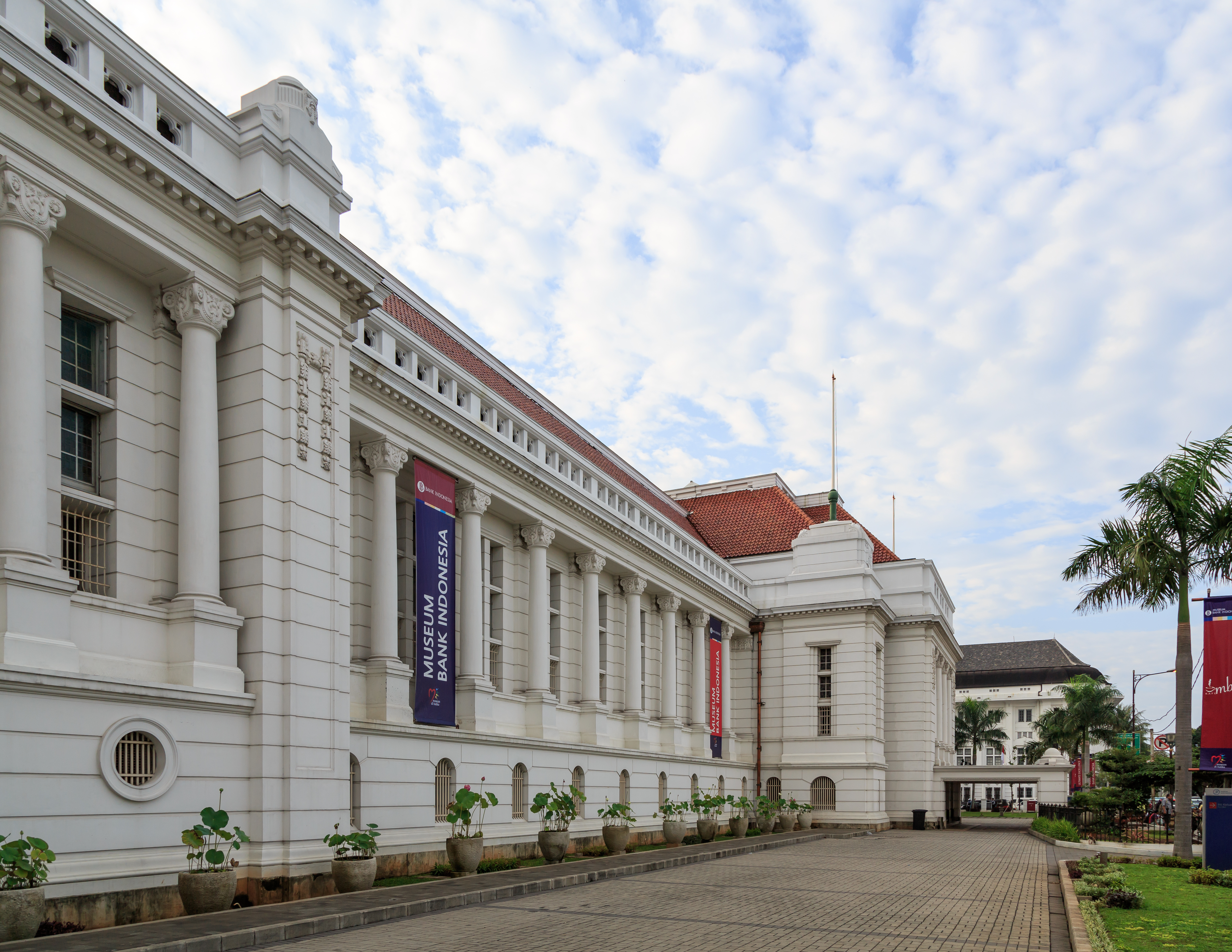
De Javasche Bank, now Bank Indonesia

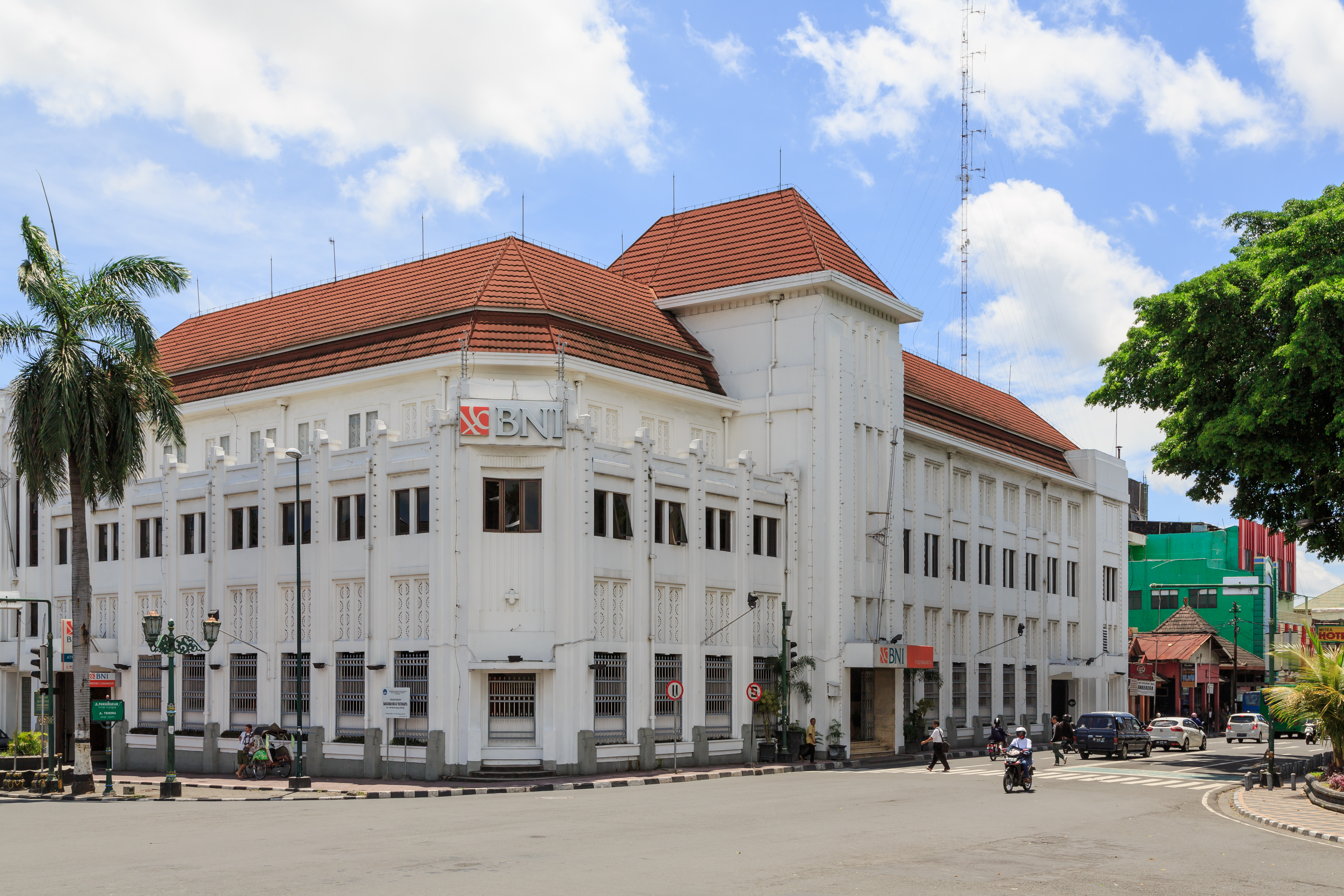
Bank Negara Indonesia, Yogyakarta

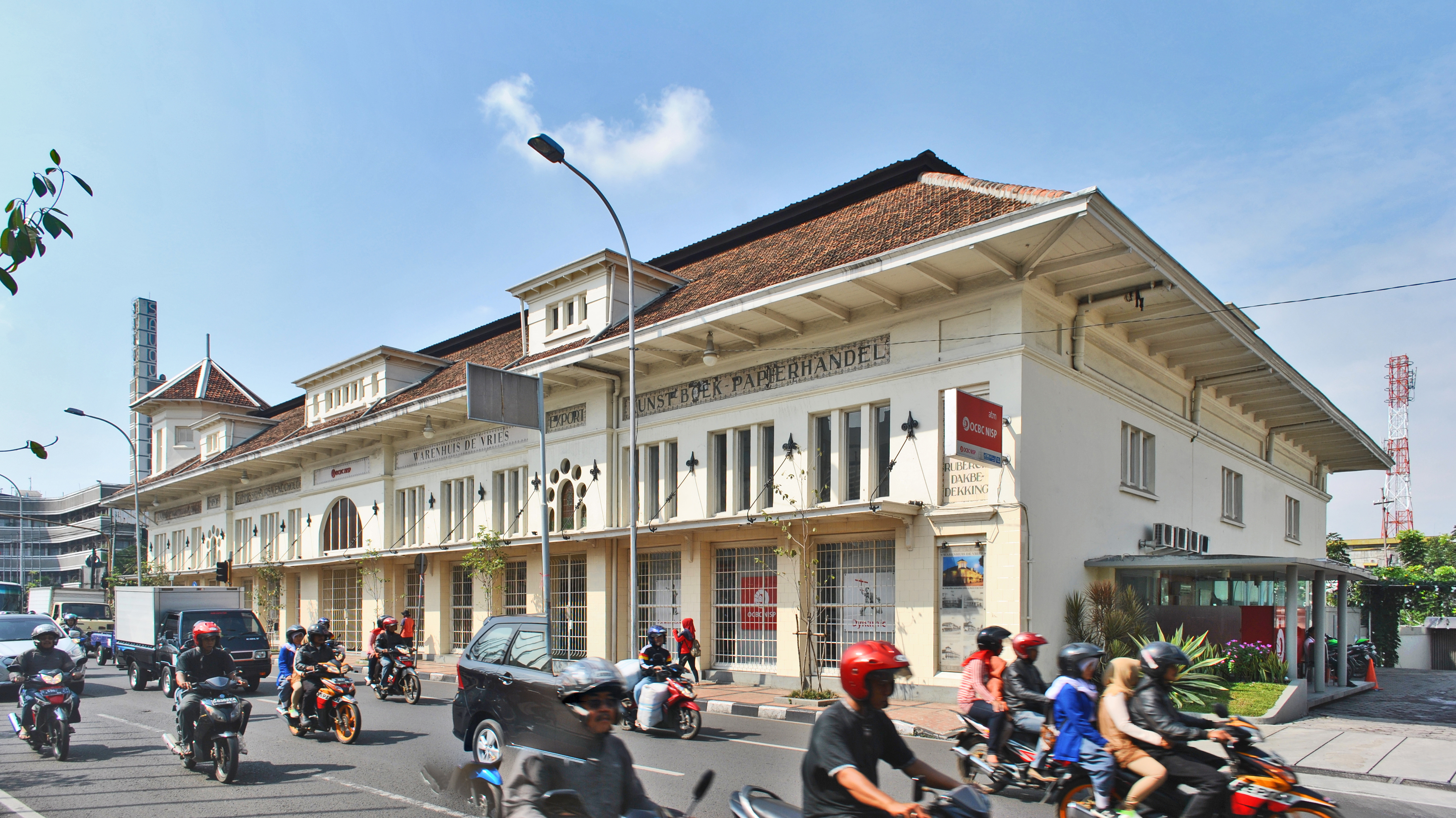
Warenhuis de Vries, Bandung

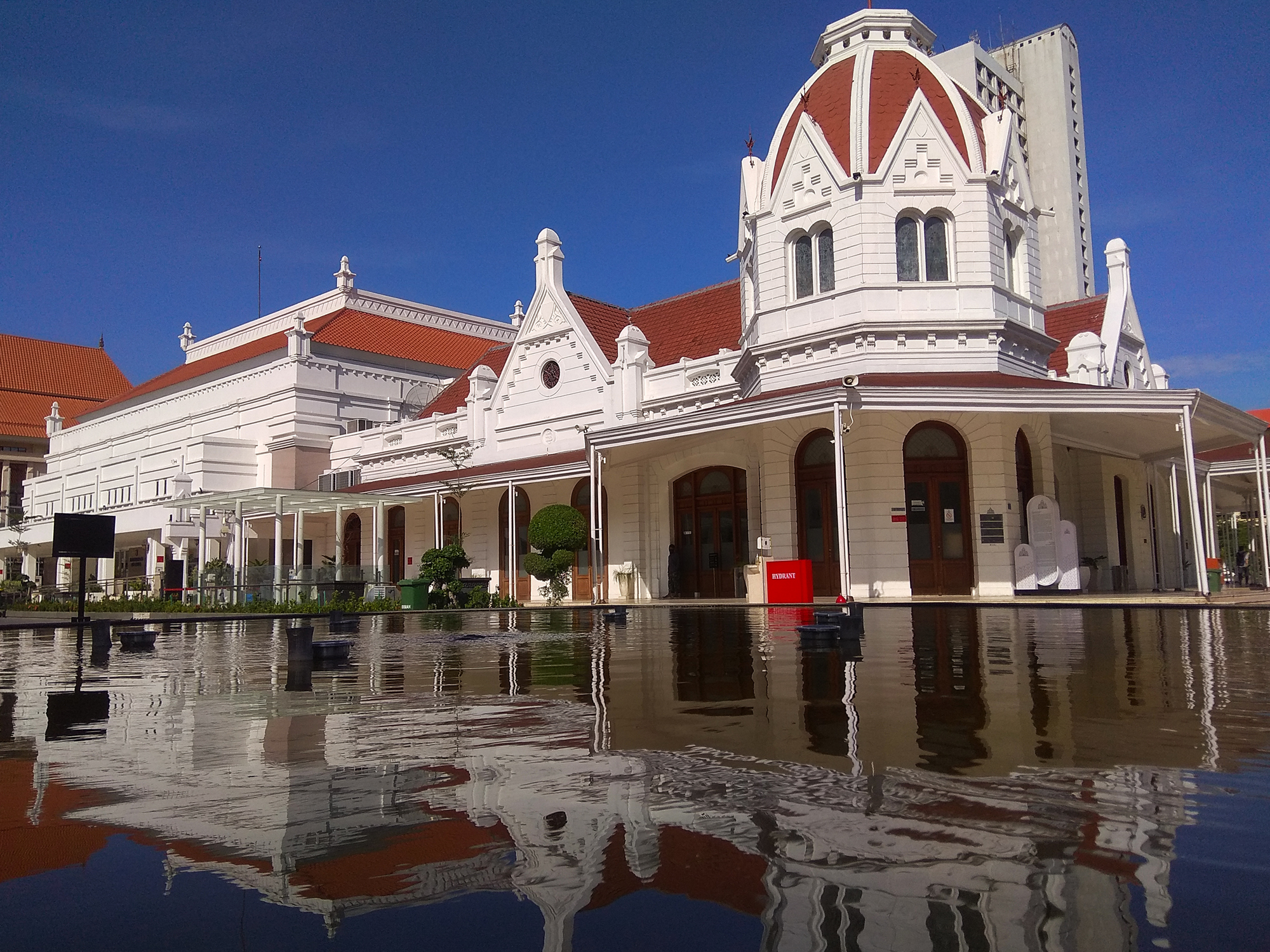
Youth building, Surabaya

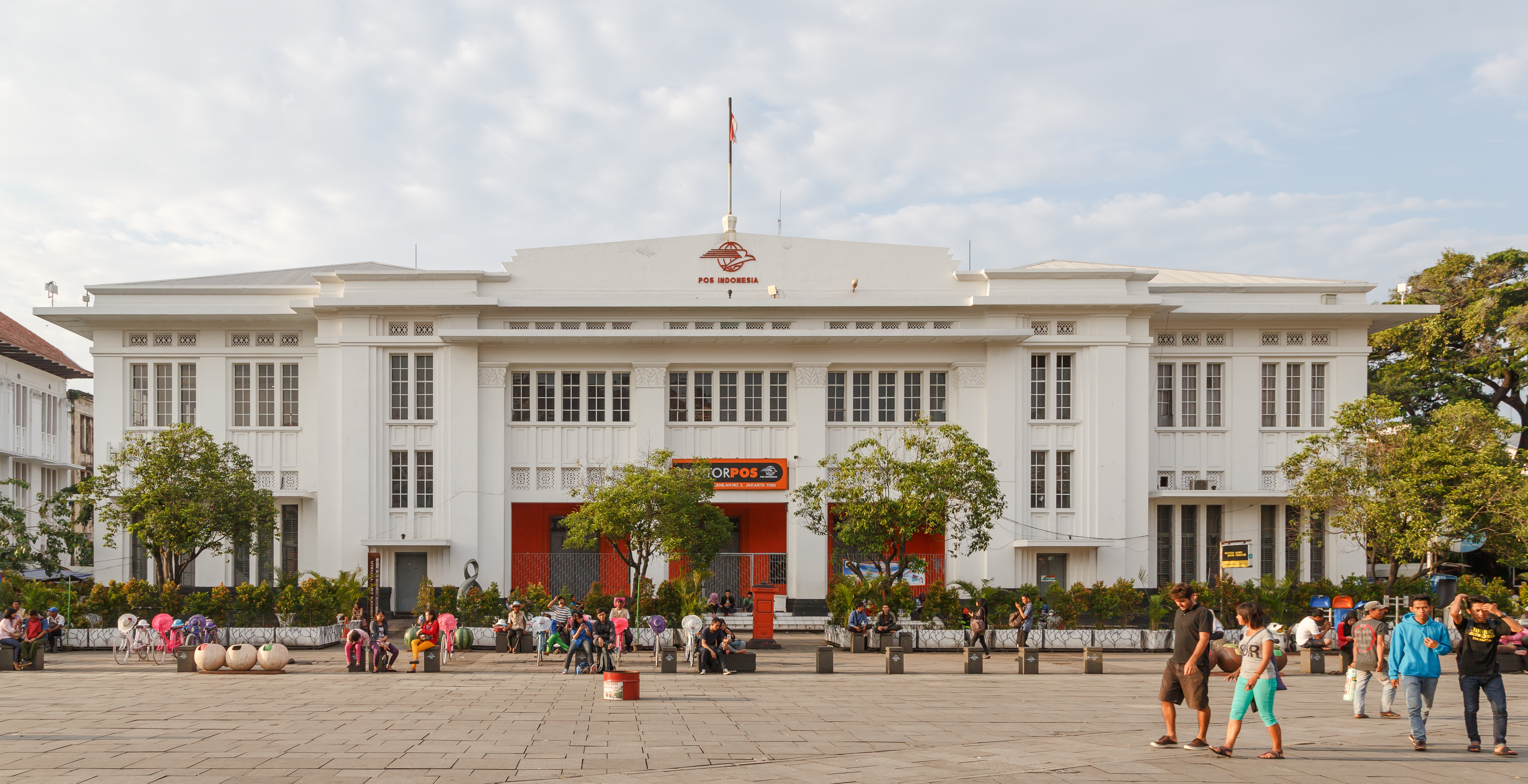
Kota Post Office

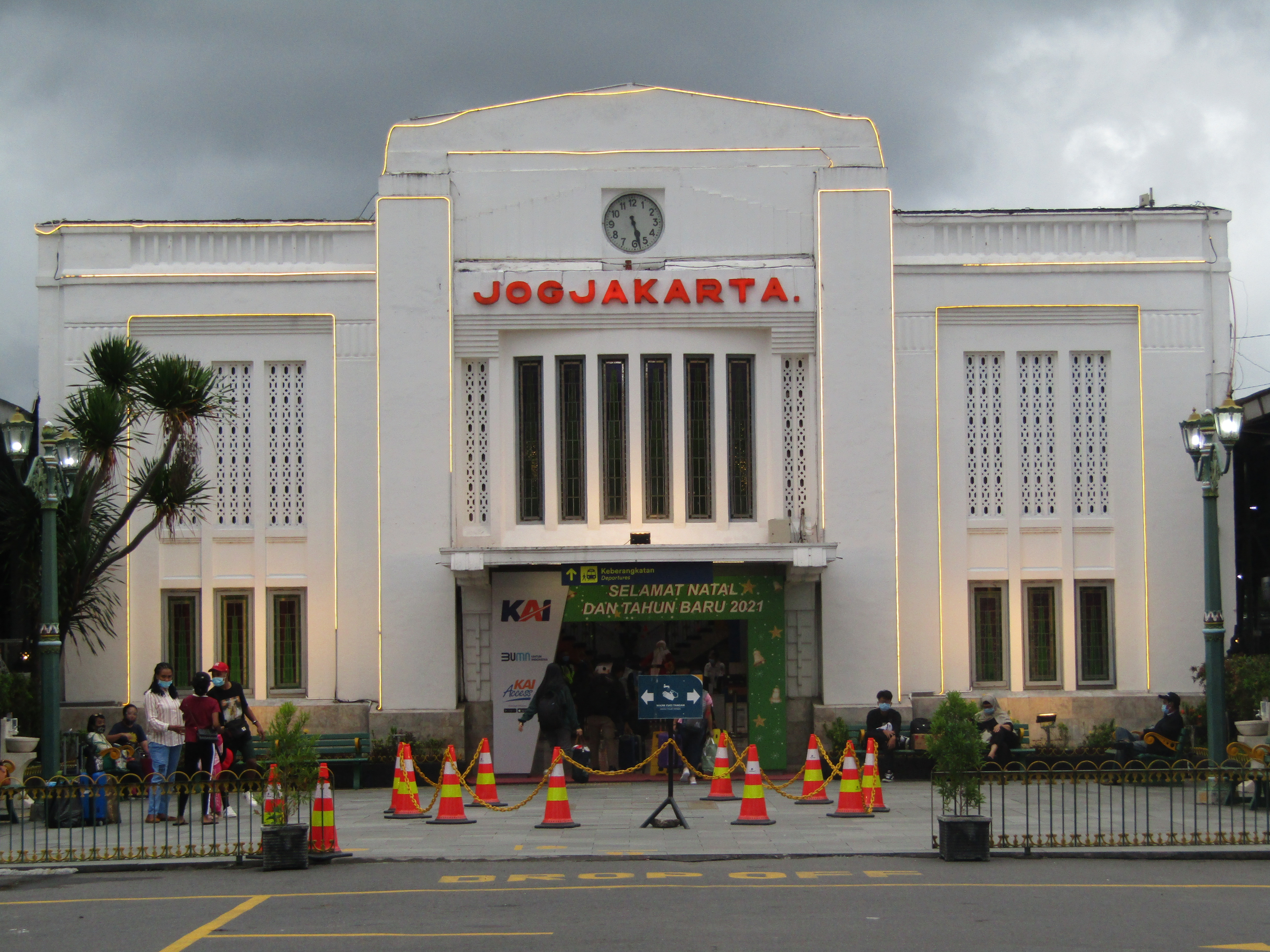
Yogyakarta railway station

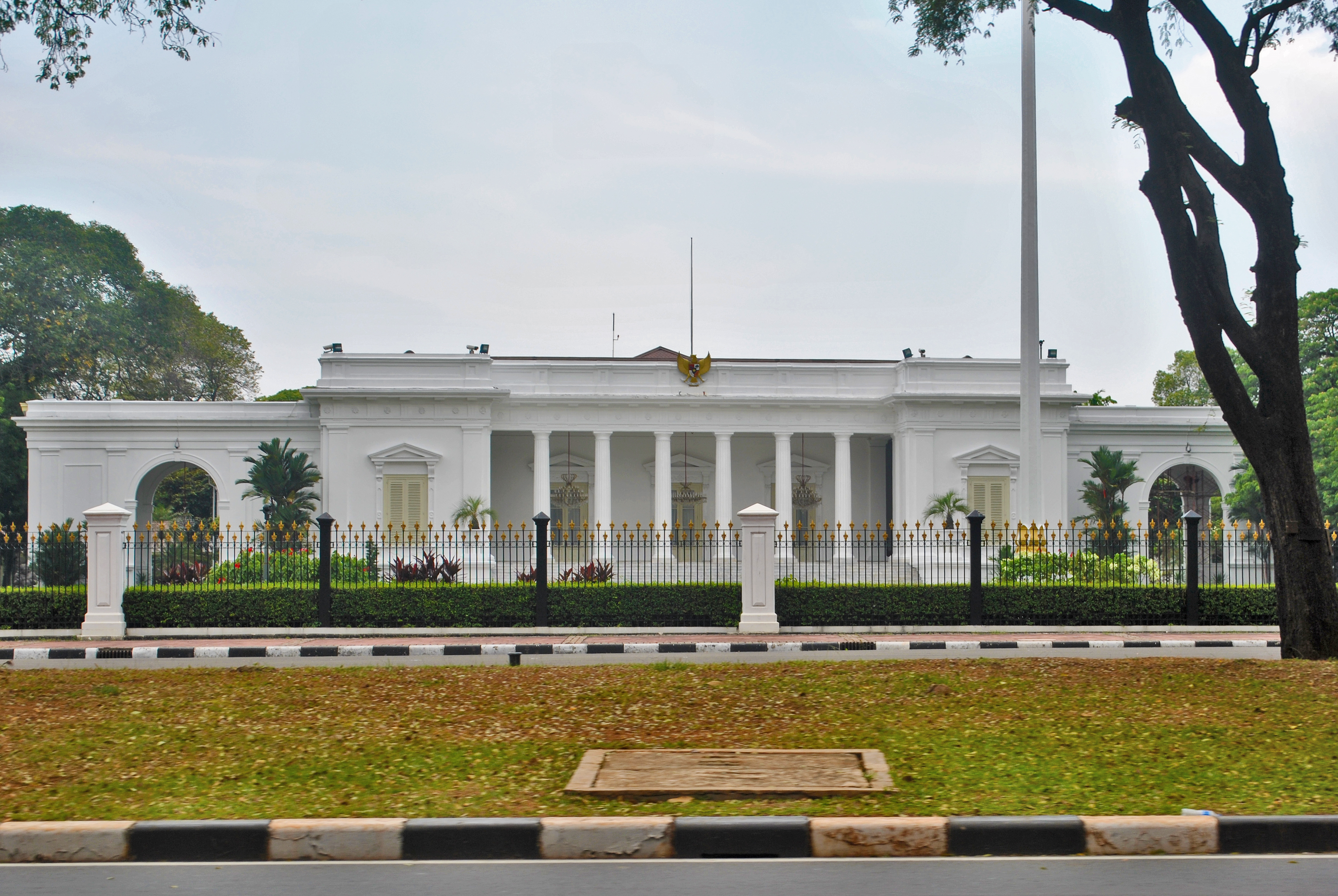
Merdeka Palace, currently resides the president of Indonesia.

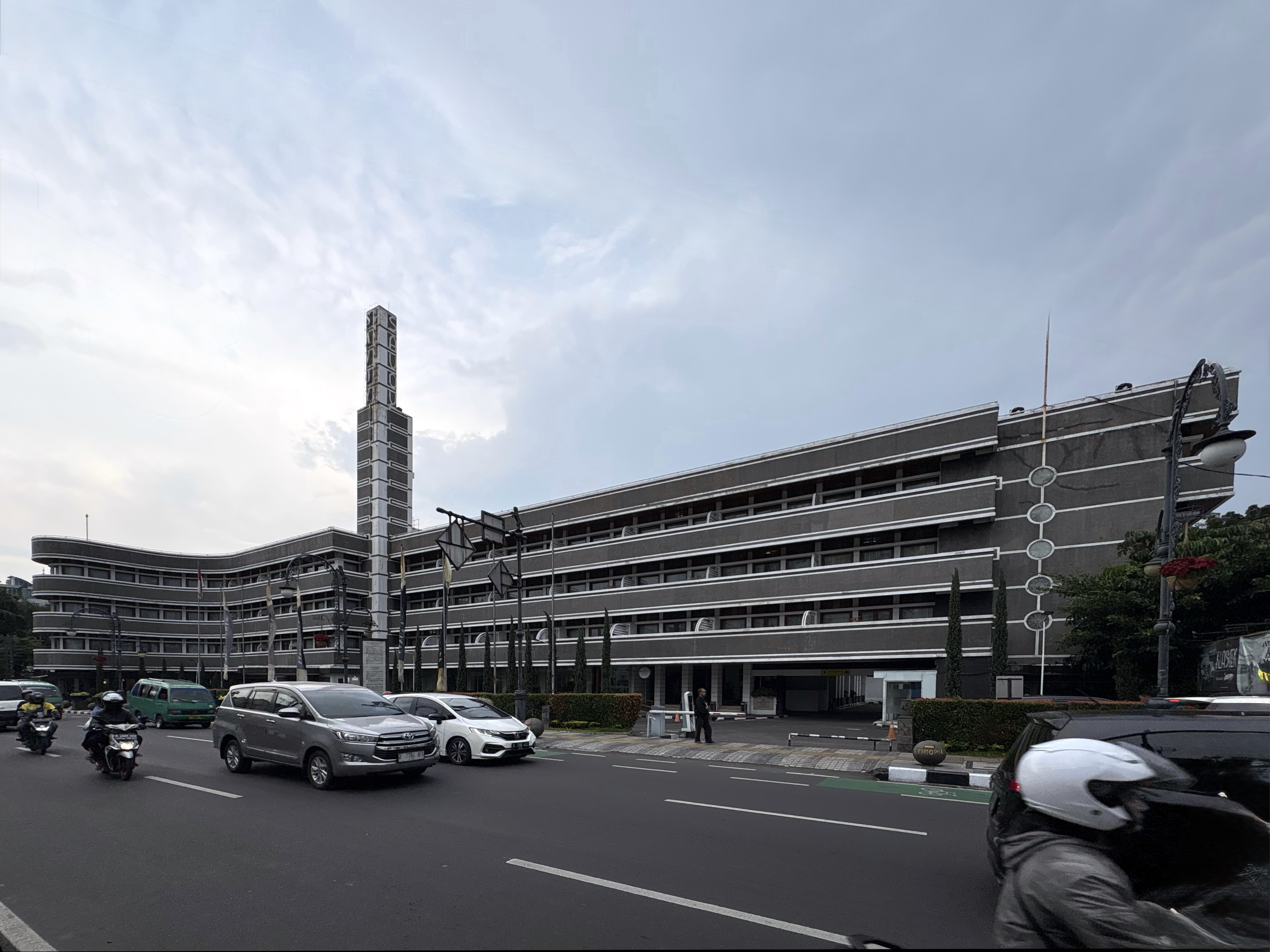
Savoy Homann Hotel with Dutch Art Deco architecture

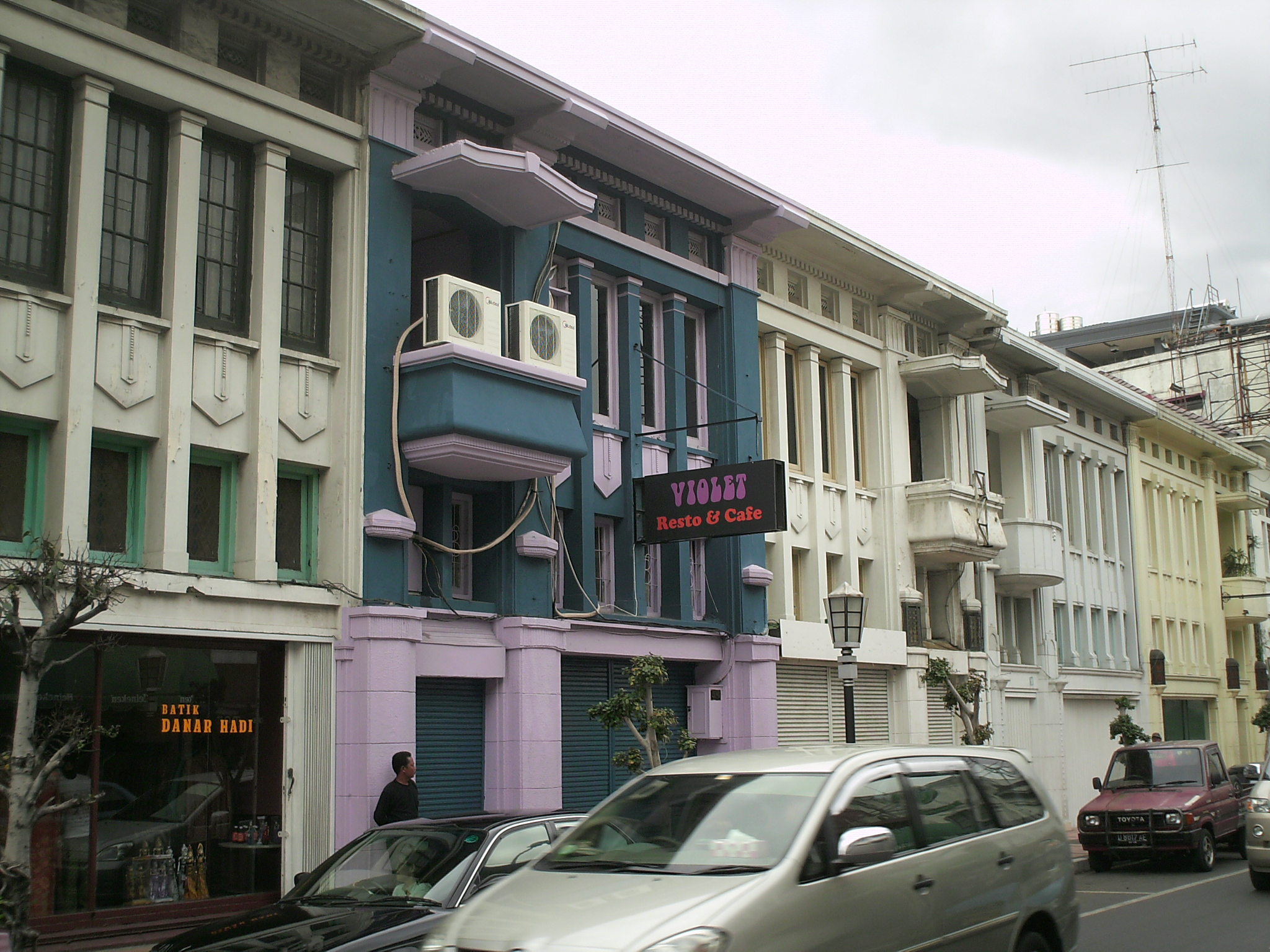
Art Deco Row Buildings at Braga Street

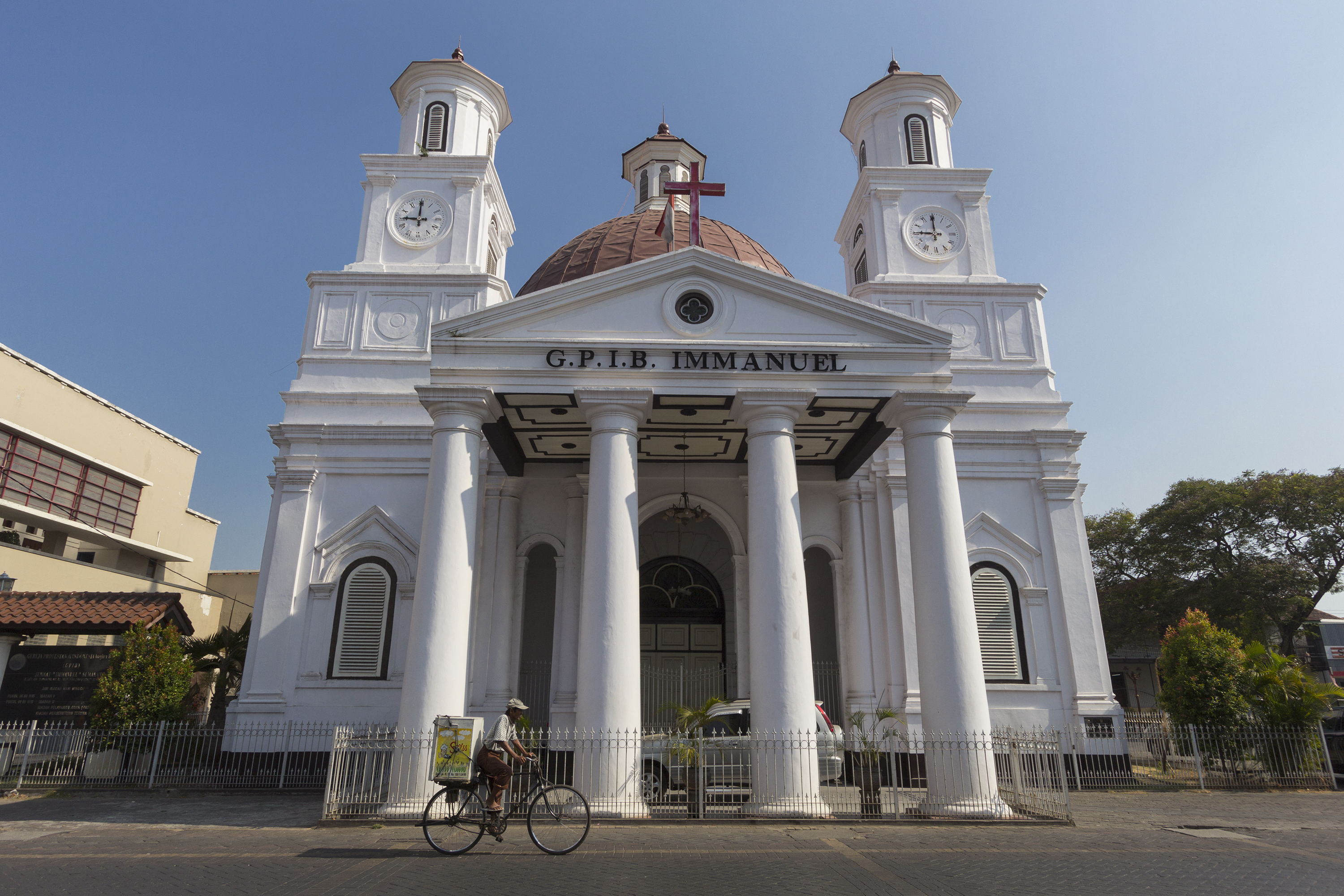
Blenduk Church

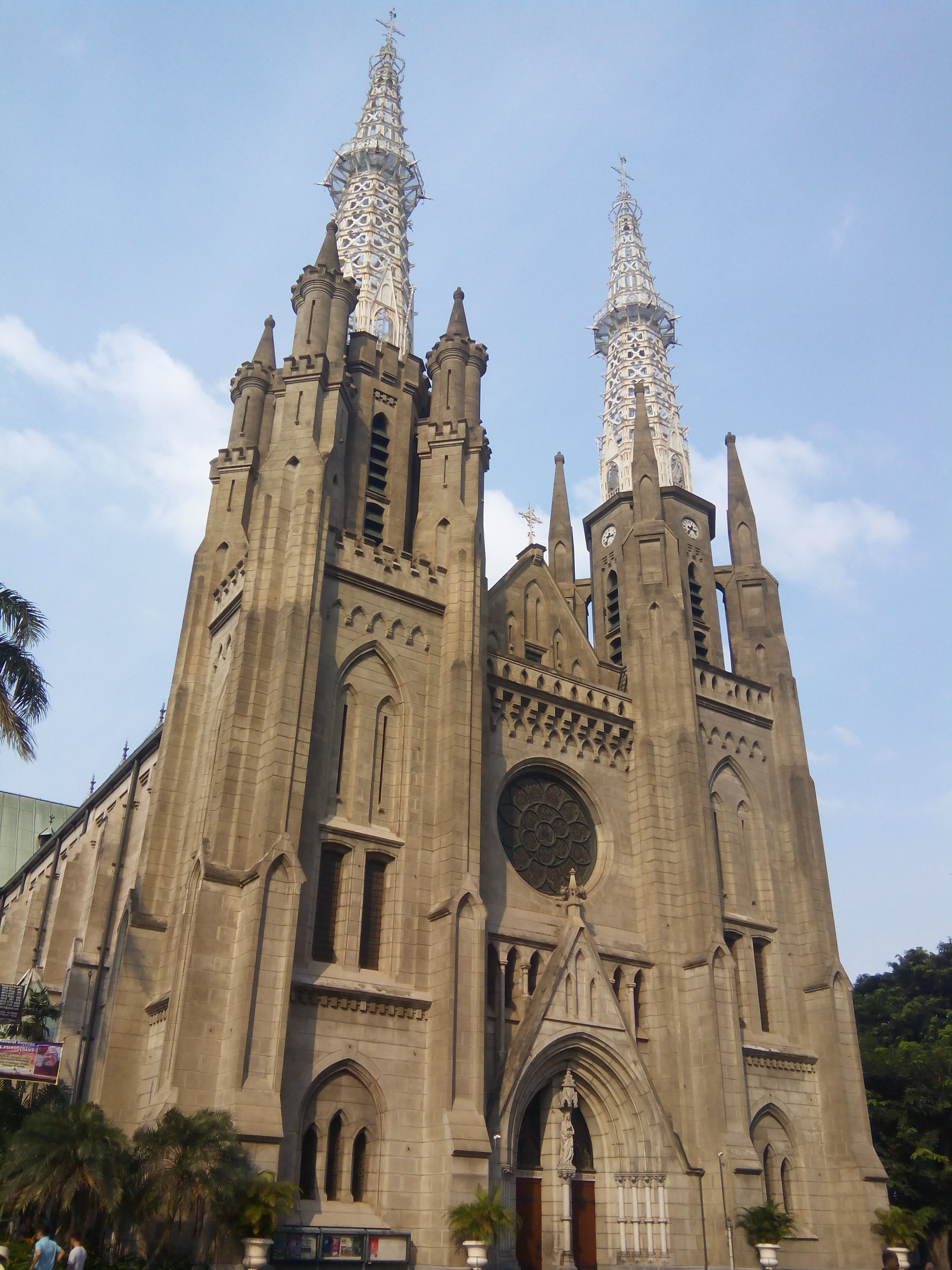
Jakarta Cathedral

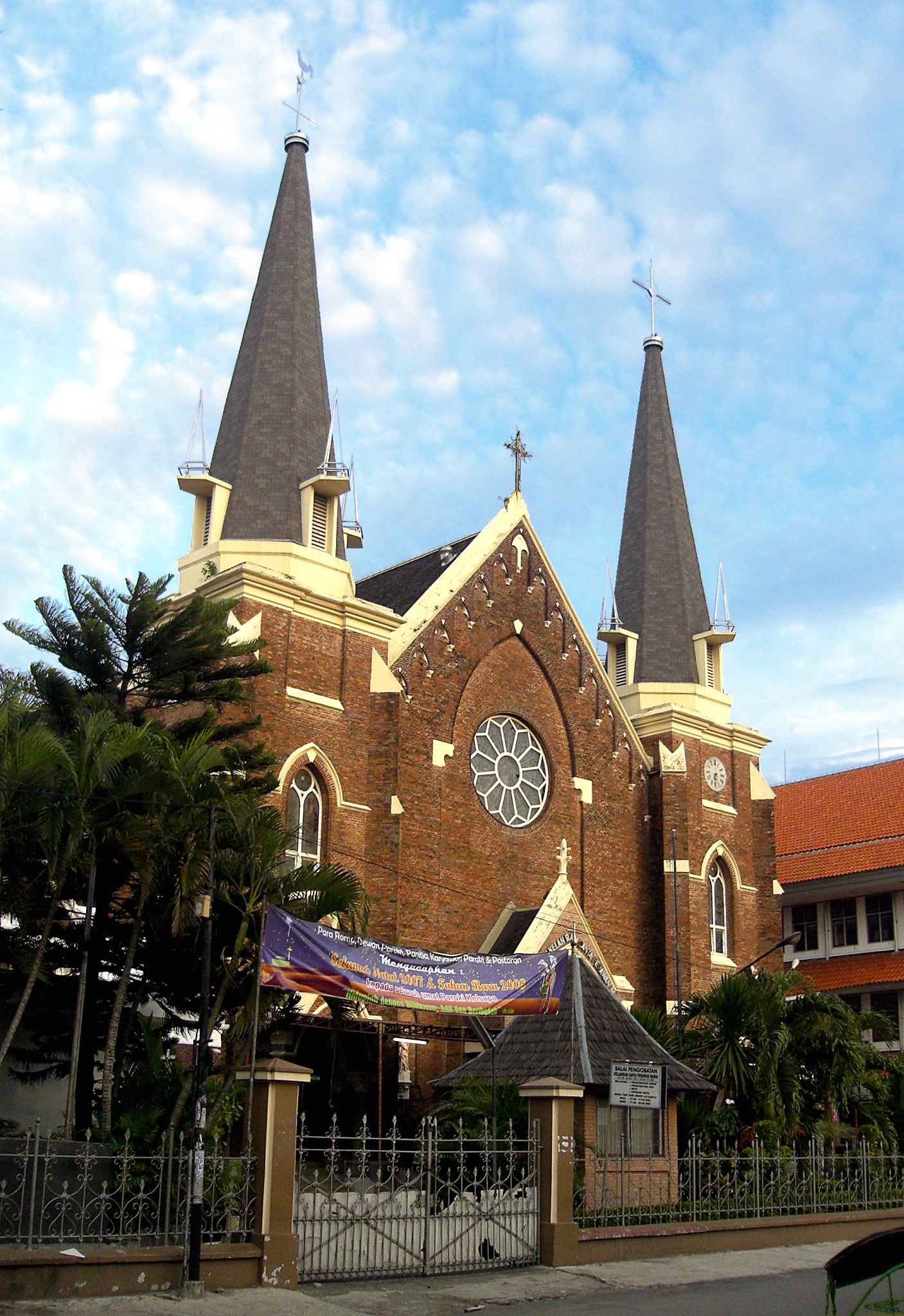
Church of the Birth of Our Lady

== In Americas ==
=== Suriname ===
Suriname's capital, Paramaribo is a former Dutch colonial town from the 17th and 18th centuries planted on the northern coast of tropical South America. The original and highly characteristic street plan of the historic centre remains intact. Its buildings illustrate the gradual fusion of Dutch architectural influence with traditional local techniques and materials.

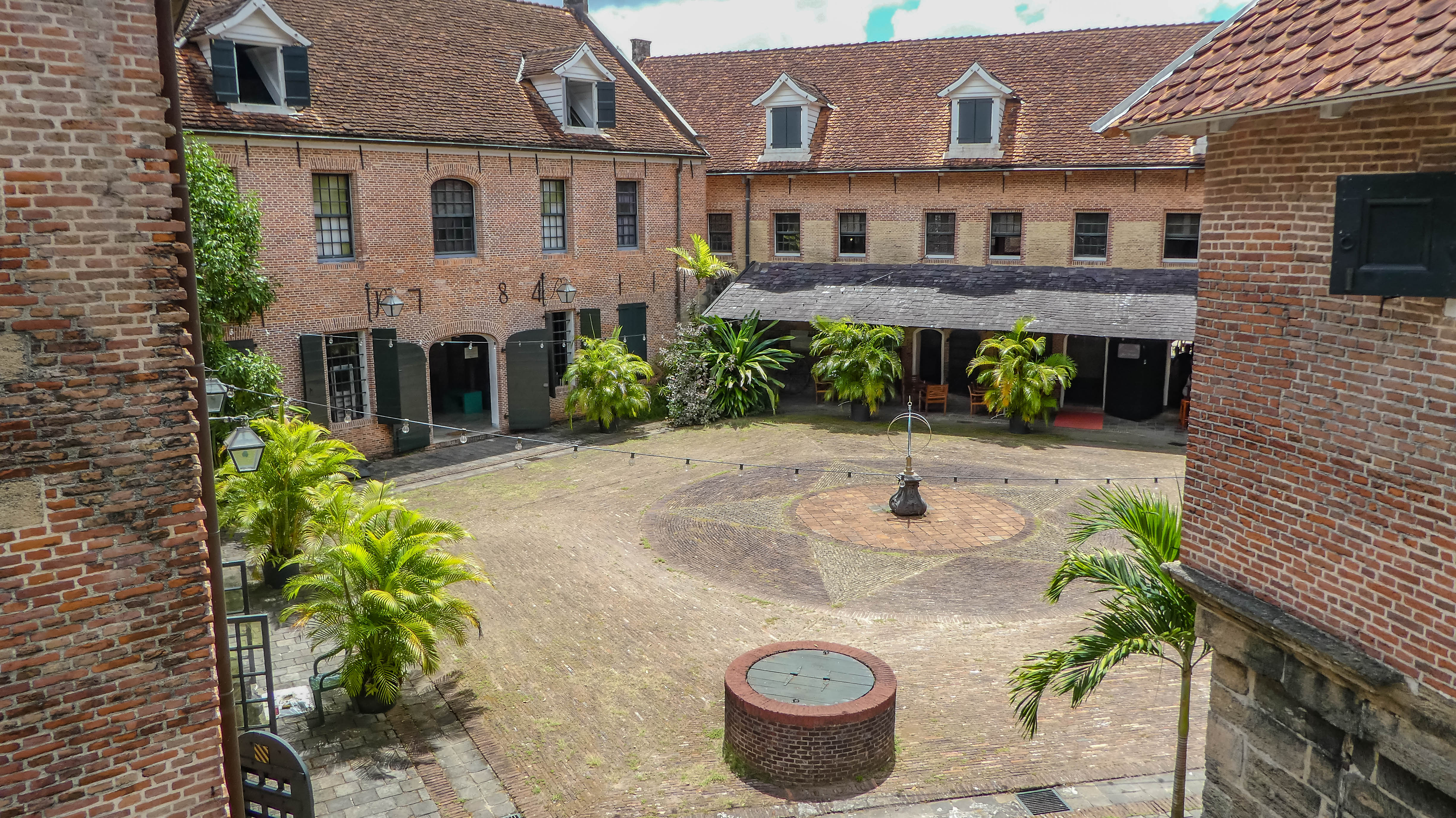
Fort Zeelandia

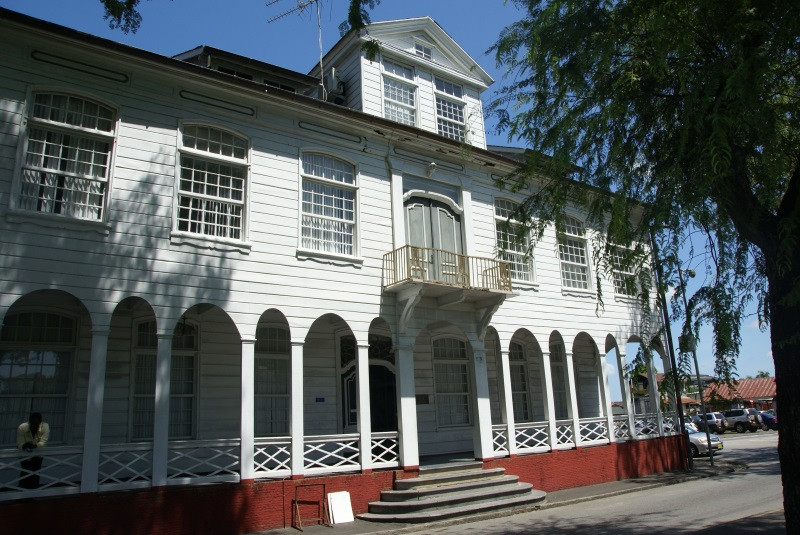
Independence Square (House Du Plessis)

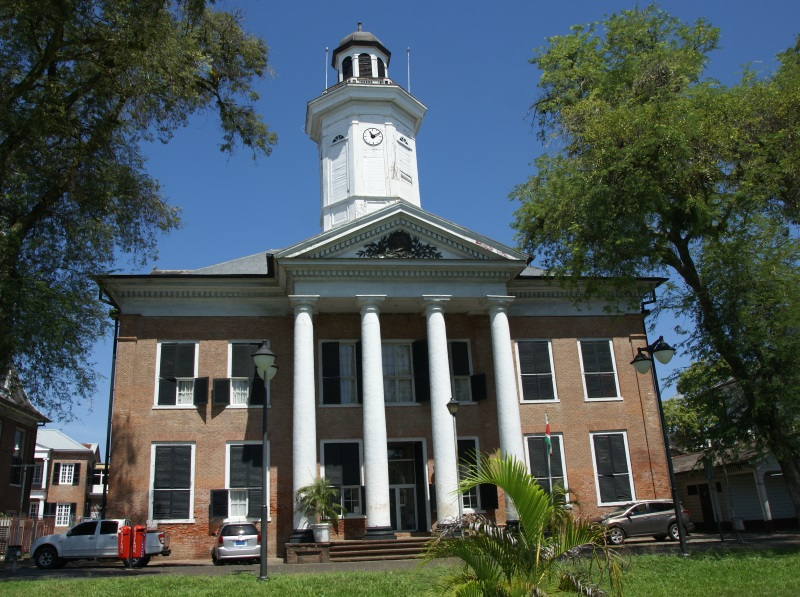
Independence Square (Ministry of Finance)

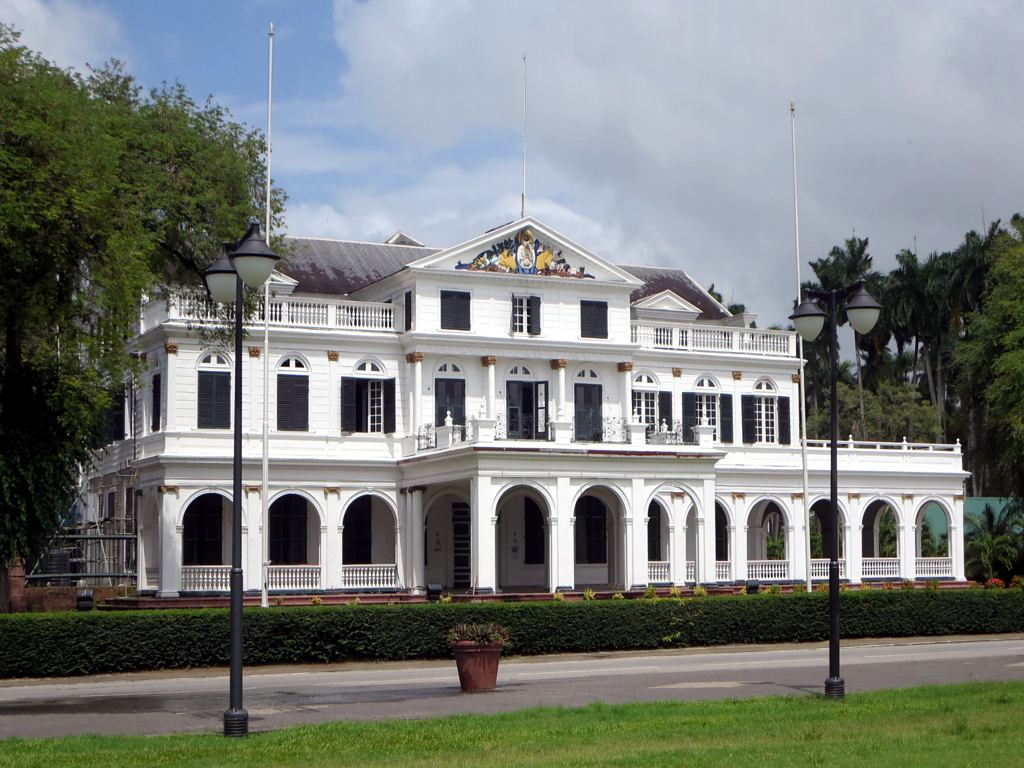
Presidential Palace of Suriname

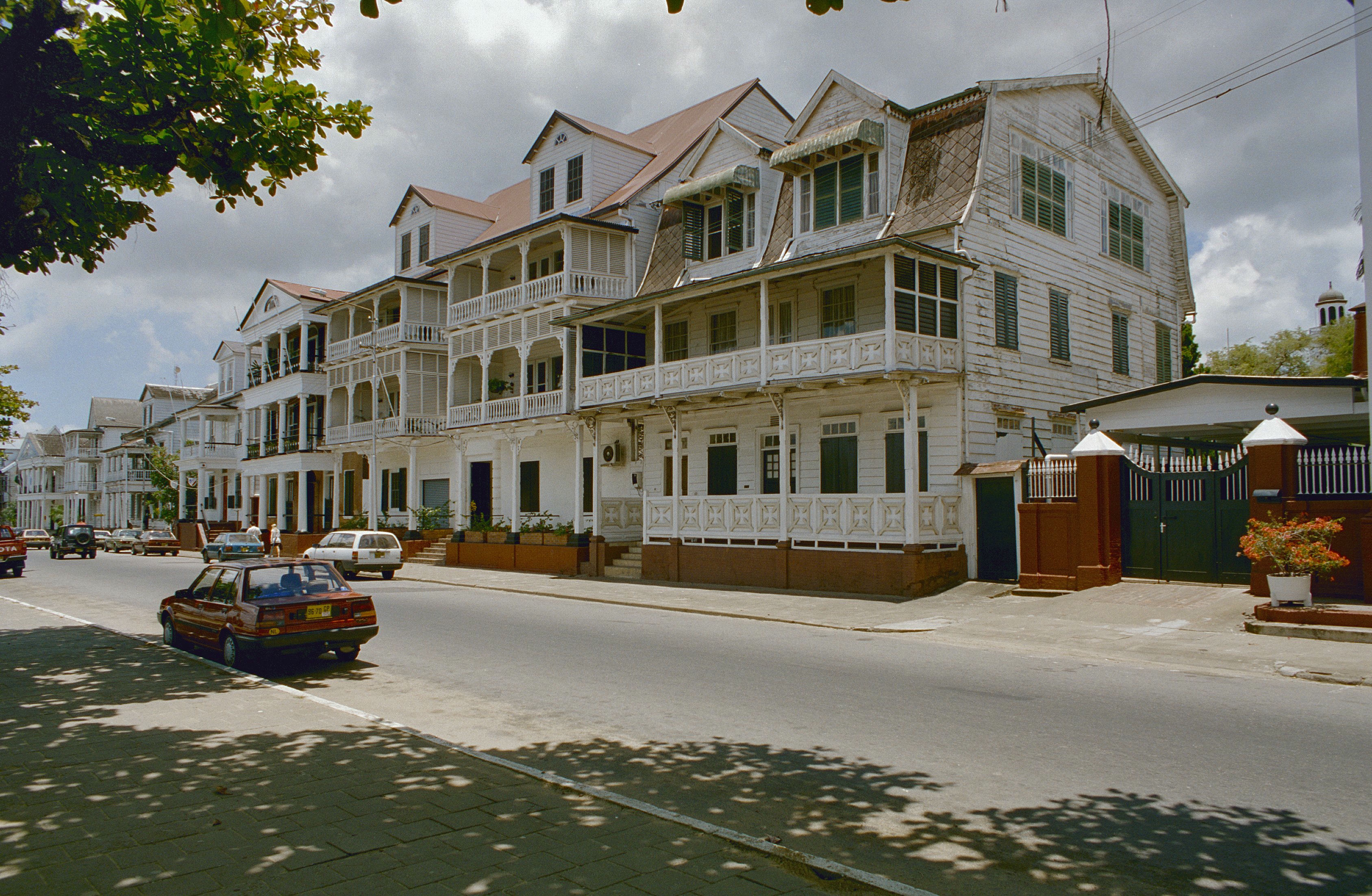
Waterkant

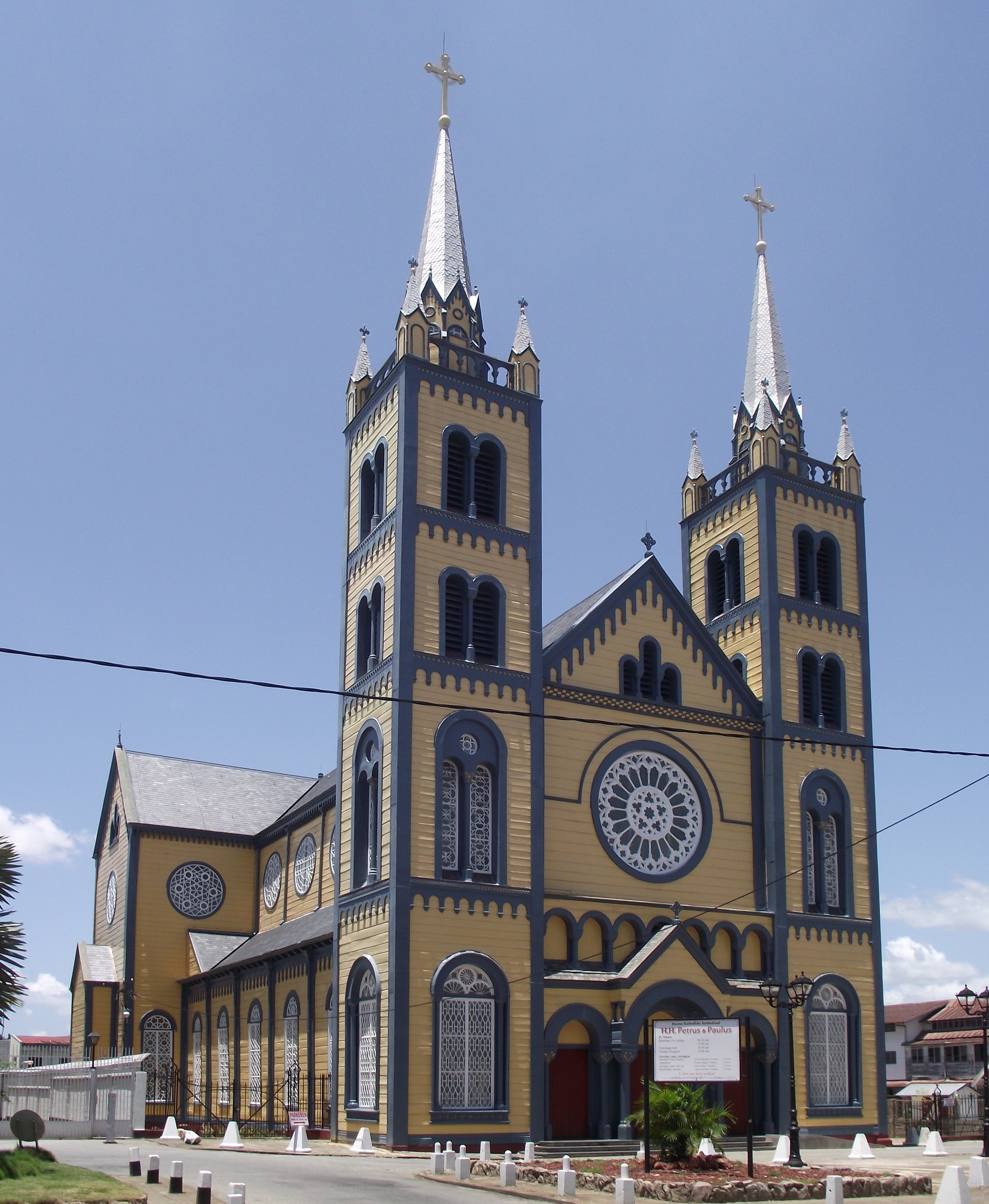
St. Peter and Paul Cathedral

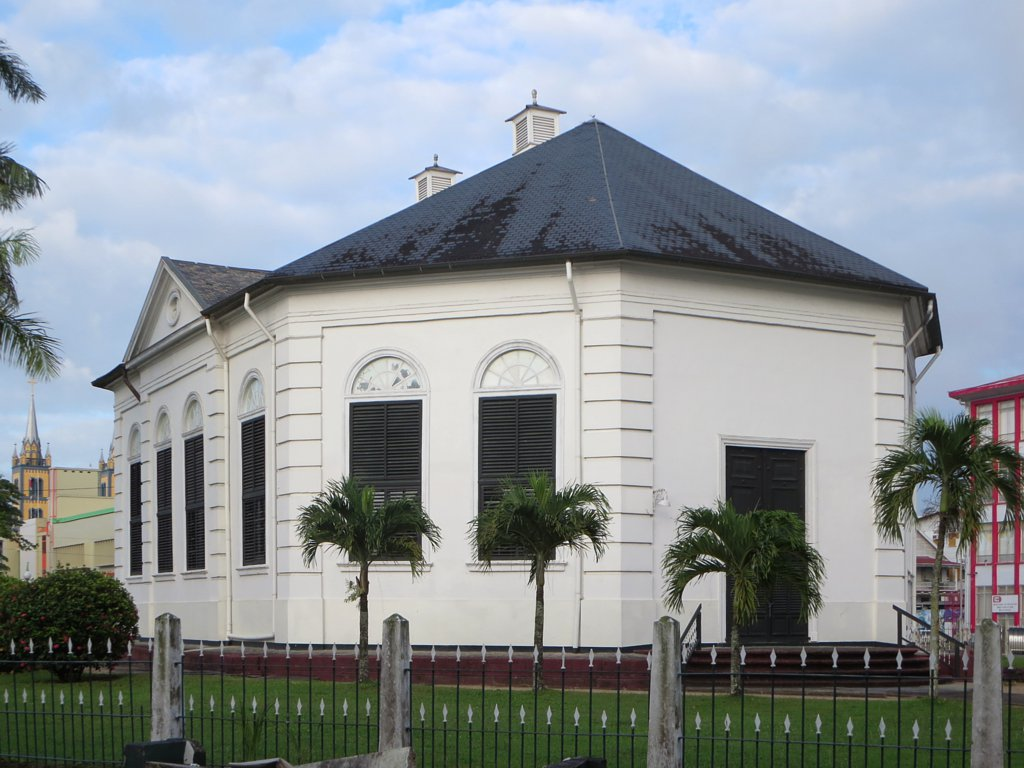
Centrumkerk

=== United States ===
Developed from around 1630 with the arrival of Dutch colonists to New Amsterdam and the Hudson River Valley in what is now New York and in Bergen in what is now New Jersey. Initially the settlers built small, one room cottages with stone walls and steep roofs to allow a second floor loft. By 1670 or so, two-story gable-end homes were common in New Amsterdam.

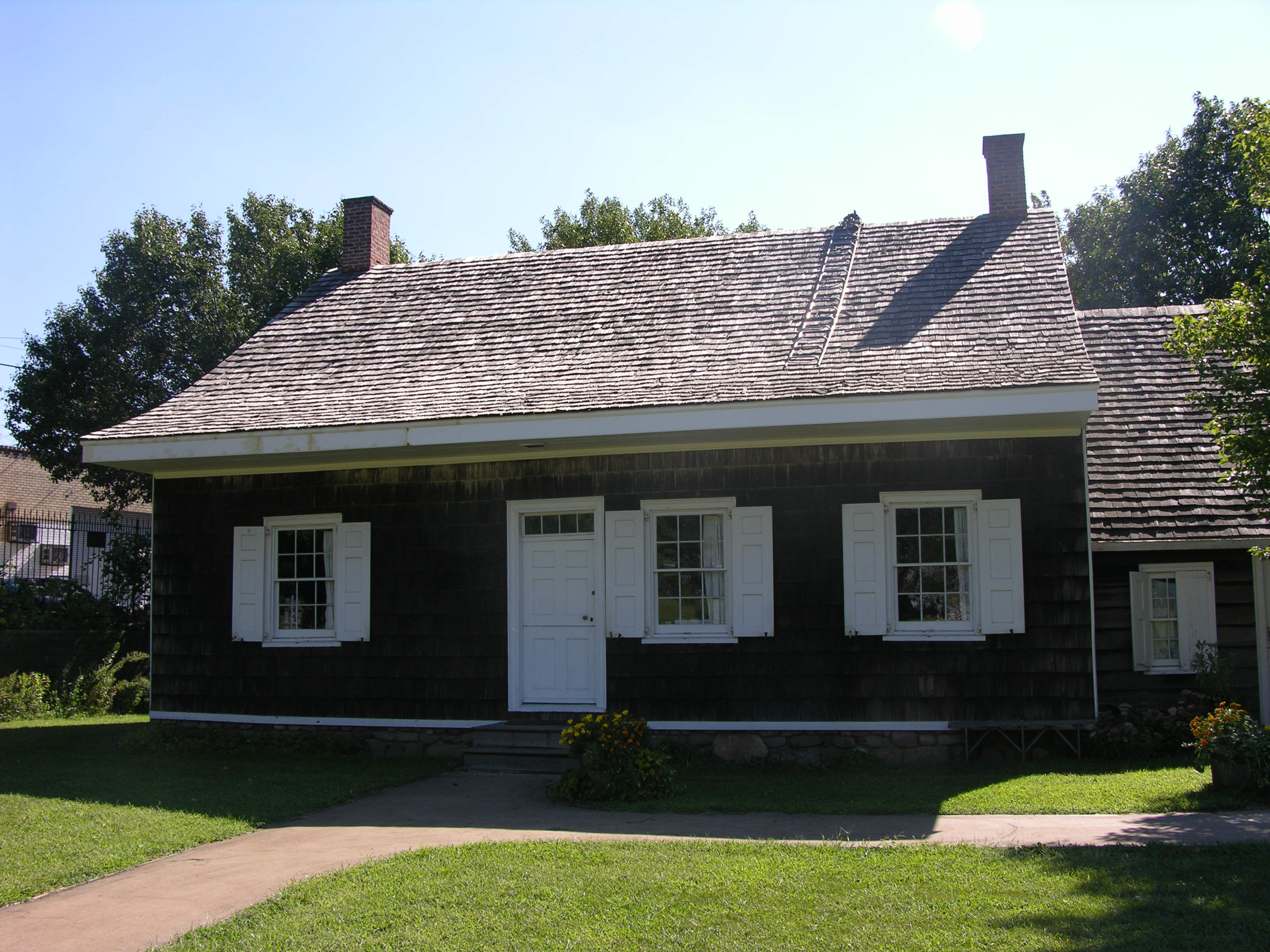
The Wyckoff House in Flatbush, Brooklyn. Some of its construction still dates from the Dutch period of what is currently New York City.

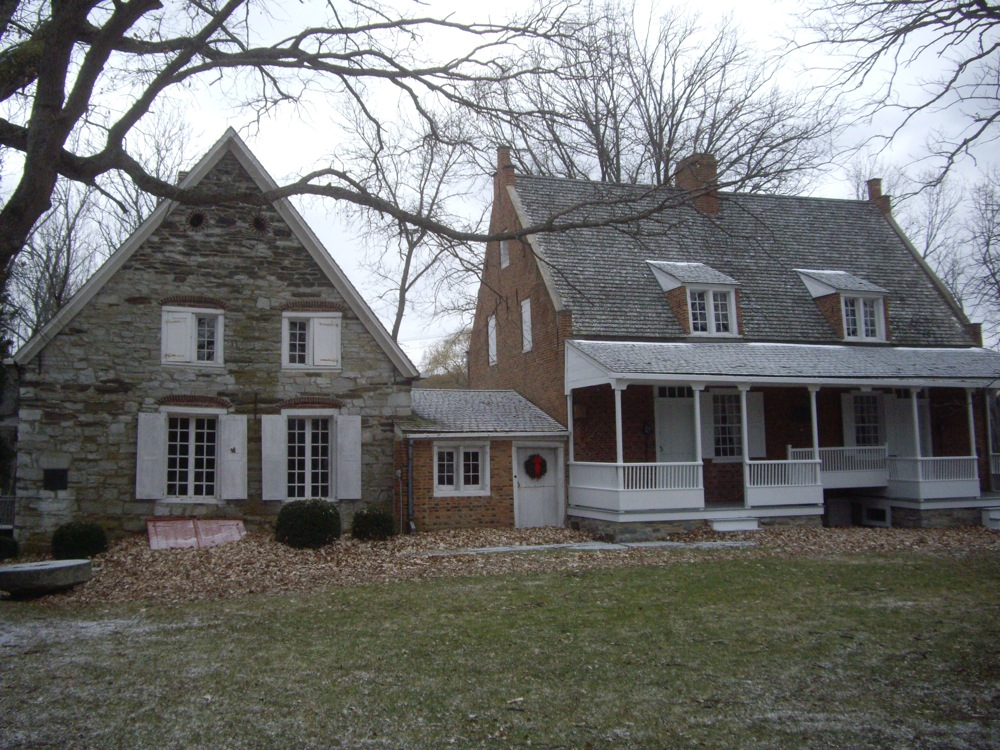
Bronck House, Coxsackie, NY, built 1663; Dutch Colonial

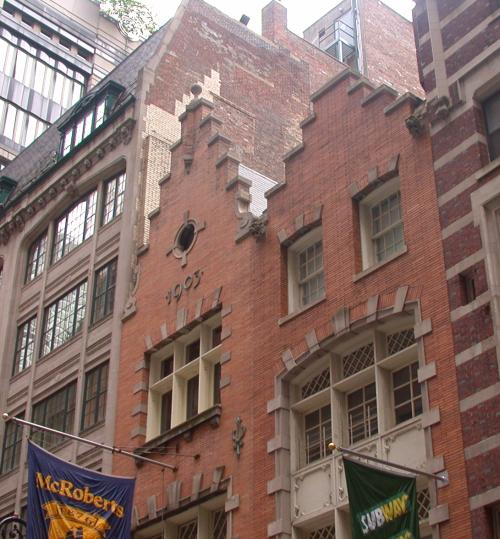
13–15 South William Street, constructed in the Dutch Colonial Revival architecture evoking New Amsterdam

==== Dutch Colonial Revival architecture ====
Dutch Colonial is a style of domestic architecture, primarily characterized by gambrel roofs having curved eaves along the length of the house. Modern versions built in the early 20th century are more accurately referred to as "Dutch Colonial Revival", a subtype of the Colonial Revival style.

== In South Asia ==
=== India ===
The Dutch came to India in the early 17th century and their influence and dominance is seen most in Kerala, though they occupied other parts of the country, such as, some areas along the southern Coromandel Coast and Gujarat. However, it is in Kerala, especially Cochin that Dutch architecture finds it existence. On the eastern coast, Pulicat was the first settlement of Dutch India and till date is home to the Dutch cemetery visited by tourists.

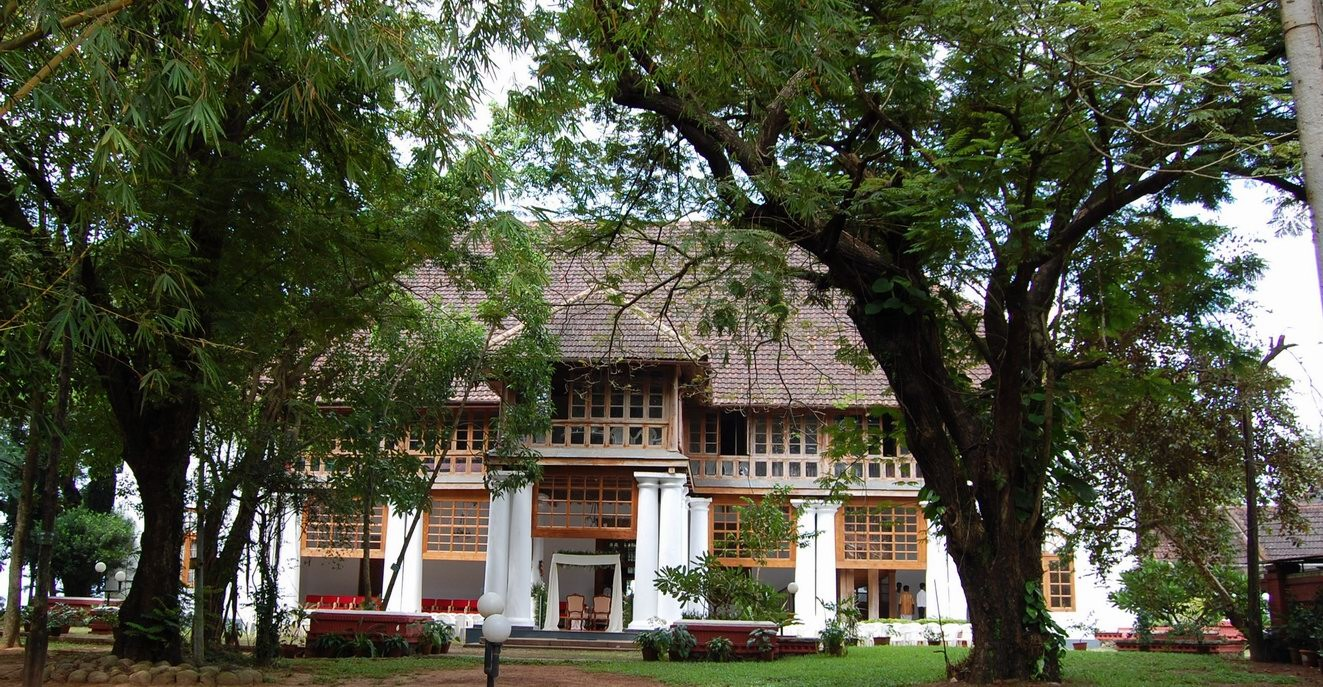
Bolgatty Palace, Kochi

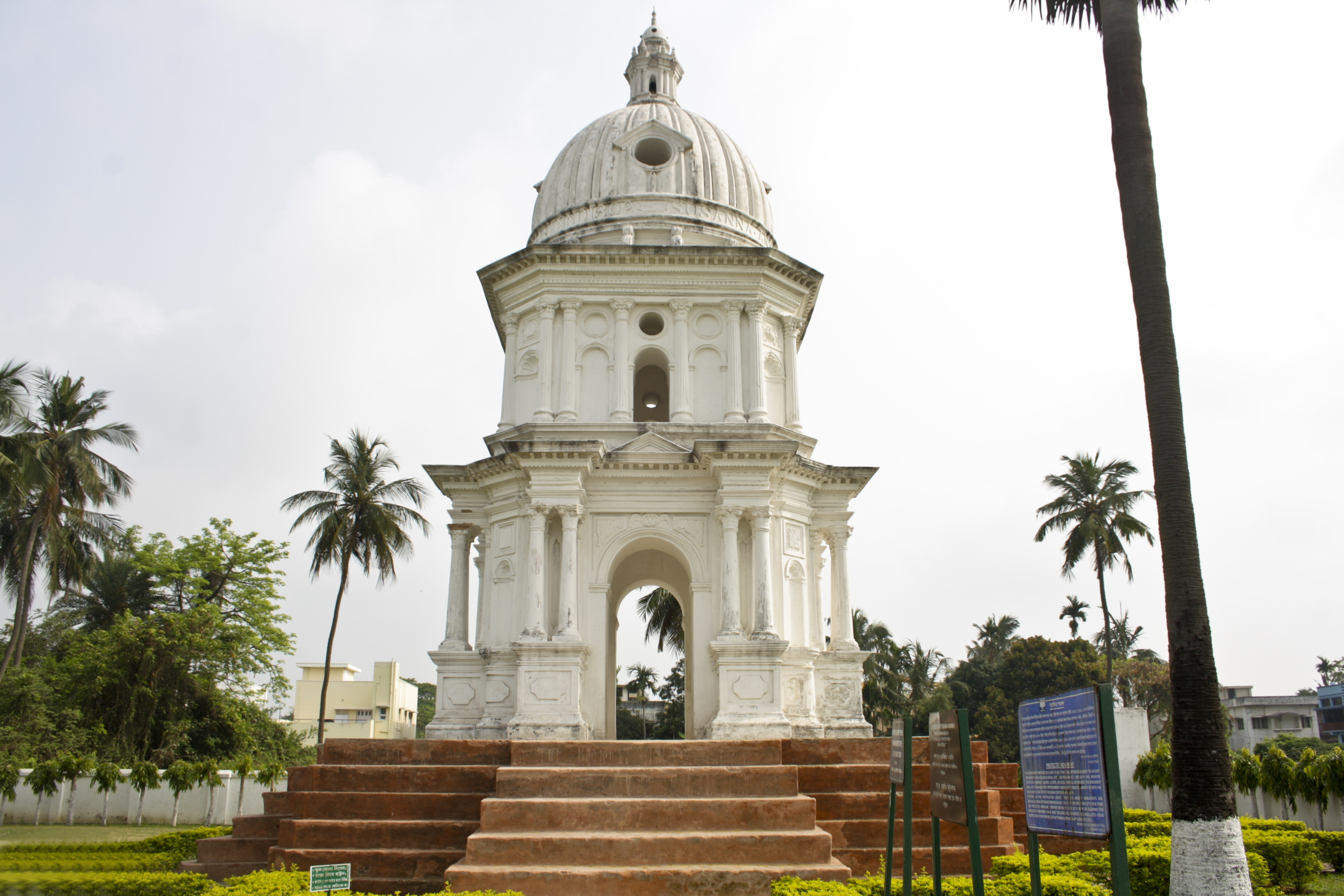
Dutch Memorial Monument of Susanna Anna Maria, Hugli-Chuchura

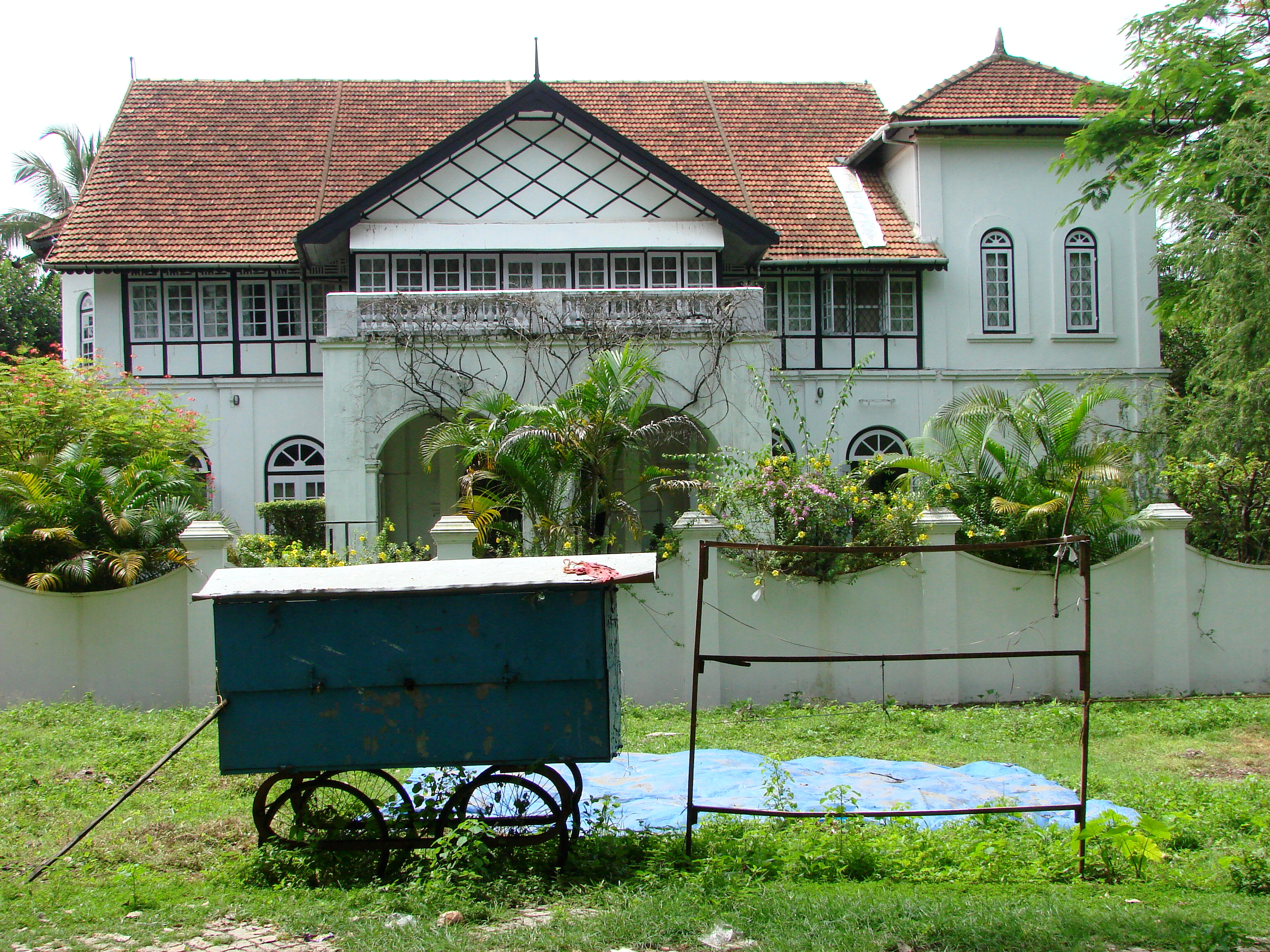
Typical Dutch colonial architecture in Old Cochin, Kochi

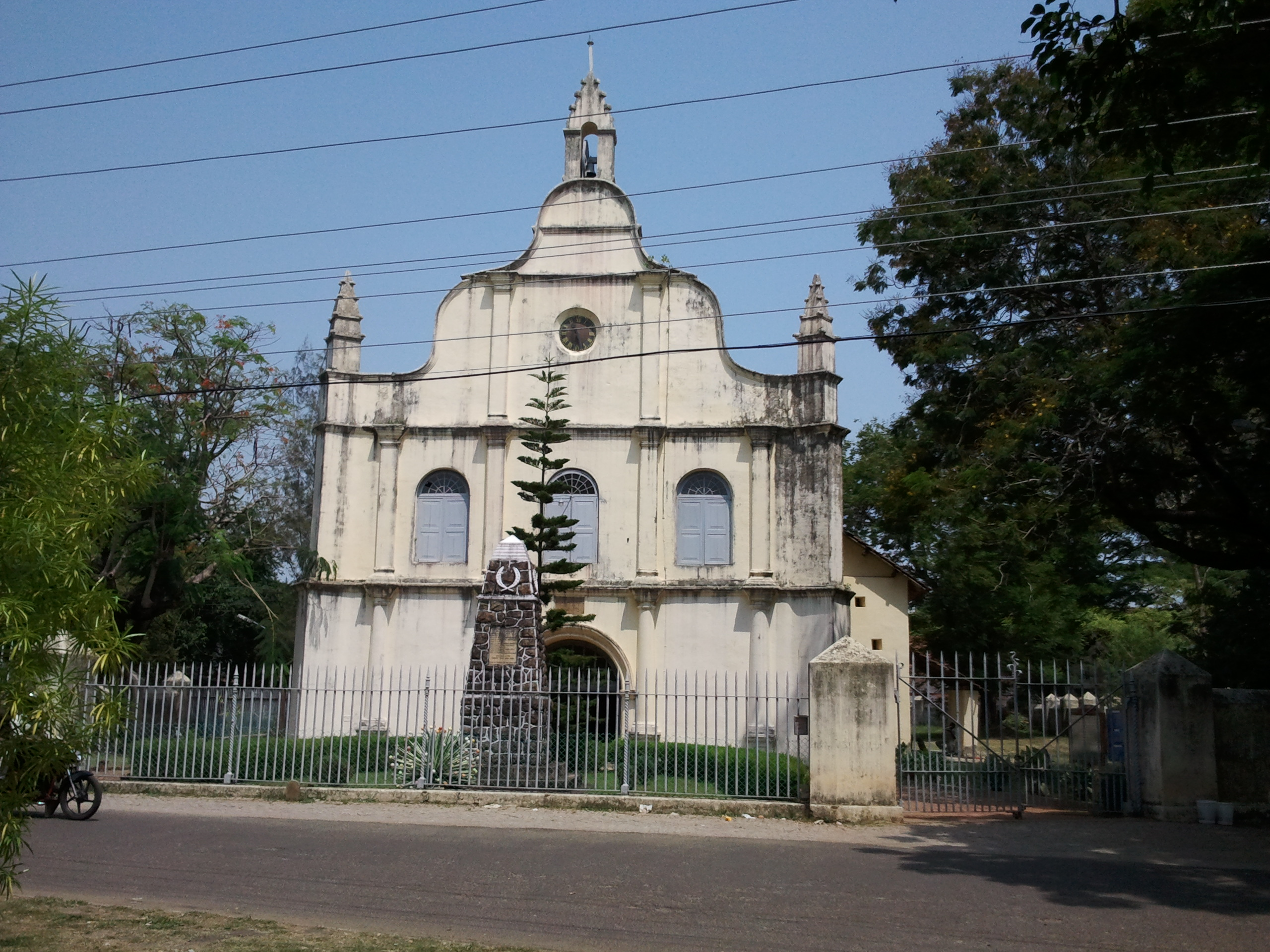
Ruins of St. Francis Church, Fort Kochi

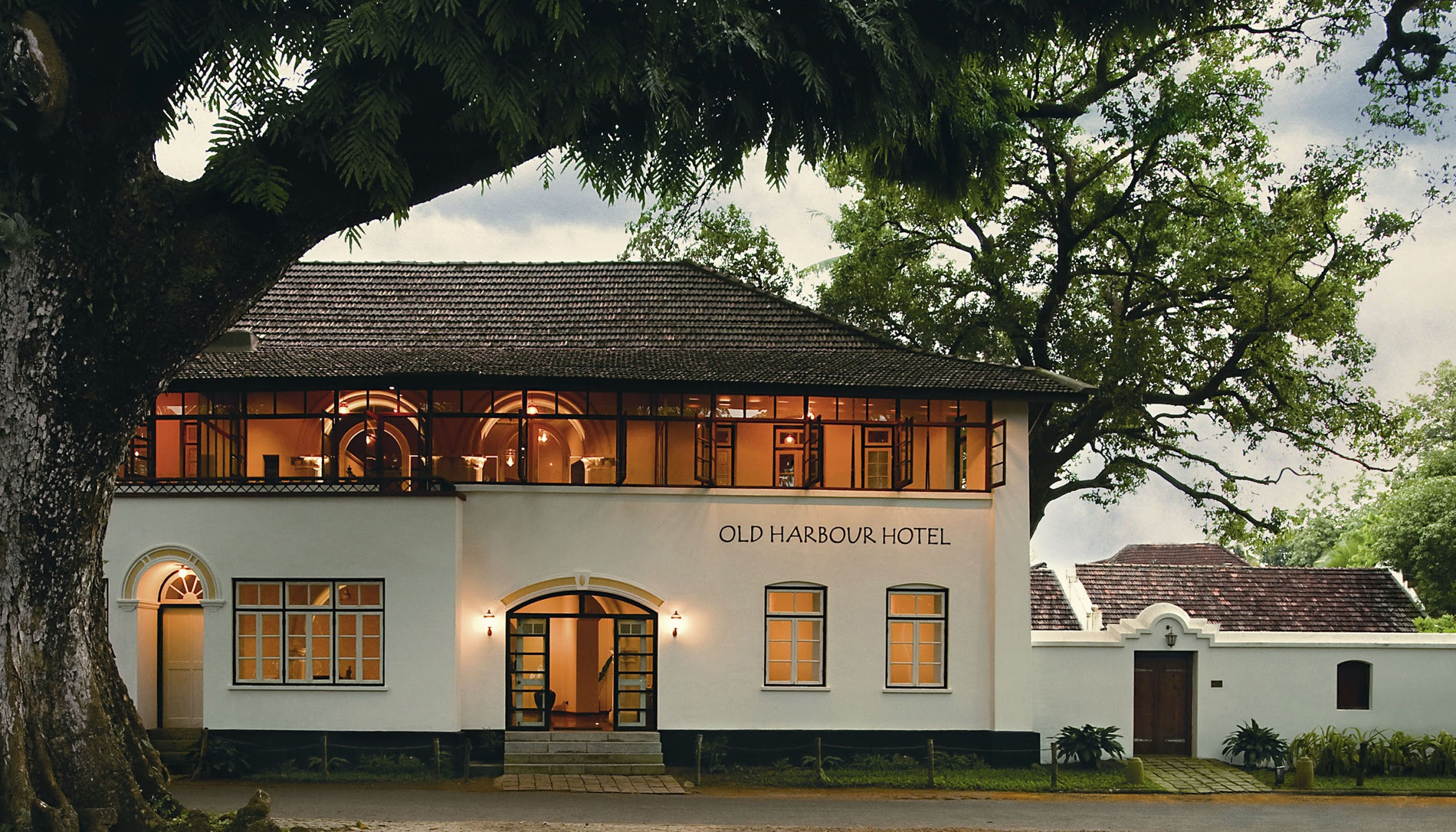
Old Harbour Hotel, Kochi

=== Sri Lanka ===
Many building from the Dutch Ceylon era could be found on the coastal parts of the island. For example, the old town of Galle and its fortifications built by the Dutch in the year 1663 make up a UNESCO World Heritage Site. Historic buildings, such as old churches, can be found in many Sri Lankan cities and towns.

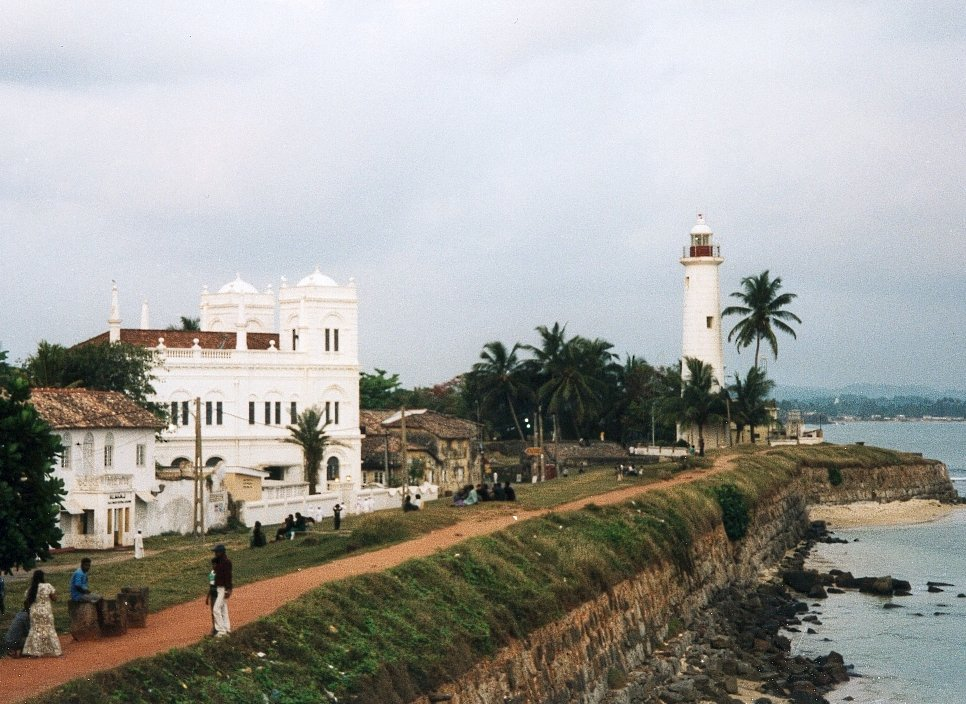
Dutch ramparts of the Galle fort

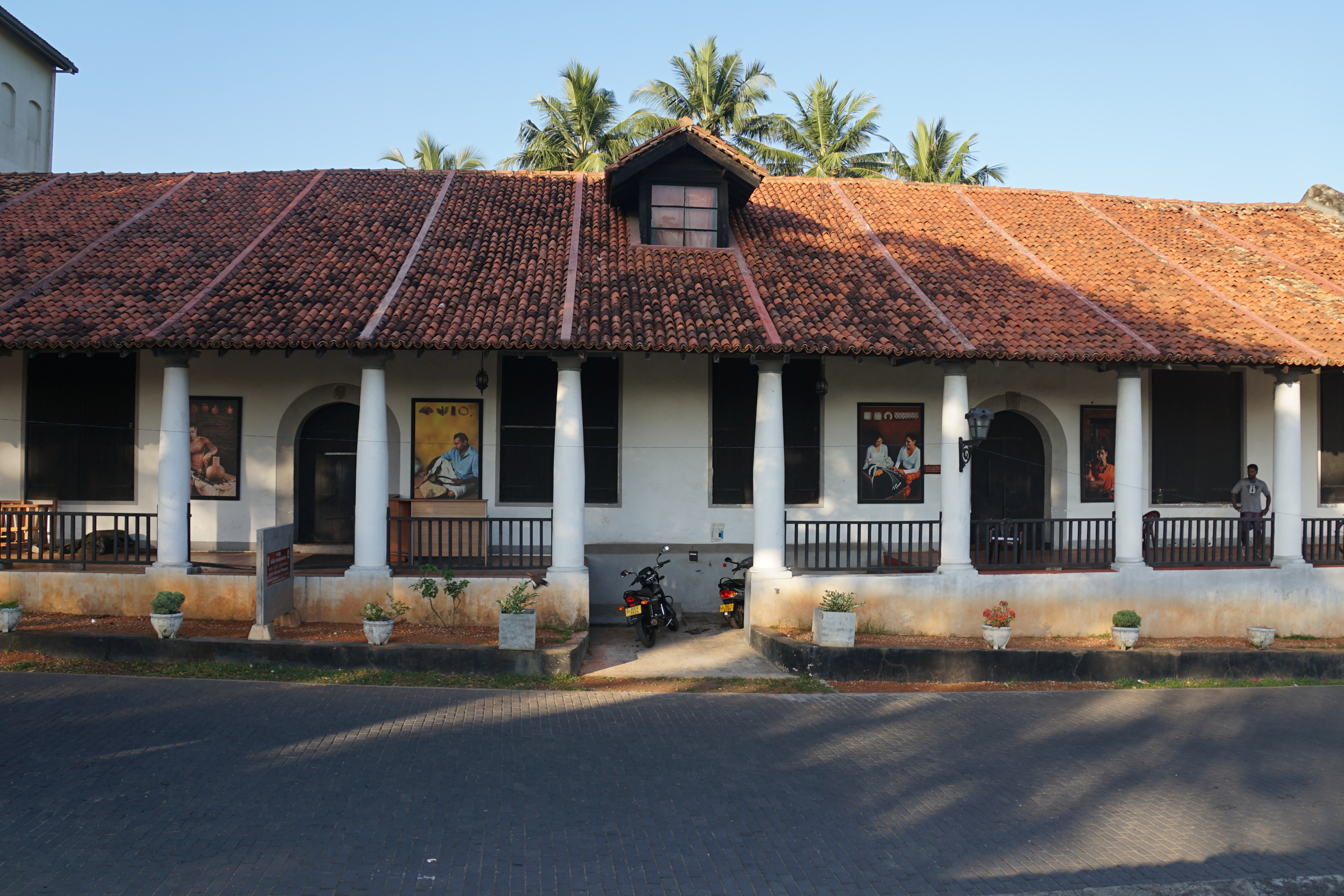
National Museum of Galle, former Dutch Comissariat

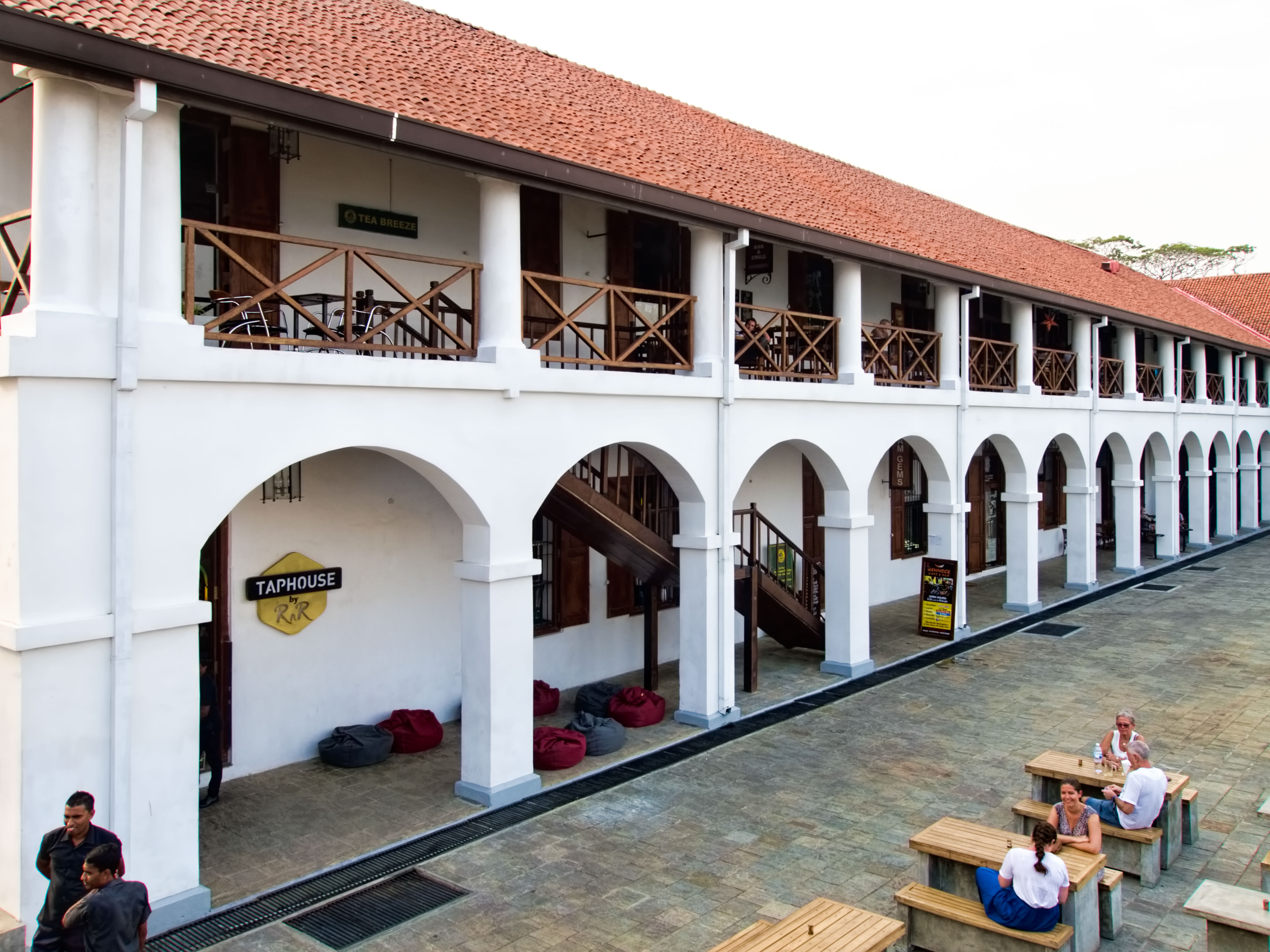
Old Dutch Hospital, Galle

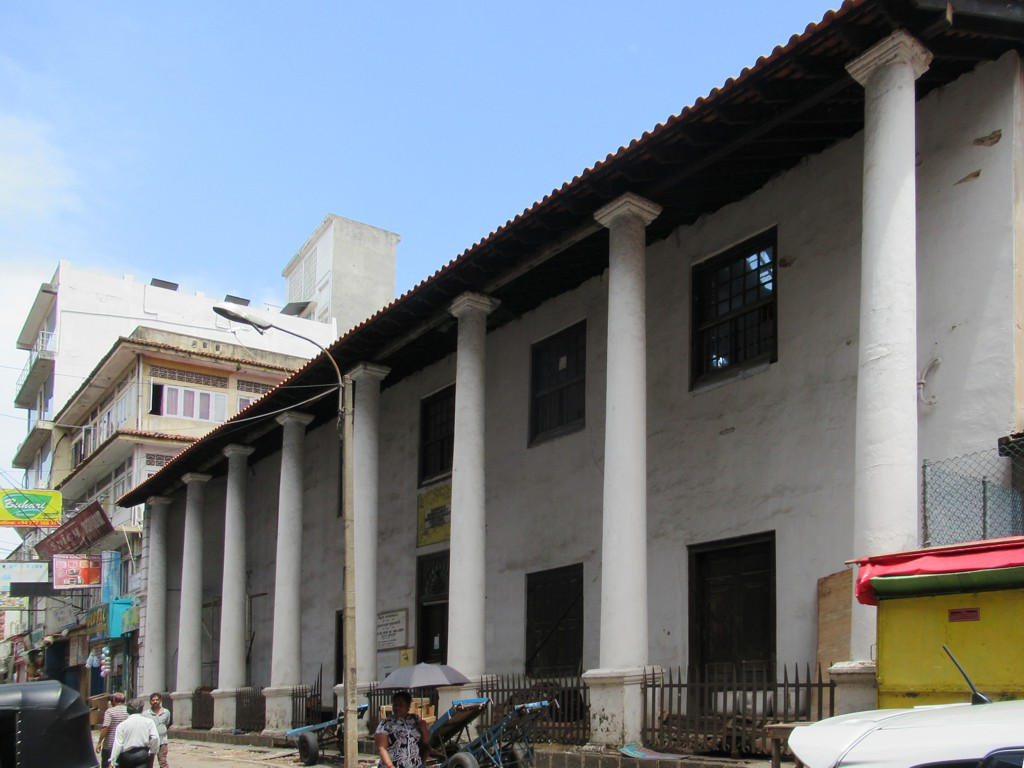
Colombo Dutch Museum

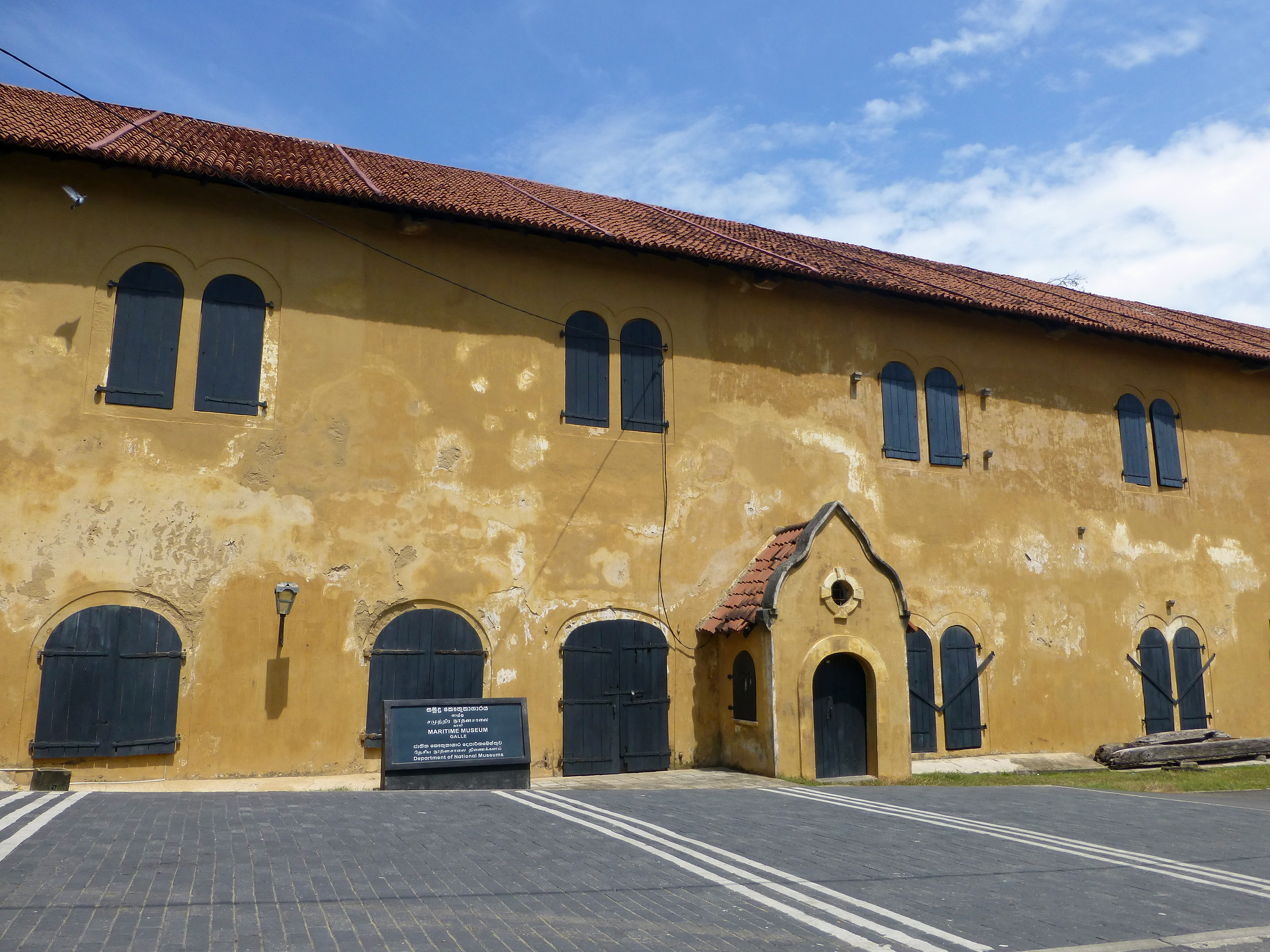
National Maritime Museum or Dutch Warehouse, Galle

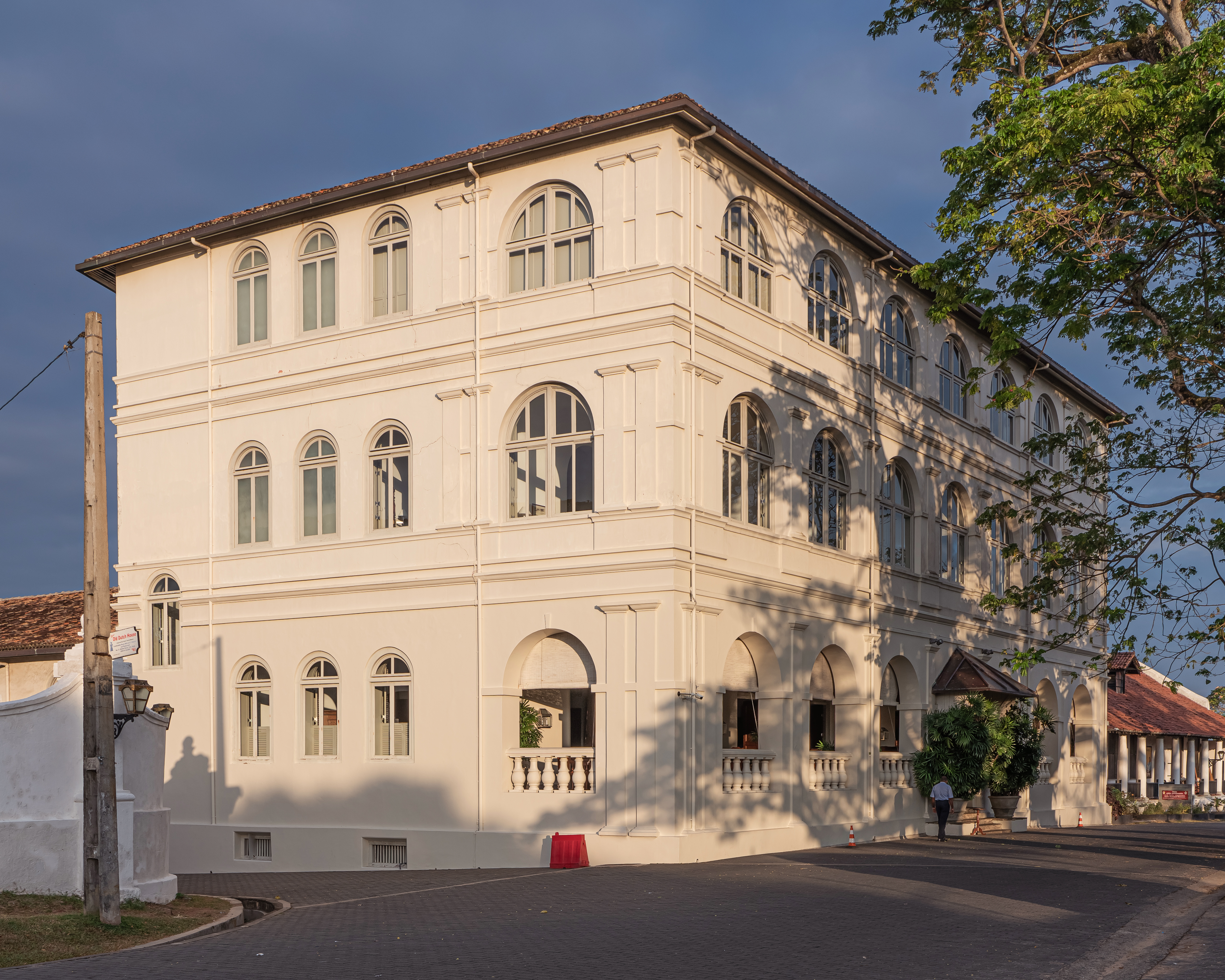
Amangalla, Galle

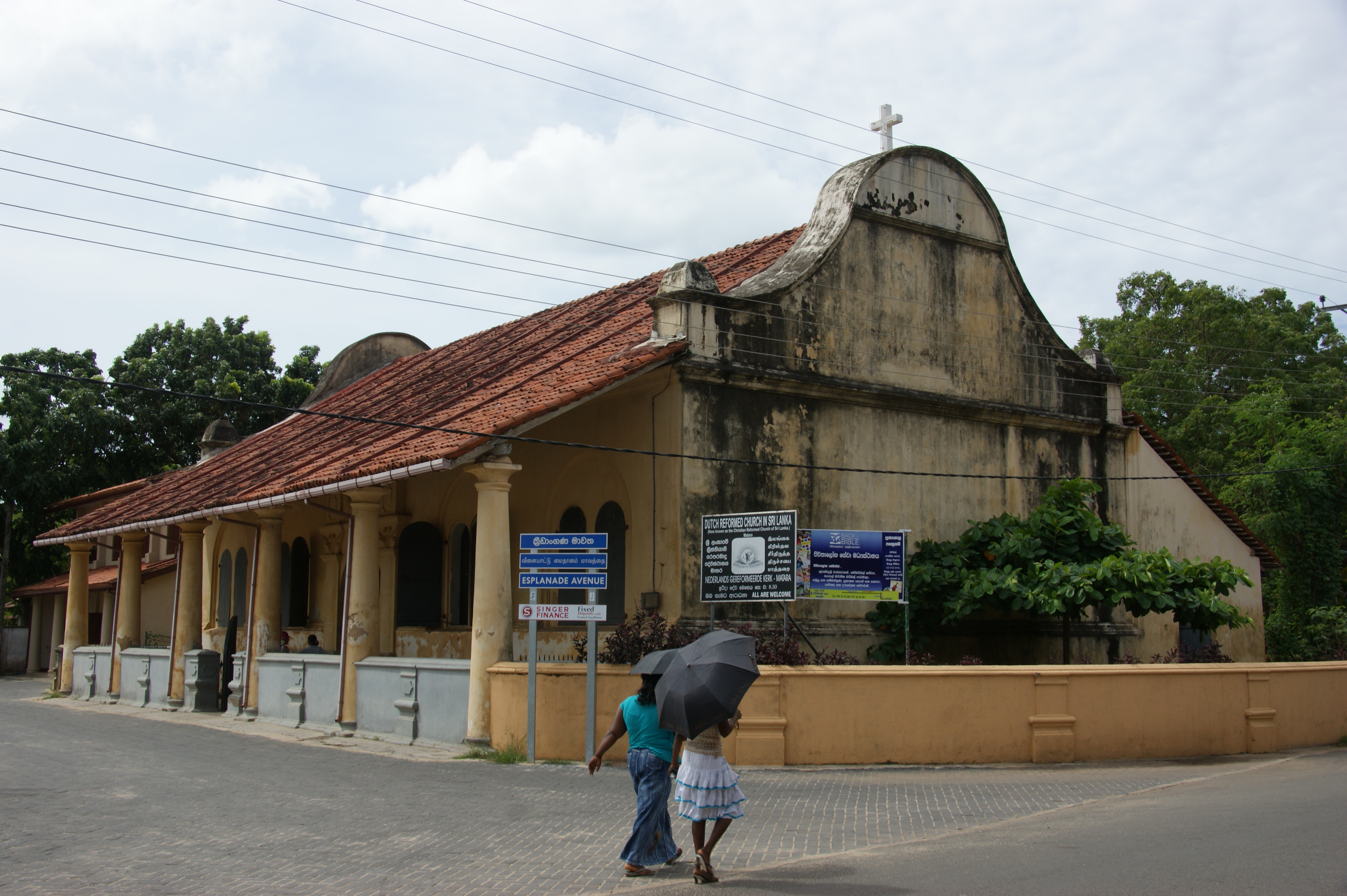
Dutch Reformed Church, Matara, built in 1706

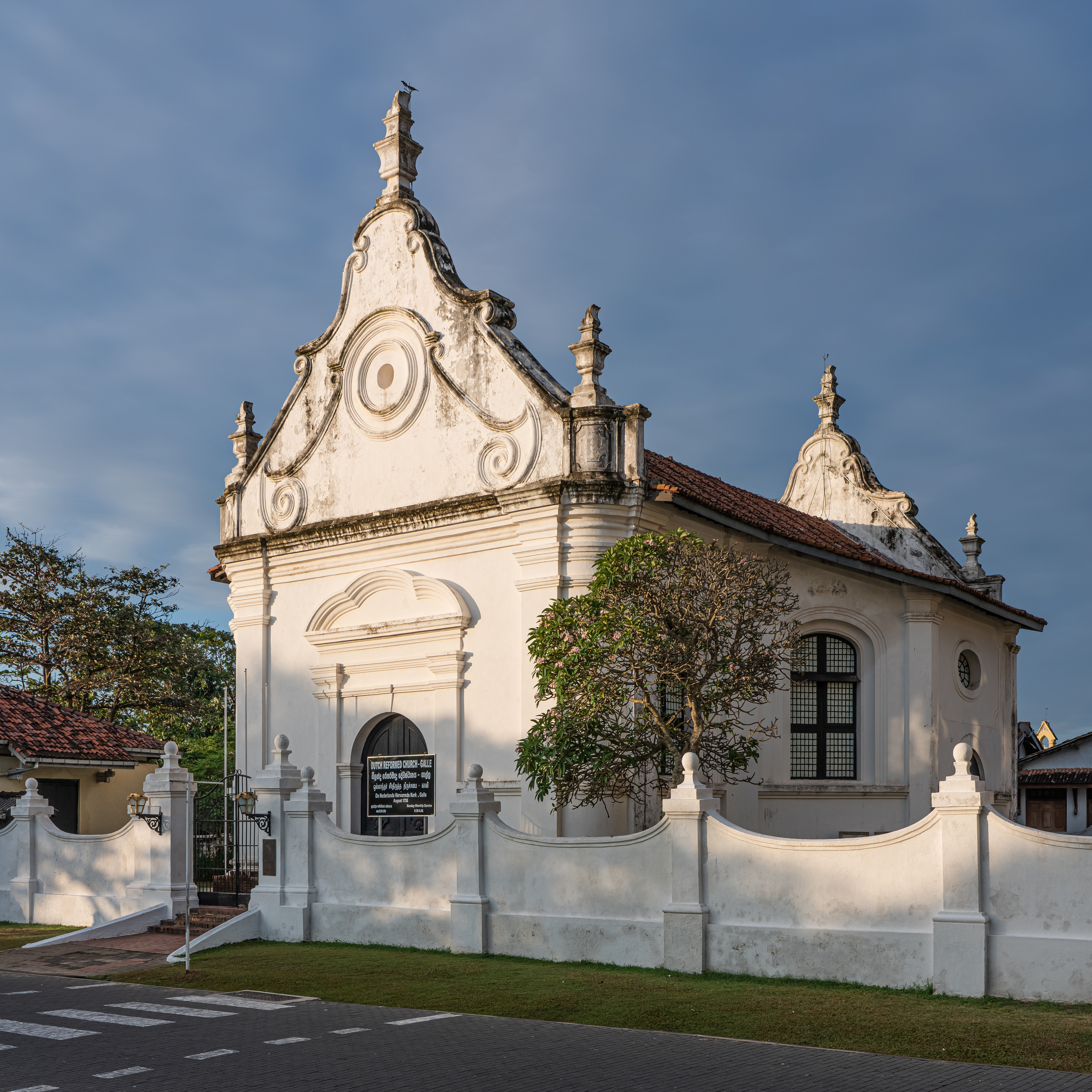
Groote Kerk, Galle

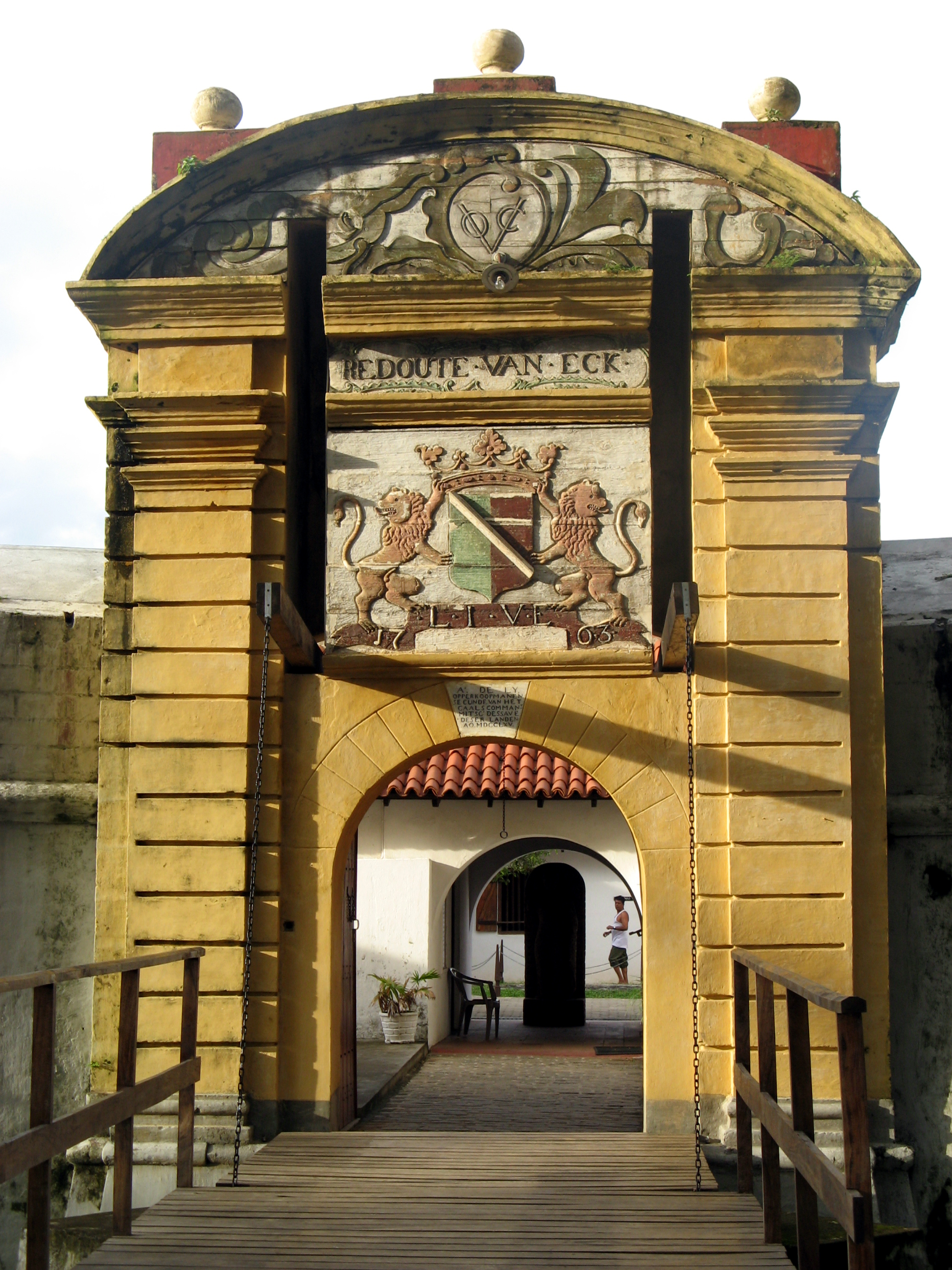
Star Fort, Matara

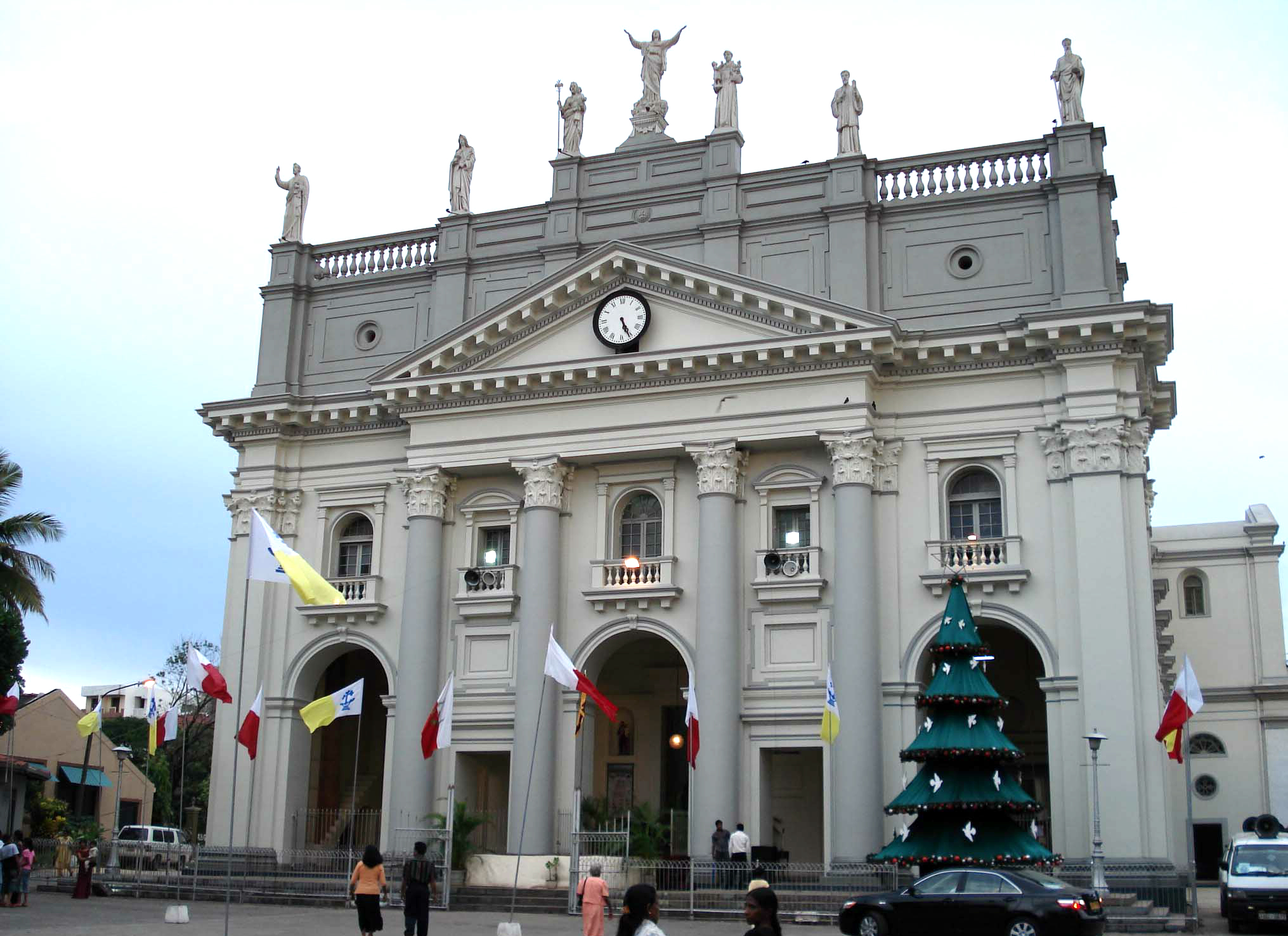
St. Lucia's Cathedral, Colombo

== In South Africa ==
Dutch architecture are found mostly in the Western Cape of South Africa, but modern examples of the style have also been exported as far afield as Western Australia and New Zealand, typically on wine estates. The style was prominent in the early days (17th century) of the Cape Colony, and the name derives from the initial settlers of the Cape being primarily Dutch.

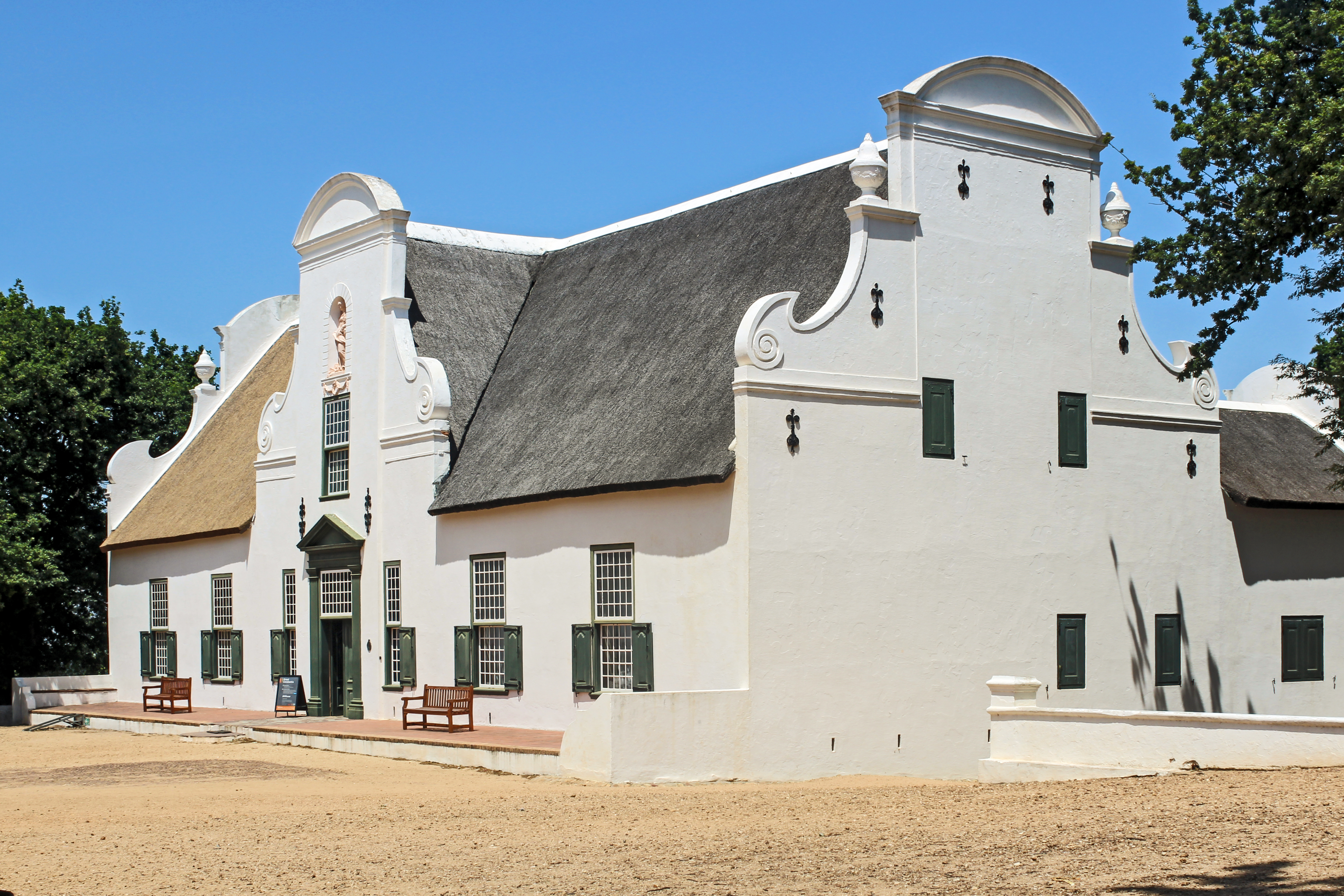
Main house of the Groot Constantia vineyard near Cape Town

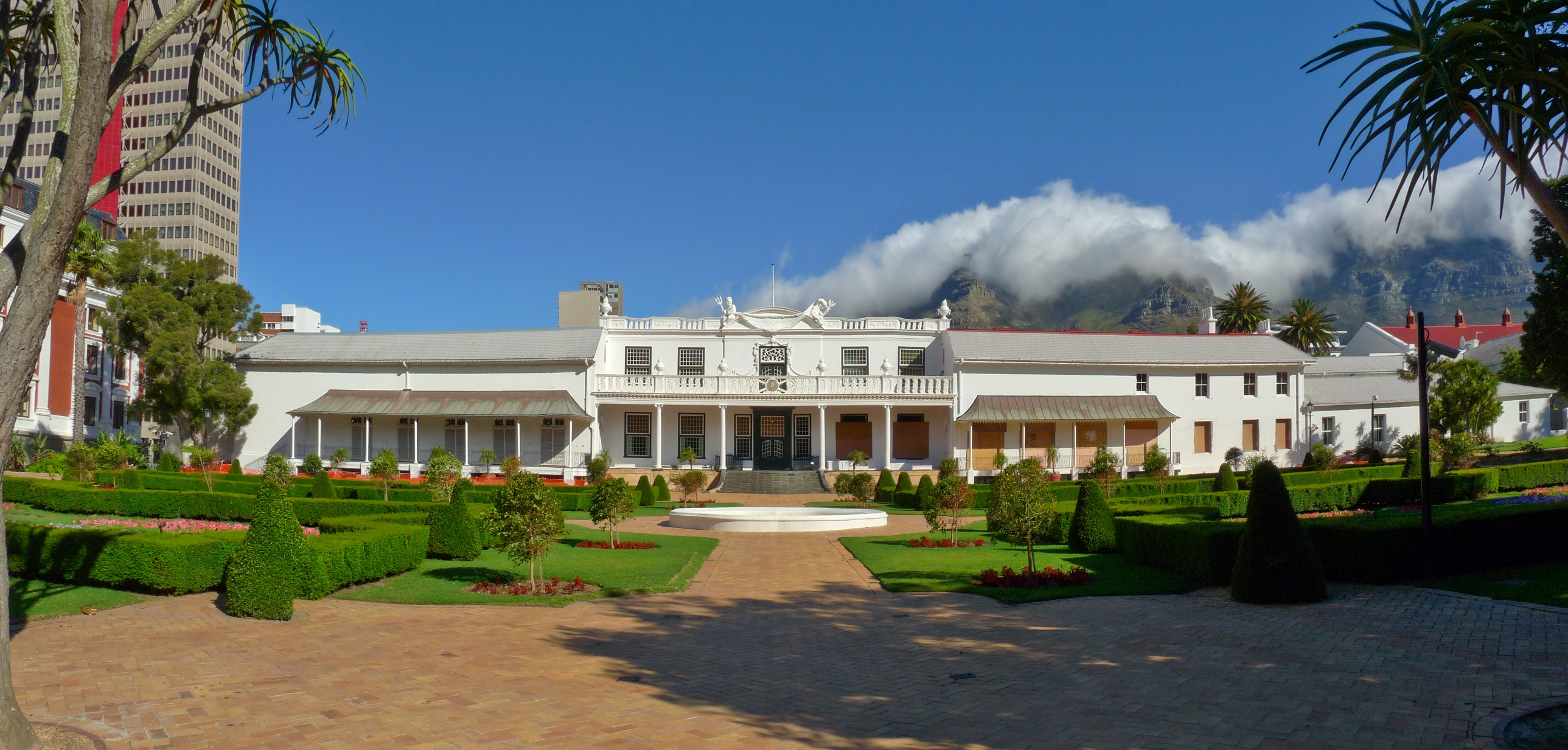
Tuynhuys, Cape Town

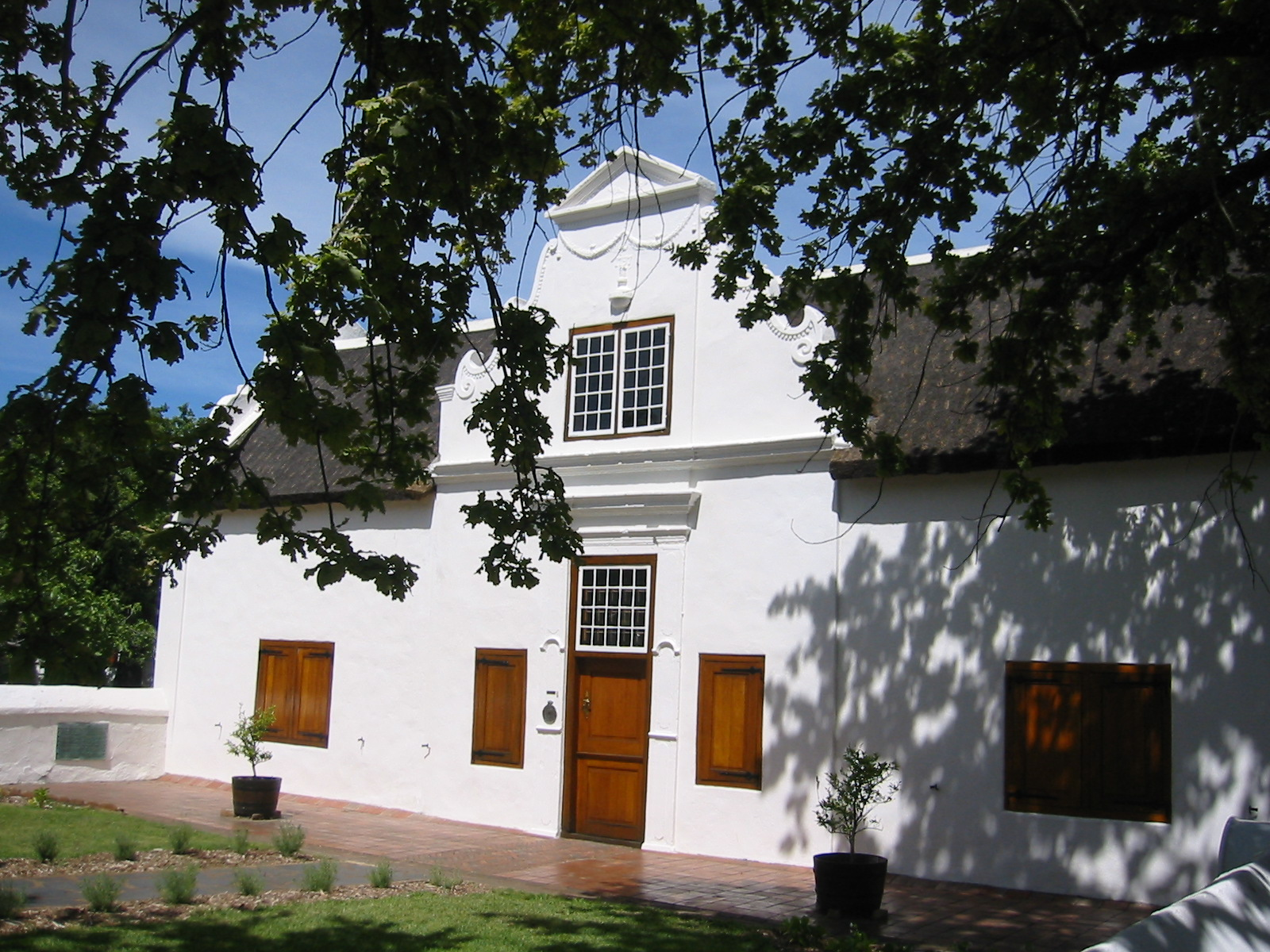
Cape Dutch building in Stellenbosch.

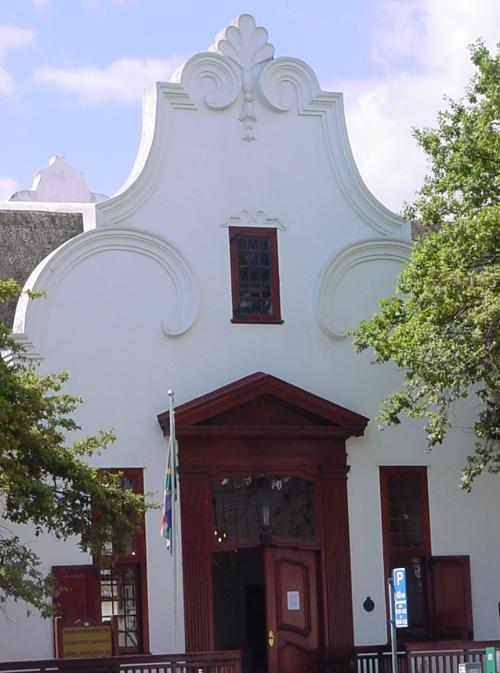
The Stellenbosch office of the Cape Winelands District Municipality

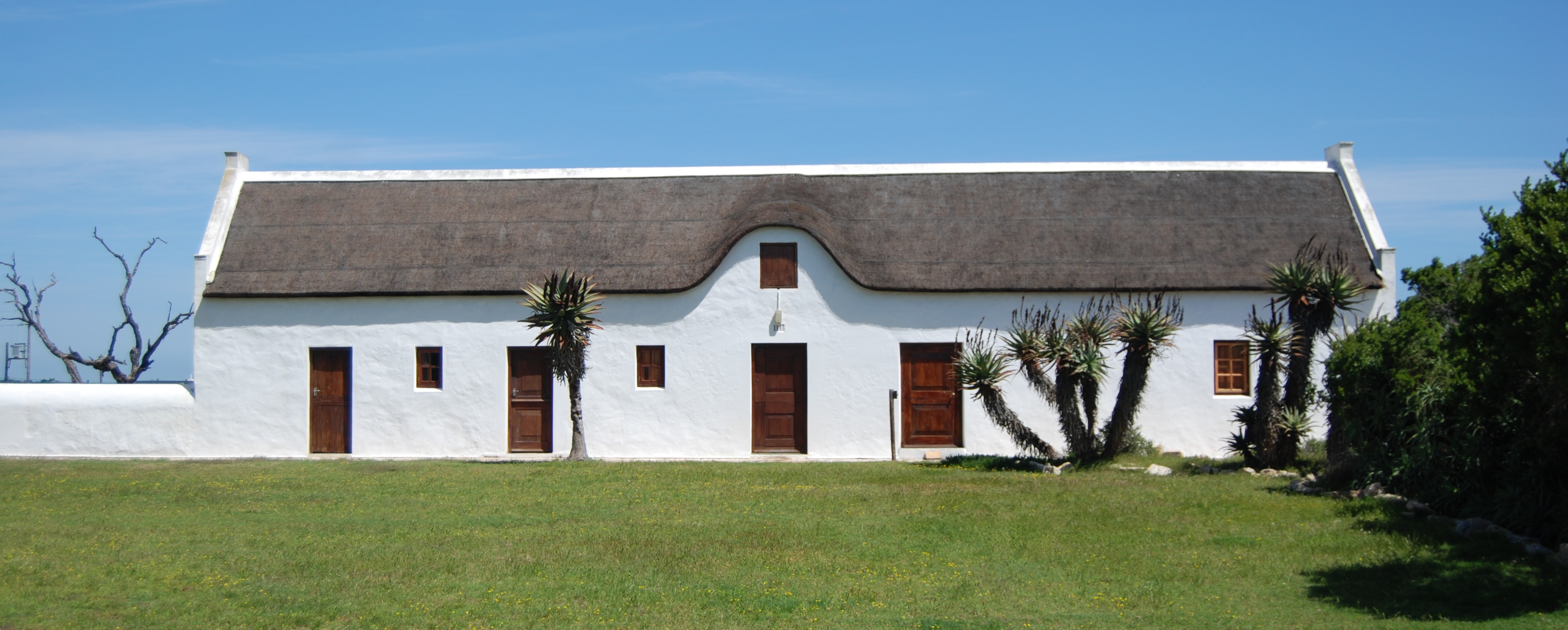
A Cape Dutch homestead at De Hoop

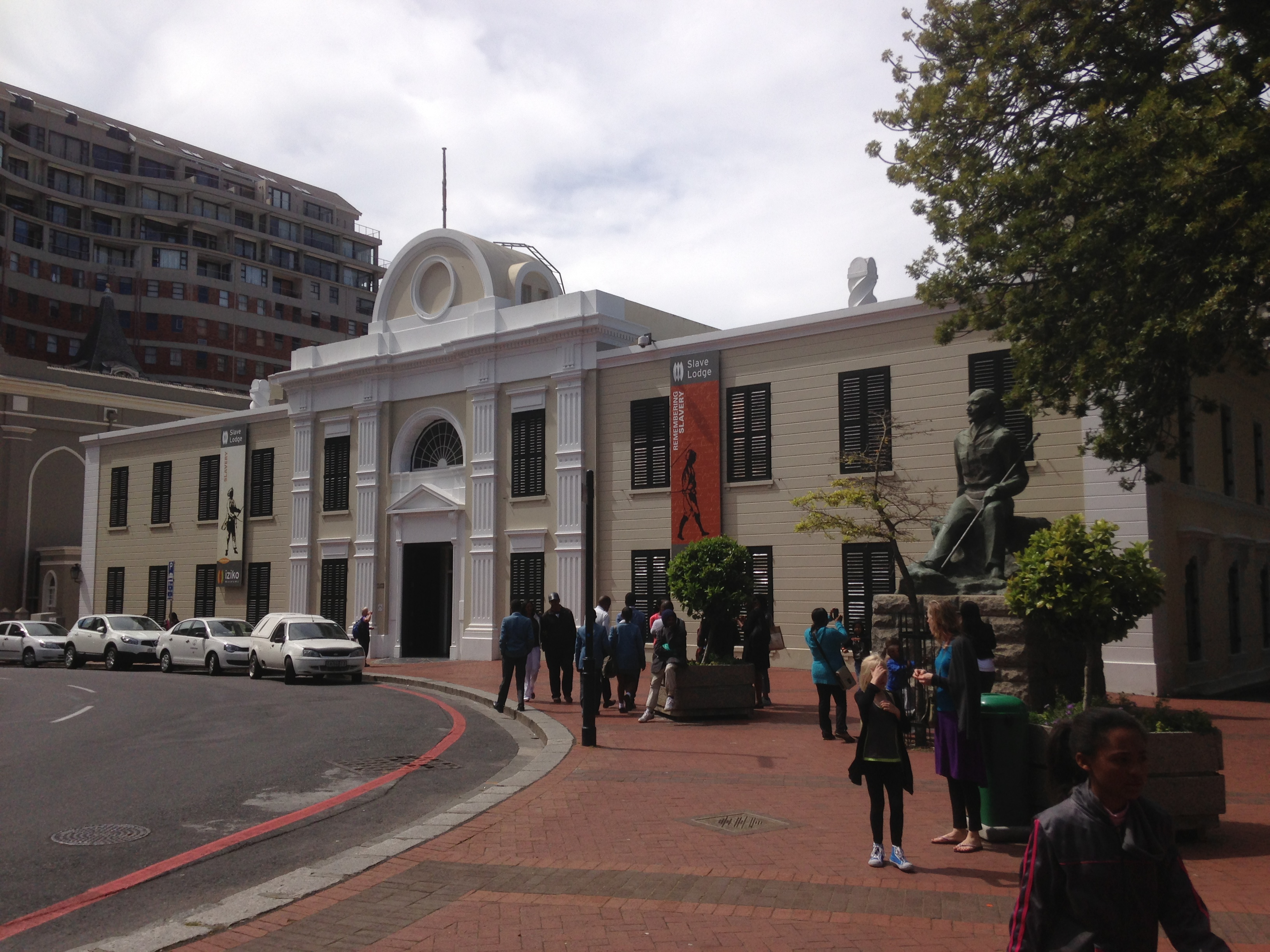
Old Slave Lodge, Cape Town

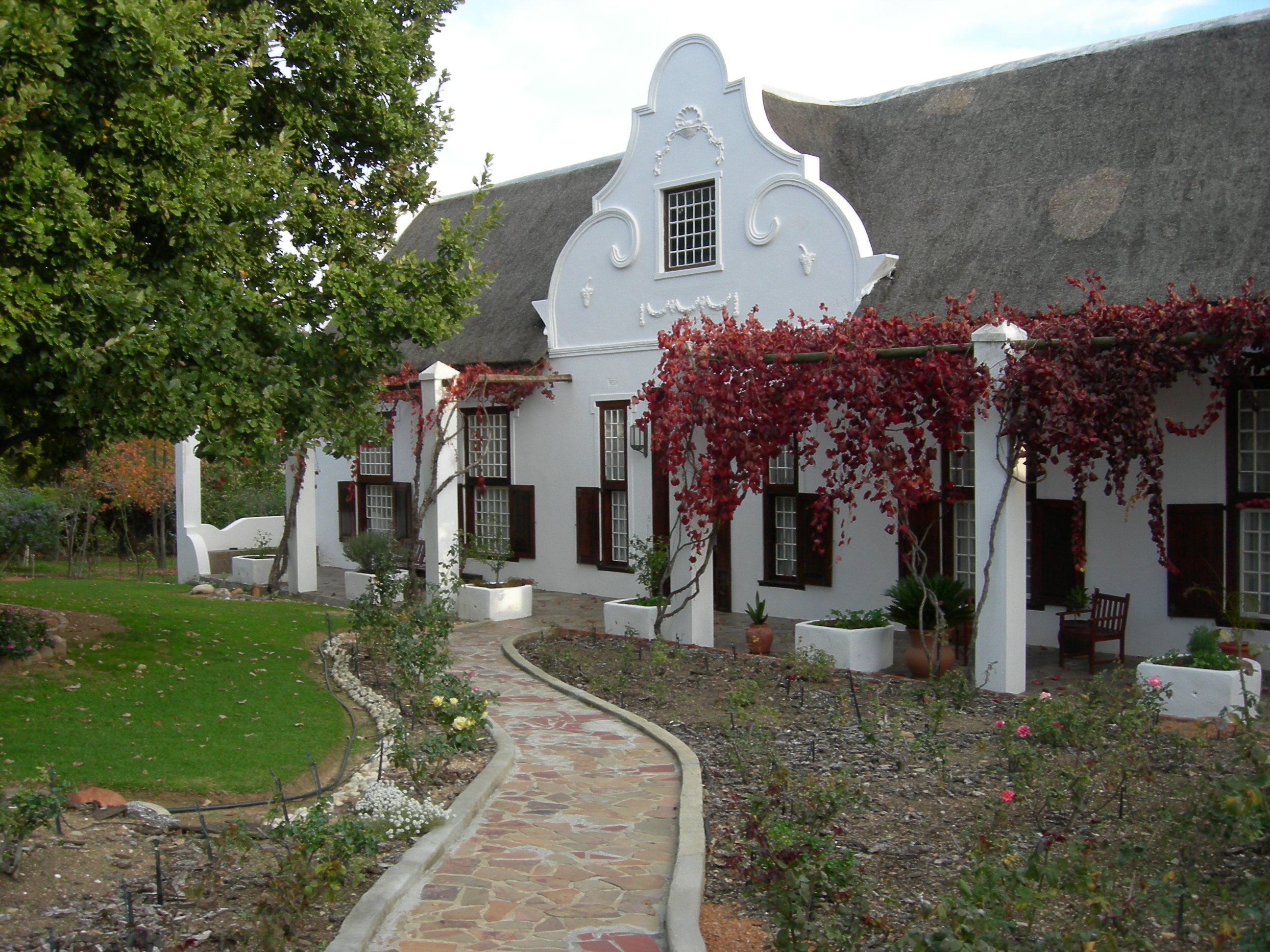
Wittedrift Manor House in Tulbagh

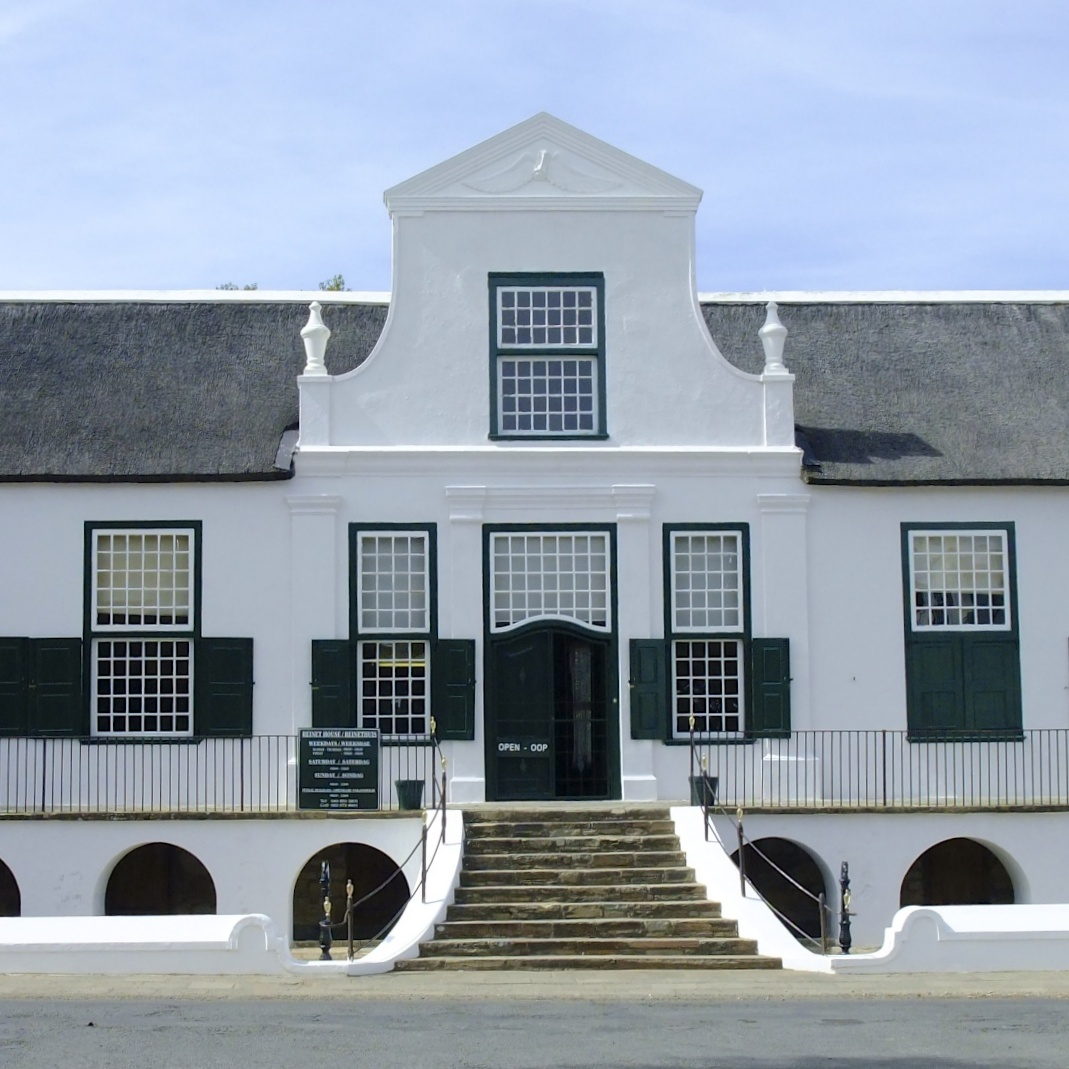
Reinet House in Graaff Reinet

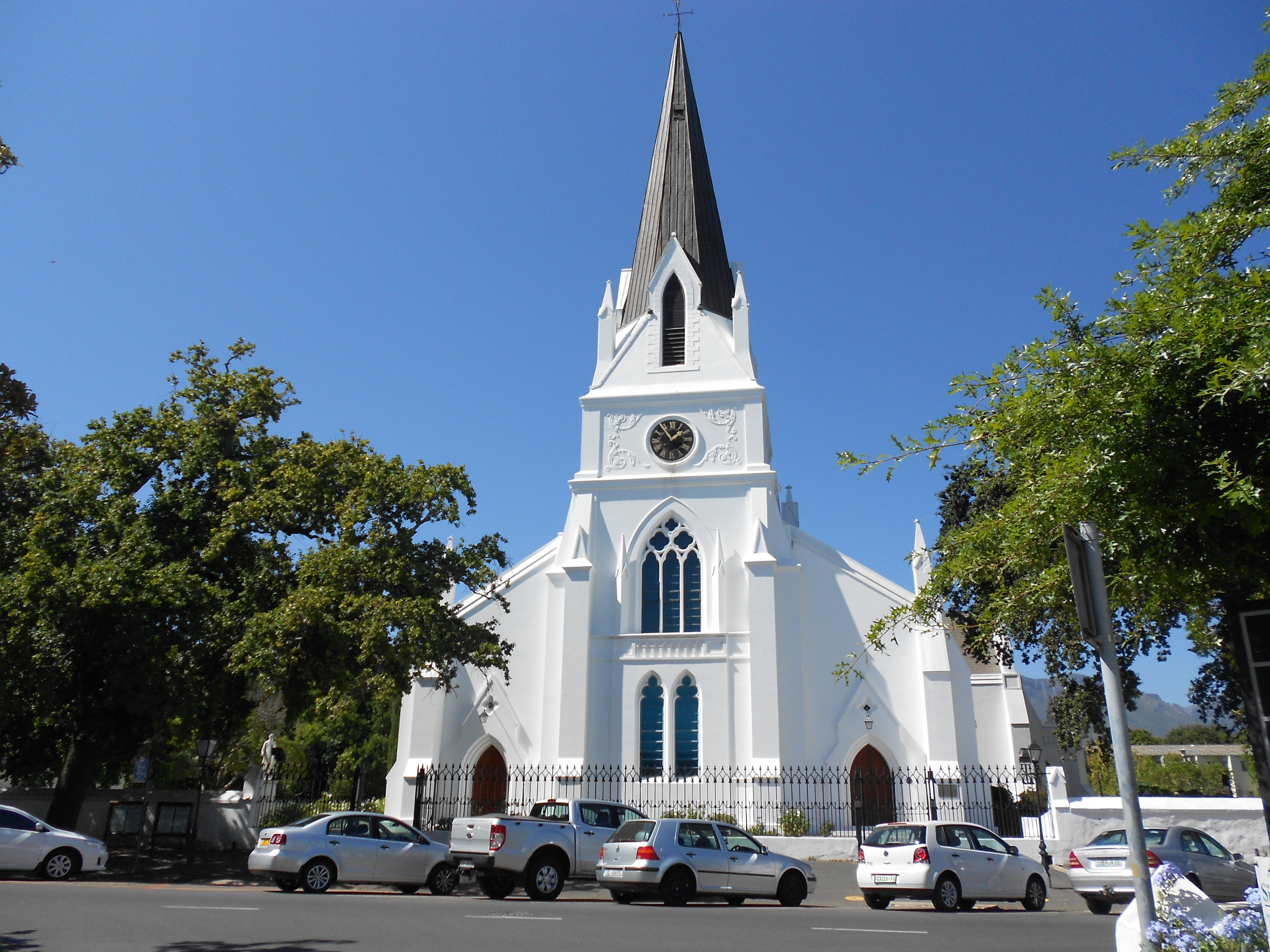
Moederkerk in Stellenbosch

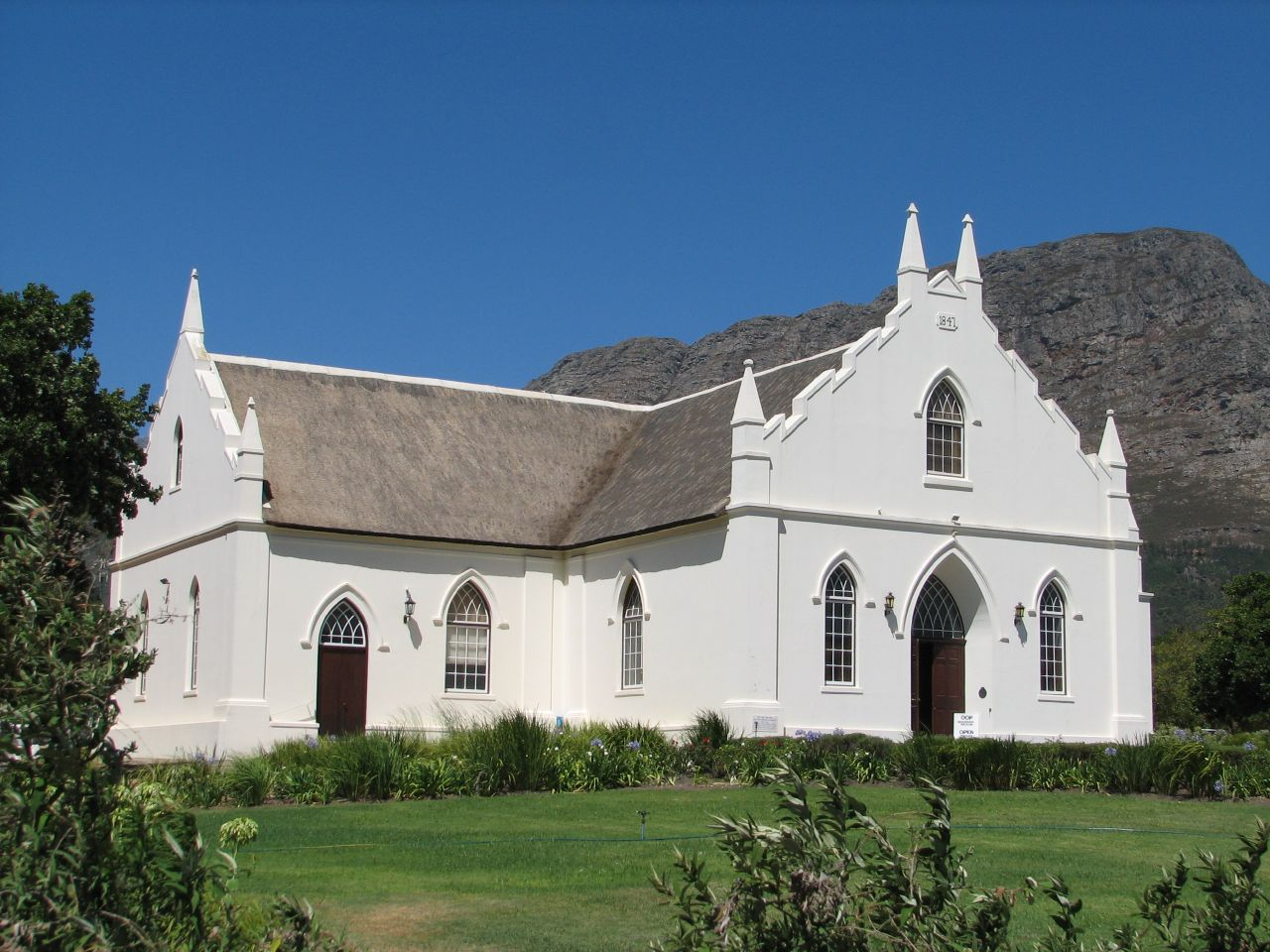
Dutch Reformed Church in Franschhoek, built in 1847

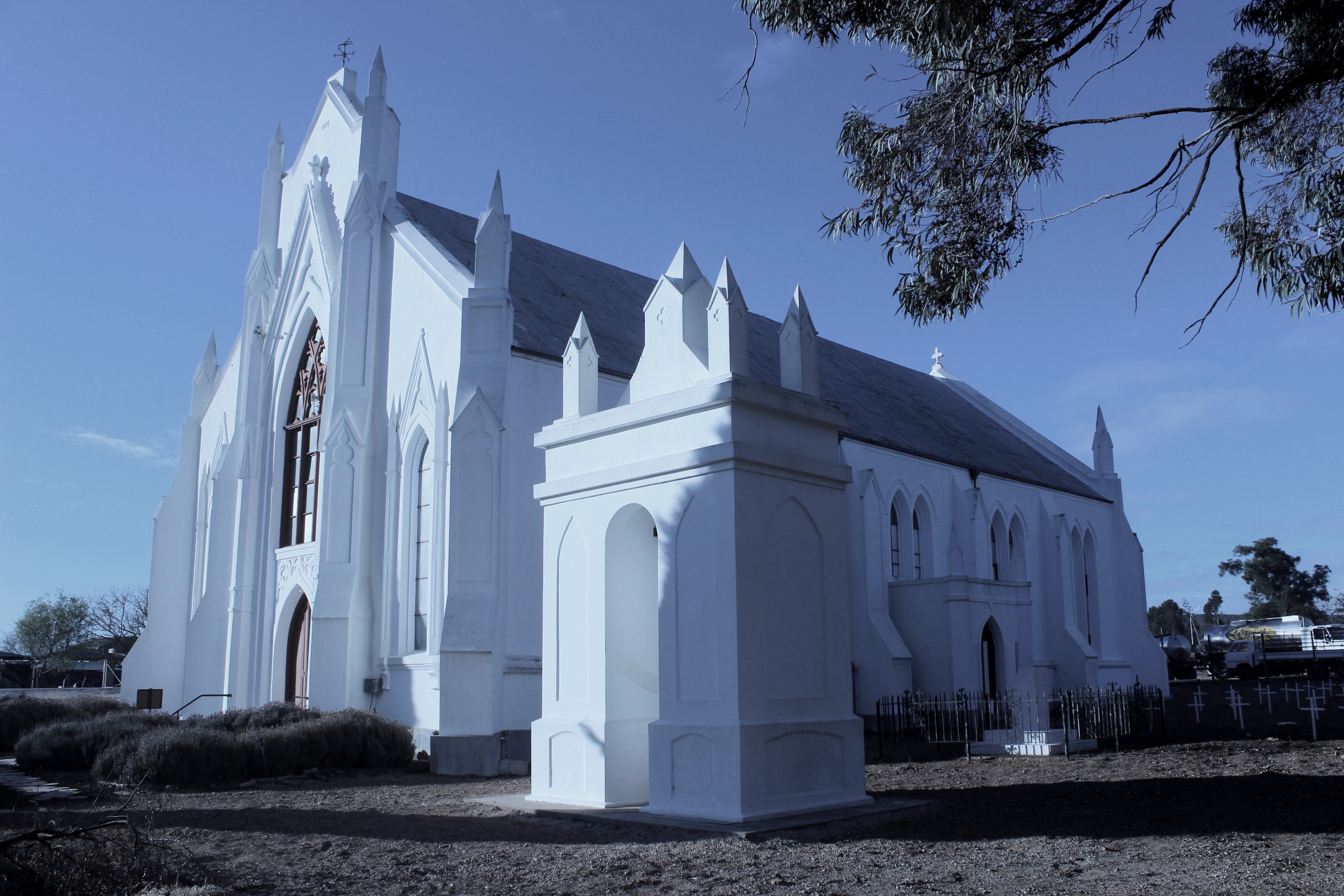
Old Dutch Reformed Church, Ladismith

== See also ==
- Architecture of the Netherlands
- Dutch Colonial Revival architecture
- Colonial architecture of Indonesia
- Cape Dutch architecture
- List of Dutch colonial buildings in Sri Lanka

Other colonial architecture

- French colonial architecture
- Portuguese colonial architecture
- Spanish colonial architecture
