= Timeline of Surabaya =

The following is a timeline of the history of the city of Surabaya, Indonesia.

== Prior to 19th century ==
- 1037 – An inscription mentioned Airlangga having built dams on the Brantas River and developed the port of Hujung Galuh, which is located on or near present-day Surabaya.
- 1275 – According to some accounts, Surabaya was founded by Kertanegara of Singhasari.
- 31 May 1293 – Raden Wijaya and his Javanese army defeated Mongol soldiers in a battle, with the date celebrated as the city's anniversary.
- 1614–1625 – Mataram conquest of Surabaya, which culminated in the surrender of the city to the Mataram Sultanate.
- 1617 – The Dutch East India Company established a lodge in Surabaya.
- 4–13 May 1677 – Dutch forces took the city during the Trunajaya rebellion.
- 1717–1723 – Surabaya rebelled against the VOC.
- July 1741 – Chinese residents of the city were massacred during a wave of violence against ethnic Chinese following the 1740 Batavia massacre.
- 1743 – A Dutch settlement was established in Surabaya.

== 19th century ==
- 1808 – Governor-General Herman Willem Daendels established the Constructie Winkel - an arms factory that precedes modern-day Pindad - in Surabaya.
- 22 March 1822 – The old building of the Church of the Birth of Our Lady, Surabaya was consecrated.
- 1836 – The Soerabaijasch Advertentieblad, the first newspaper in Surabaya, began publication.
- 1845 – Dutch authorities completed the construction of the Prins Hendrik Fort, meant to fortify the city.
- 1871 – Surabaya's city walls were demolished to make way for the city's growth.
- 1878 – The city's first railway, a 115 kilometres (71 mi) track connecting it to Pasuruan, was opened.
- 1889–1891 – During this period, steam trams were introduced to Surabaya.
- 1895
  - The Prins Hendrik Fort was dismantled.
  - Students from the Hoogere Burger School established Victoria, the first football club in the city.

== 20th century ==
=== 1900s-1930s ===
- 5 August 1900 – The present building of the Church of the Birth of Our Lady, Surabaya completed construction.
- 1 April 1906 – Surabaya's city council was established, composed of 15 Europeans, 3 natives, and 3 Chinese/Arabs.
- 1910 – Work began on the construction of a modern port at Tanjung Perak.
- 1913 – The Nederlandsch-Indische Artsen School/NIAS (Surabaya Medical college) was founded.
- 31 August 1916 – The Surabaya Zoo was first founded as the Soerabaiasche Planten-en Dierentuin.
- 1917 – The Indies Social Democratic Association (ISDV) organized sailors and soldiers into "soviets" mimicking the Russian Revolution, though the movement was suppressed in the following years.
- 1925
  - Morokrembangan Naval Air Base, a Dutch Air Base, was established.
  - September–December – Extensive strikes in Surabaya's engineering companies, culminating with the banning of Surabaya's railway workers' union.
- 18 June 1927 – The Soerabajasche Indonesische Voetbalbond (today Persebaya) was established.
- 1930 – Surabaya's population was recorded to be 341,700.
- 1935 – The radio station Chineese en Inheemse Radio Luisteraars Vereniging Oost Java (CIRVO) began broadcasting.

=== 1940s ===
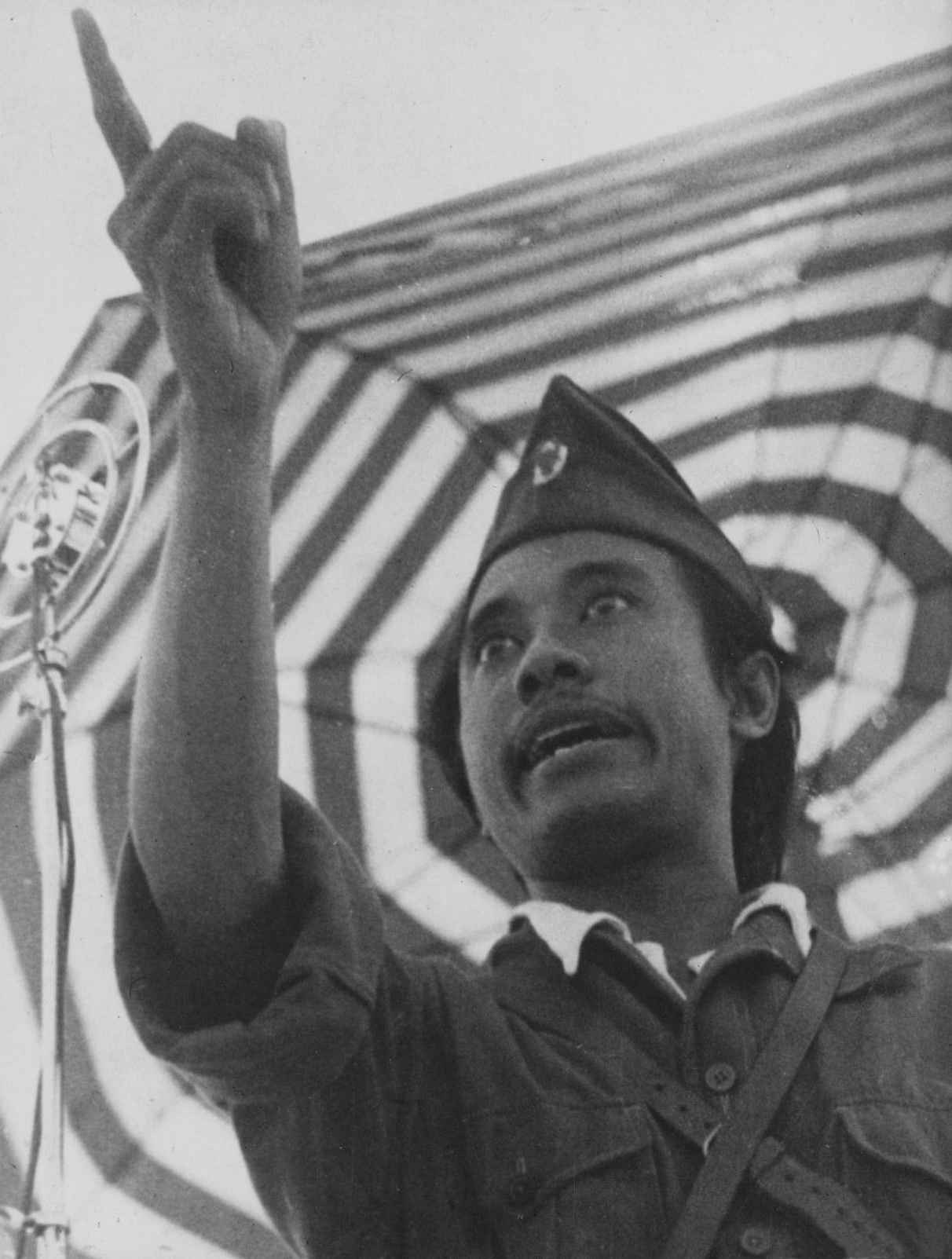
Revolutionary leader Sutomo, in Surabaya

- 1942
  - 3 February – First Japanese air strike against the city.
  - 18 February – Dutch coastal defense ship HNLMS Soerabaja and submarine HNLMS K VII were sunk by Japanese bombers in Surabaya harbor.
  - 1 March – The Imperial Japanese Army—the 48th Division and part of the 156th Mixed Infantry Brigade—invaded East Java, with Surabaya as the primary objective. The Dutch surrender was signed before fighting occurred in the city.
- 17 May 1944 – Operation Transom – American and British bombers raided Surabaya.
- 1945
  - 17 August – Immediately following the proclamation of Indonesian independence, the Japanese occupation government handed over the governing of the city to Indonesians, with Radjamin Nasution becoming the city's first Indonesian mayor.
  - 19 September – The "Flag Incident" or "Yamato Hotel Incident": Indonesian nationalist youths tore off the blue portion of the Dutch flag flown by the Yamato Hotel, changing it to the Indonesian flag.
  - 3 October – Vice Admiral Shibata Yaichiro, the most senior Japanese commander in Surabaya, surrendered to allied representatives.
  - 30 October – British Indian Army officer Aubertin Walter Sothern Mallaby was killed in his car.
  - 10 November – British forces attacked the city supported by naval and aerial bombardment, in what is today commemorated in Indonesia as Heroes' Day.
- 1 July 1949 – Jawa Pos began publication in Surabaya.

=== 1950s-1990s ===
- 10 November 1954 – The Airlangga University was established.
- 10 November 1957 – The Sepuluh Nopember Institute of Technology was inaugurated by Sukarno.
- 4 April 1960 – The Morokrembangan Aviation Base was reinaugurated as the Morokrembangan Naval Air Base.
- 19 December 1964 – IKIP Surabaya (today State University of Surabaya) was established.
- 1965
  - 16 October – Following the 30 September Movement, organized attacks began on the Indonesian Communist Party members and locations in Surabaya.
  - 29 October – Communist-affiliated mayor Moerachman was removed from his post and replaced by local army district commander Soekotjo Sastrodinoto.
- 26 August–6 September 1969 – The 7th Pekan Olahraga Nasional was held in Surabaya.
- 1979 – Moehadji Widjaja was elected mayor.
- 1984 – Poernomo Kasidi was elected mayor.
- 1986
  - The first Tunjungan Plaza was opened.
  - The Surabaya–Gempol Toll Road was opened.
- 16 June 1989 – The Surabaya Stock Exchange was established.
- 24 August 1990 - SCTV, Indonesia's second private television network, began airing from Surabaya.
- 1993 – The Surabaya–Gresik Toll Road began operations.
- 1994
  - The Surabaya Stock Exchange began operations.
  - Soenarto Soemoprawiro was elected mayor.

== 21st century ==
=== 2000s ===
- 2000
  - Surabaya's population was recorded during the 2000 census to be 2,610,519.
  - 19–30 June – The 15th Pekan Olahraga Nasional was held in Surabaya.
  - 10 November – The Al-Akbar Mosque was inaugurated.
- 16 January 2002 – Sunarto Sumoprawiro was removed from his position and was replaced by his deputy, Bambang Dwi Hartono.
- 27 June 2005 – First direct mayoral election for the city resulted in Bambang Dwi Hartono's continuation as mayor.
- 10 June 2009 – The Suramadu Bridge, connecting Surabaya and the island of Madura, was opened.

=== 2010s ===
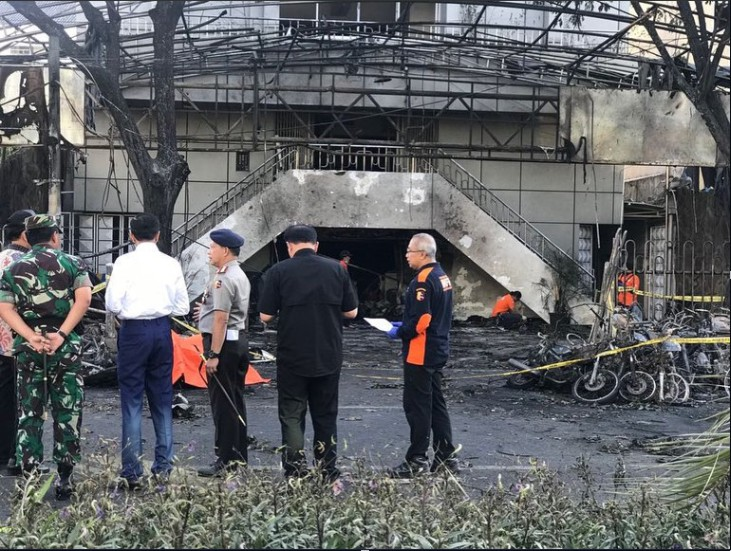
A bombed church in Surabaya, 2018

- 2010
  - Surabaya's population was recorded during the 2010 census to be 2,765,487.
  - 6 August – The Gelora Bung Tomo Stadium was opened.
  - 28 September – Tri Rismaharini becomes mayor of Surabaya.
- 2012
  - Surabaya's population was recorded 3,110,187 by Municipality of Surabaya.
- 2015
  - Tri Rismaharini was reelected as mayor with a landslide victory.
- 2018
  - 13–14 May – A series of suicide bombings attacking churches and a police station kills 28 people (including 13 attackers) and injures 57.
  - 20 December – President Joko Widodo inaugurates final segments of the Trans-Java Toll Road, fully connecting Jakarta and Surabaya.
- 2021
  - 26 February – Eri Cahyadi becomes mayor of Surabaya.
- 2024
  - 27 November – Eri Cahyadi was reelected mayor unopposed.
