= APEKSI =

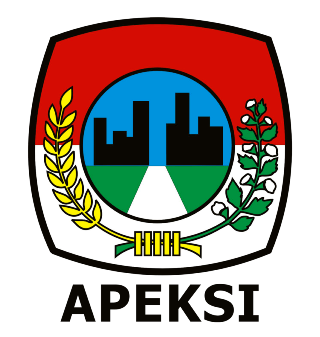
APEKSI Logo

APEKSI, the Asosiasi Pemerintah Kota Seluruh Indonesia or Association of the Indonesia Municipalities is a representative for all 98 cities in Indonesia and aims to empower and promote city autonomy, sustainable development, and the establishment of smart cities.

- APEKSI collaborates with various stakeholders to enhance administrative capacities. Its goal is to foster prosperous and inclusive cities by facilitating collaboration and knowledge-sharing.
- APEKSI advocates for regulatory policies and strives for a brighter future for Indonesian cities and residents.

Established on 25 May 2000. By Act No. 22 Year 1999 on Local Government and Presidential Decree No. 49 Year 2000 on the Establishment of Dewan Pertimbangan Otonomi Daerah (DPOD) or Regional Autonomy Advisory Council, Ministry of Home Affairs and Regional Autonomy issued Decree No. 16 Year 2000 on the Establishment of Local Government Association and Elections of Deputy Local Government Association as Members DPOD. The decision of Ministry of Home Affairs and Regional Autonomy No. 16 Year 2000 is structured to develop the City Government Association, Regency Government Association and Provincial Government Association is truly independent and will be represented in DPOD.

== History ==
In line with the new policy on regional autonomy, members of Badan Kerja Sama Antar Kota Seluruh Indonesia (BKS-AKSI) or Indonesia Inter City Cooperation Agency, at that time under the Jakarta provincial government held a National Meeting/Summit of Mayors all over Indonesia in Jakarta, on May 24, 2000 and agreed to dissolve the BKS-AKSI.

On May 25, 2000, the National Meeting of Mayors all over Indonesia in Jakarta formed a "Working Committee of the Mayor" to consider and make recommendations on the establishment of the "Association of the Cities" which eventually was named the Asosiasi Pemerintah Kota Seluruh Indonesia (Apeksi) or Association of Indonesia Municipalities (AIM). Apeksi is a container that is formed by the City Government which aims to help its members to expedite the implementation of regional autonomy and create a climate that is conducive to cooperation among the regional governments. In addition to the above objectives, Apeksi also aims to promote the interests of members of the Dewan Pertimbangan Otonomi Daerah (DOPD) or Regional Autonomy Advisory Council immortalized in order to accelerate the increase in the welfare of society through democracy, participation, justice, and equality that takes into account the potential and diversity of the regions. This committee held a formal meeting on 13–14 June 2000 and the proposal was submitted at a meeting of the mayors held in late June 2000.

Musyawarah Nasional (Munas) or National Assembly I Apeksi, on 22–23 June 2000 in Surabaya City, finalize and approve the Statutes and Bylaws Apeksi. The board and Executive Director were selected. The mayor of Surabaya H. Sunarto Sumoprawiro elected as Chairman of the Board and a representative of the Local Government Association who sits on DPOD. The National Assembly also agreed on several things, including the amounts of fees and Apeksi Work Program 2000-2004.

Along with time, Apeksi has undergone several changes, among them the number of member cities and stewardship. Currently, Apeksi consists of 98 municipalities. In addition, through the Munas II in Surabaya City set Mayor of Tarakan, dr. H. Jusuf Serang Kasim as Chairperson of the Board of Apeksi 2004-2008. Then Apeksi Munas III on 22–24 July 2008 in Surakarta City decided the formation of Composition of Board of Apeksi period 2008-2012. Chairperson of the Board of Apeksi the 2008-2012 period held by the Mayor of Palembang, Ir. H. Eddy Santana Putra, MT. Furthermore, Munas IV on May 30 - June 2, 2012 in Manado City confirmed Mayor of Manado, Dr. Ir. G.S. Vicky Lumentut, SH., MSi., DEA as Chairperson of the Board of APEKSI the period 2012-2016. Apeksi Munas V 26–28 July 2016 in the Jambi City solidified Mayor of South Tangerang Hj. Airin Rachmi Diany, SH., MH. as Chairperson of the Board APEKSI period 2016-2020. In Apeksi Munas VI 11 February 2021 in Jakarta solidified Mayor of Bogor Dr. H. Bima Arya Sugiarto as Chairperson of the Board APEKSI period 2021-2024, inaugurated by the Minister of Home Affairs, Police General (Ret.) Prof. Drs. H. Muhammad Tito Karnavian, M.A., Ph.D. The Extraordinary Munas with the theme, Consistency in the Transition Period, was implemented for the continuity of the Board by the Law relating to Regional Elections, held on 14-15 December 2023. The Mayor of Surabaya, Eri Cahyadi, S.T., M.T. was elected as Chairperson of Board for the 2023-2025 Period which was inaugurated by the Secretary General of the Ministry of Home Affairs, Dr. H. Suhajar Diantoro, M.Sc. In Munas VII with theme From APEKSI For Indonesia on 6-10 May 2025 in Surabaya City, Mayor of Surabaya, Dr. Eri Cahyadi, S.T., M.T. was elected again as Chairperson of Board for the 2025-2030 Periode which inaugurated by Komjen. Pol. Drs. Tomsi Tohir, M.Si., Secretary General of the Ministry of Home Affairs.

Since its inception in 2000, Apeksi has taken a major role in helping the city members. Cities now have the opportunity to initiate the formation of the Association at the national level which is truly democratic autonomy. Apeksi organization was designed to meet the needs of that required the cities (members). To assist this purpose, organizational forms and ideas about the role and scope of activities that may be carried Apeksi can also be arranged by the Local Government Association experience already established and proven success at the international level.

== Chairpersons of Apeksi ==
No.	Picture	Name	Start	End	Information
1		Soenarto Soemoprawiro	2000	2002	
2		Jusuf Serang Kasim	2002	2004	Replace Soenarto Soemoprawiro in 2002 and elected as Chairperson of APEKSI ini 2004
3		Jusuf Serang Kasim	2004	2028	
4		Eddy Santana Putra	2008	2012	
5		Vicky Lumentut	2012	2016	
6		Airin Rachmi Diany	2016	2021	
7		Bima Arya Sugiarto	2021	2024	The 2023 Extraordinary National Meeting/ Assembly is being held for the continuity of board with the end of the term of period in accordance with the Law relating to Regional Elections
8		Eri Cahyadi	2023	2025	
9		Eri Cahyadi	2025	2030	

== National Board Period of 2025-2030 ==
Board:

1. Chairperson: Dr. Eri Cahyadi, S.T., M.T./Walikota Surabaya
2. Vice Chairperson of Government and Autonomy: Eva Dwiana, S.E./Mayor of Bandar Lampung
3. Vice Chairperson of Development and Social Welfare: Ika Puspitasati, S.E./Mayor of Mojokerto
4. Vice Chairperson of Urban and Cultures: I Gusti Ngurah Jaya Negara, S.E./Mayor of Denpasar
5. Vice Chairperson of Cooperation: Achmad Afzan Arslan Djunaid, S.E./Mayor of Pekalongan
6. Vice Chairperson of Law and Advocacy: M Ramlan Nurmatias, S.H./Mayor of Bukittinggi
7. Vice Chairperson of Information: dr. Khairul, M.Kes./Mayor of Tarakan
8. Vice Chairperson of Inclusive and Human Rights: Dr. M. Tauhid Soleman, M.Si./Mayor of Ternate
9. Vice Chairperson of Economy and Finance: Munafri Arifuddin, S.H./Mayor of Makassar
10. Vice Chairperson of Smart City Acceleration: Respati A Ardianto, S.H., M.Kn./Mayor of Surakarta
11. Vice Chairperson of Environment and Climate Change: Illiza Sa'aduddin Djamal, S.E./Mayor of Banda Aceh
12. Secretary: Alwis Rustam, M.A. (International Development)/Executive Director
13. Treasury: dr. Neni Moerniaeni, Sp.OG./Mayor of Bontang

Supervisory:

1. Chairperson: Tjhai Chui Mie, S.H., M.H./Mayor of Singkawang
2. Member: Andrei Angouw, S.E./Mayor of Manado

== Chairperson of Regional Commissariat I-VI ==
APEKSI Membership is divided into 6 regional commissariats based on geographical location in Indonesia and each has a board led by the chairperson.

1. Regional Commissariat I: Rico Tri Putra Bayu Waas/Walikota Medan
2. Regional Commissariat II: Dr. dr. Maulana, M.K.M./Walikota Jambi
3. Regional Commissariat III: M. Farhan, S.E./Walikota Bandung
4. Regional Commissariat IV: Dr. Ir. Wahyu Hidayat, M.M./Walikota Mojokerto
5. Regional Commissariat V: Ir, Edi Rusdi Kamtono, M.M., M.T./Walikota Pontianak
6. Regional Commissariat VI: dr. Siska Karina Imran, SKM./Walikota Kendari

== Components ==
Component and Program mandatory of 7th 2025 National Assembly in Surabaya City.

1. Policy Advocacy
2. Sustainable Development
3. Capacity Building
4. Institutional and Partnership
5. Communication Program & Knowledge Management
6. Strategic Communications

== Members ==
98 Cities in Indonesia with 93 autonomy cities and 5 administrative cities in Province of Jakarta, members of Apeksi:

1. Ambon
2. Balikpapan
3. Banda Aceh
4. Bandar Lampung
5. Bandung
6. Banjar
7. Banjarbaru
8. Banjarmasin
9. Batam
10. Batu
11. Baubau
12. Bekasi
13. Bengkulu
14. Bima
15. Binjai
16. Bitung
17. Blitar
18. Bogor
19. Bontang
20. Bukittinggi
21. Cilegon
22. Cimahi
23. Cirebon
24. Denpasar
25. Depok
26. Dumai
27. Gorontalo
28. Gunungsitoli
29. North Jakarta
30. West Jakarta
31. Central Jakarta
32. East Jakarta
33. South Jakarta
34. Jambi
35. Jayapura
36. Kediri
37. Kendari
38. Kotamobagu
39. Kupang
40. Langsa
41. Lhokseumawe
42. Lubuklinggau
43. Madiun
44. Magelang
45. Makassar
46. Malang
47. Manado
48. Mataram
49. Medan
50. Metro
51. Mojokerto
52. Padang
53. Padang Panjang
54. Padangsidimpuan
55. Pagar Alam
56. Palangka Raya
57. Palembang
58. Palopo
59. Palu
60. Pangkal Pinang
61. Parepare
62. Pariaman
63. Pasuruan
64. Payakumbuh
65. Pekalongan
66. Pekanbaru
67. Pematang Siantar
68. Pontianak
69. Prabumulih
70. Probolinggo
71. Sabang
72. Salatiga
73. Samarinda
74. Sawahlunto
75. Semarang
76. Serang
77. Sibolga
78. Singkawang
79. Solok
80. Sorong
81. South Tangerang
82. Subulussalam
83. Sukabumi
84. Sungai Penuh
85. Surabaya
86. Surakarta
87. Tangerang
88. Tanjungbalai
89. Tanjung Pinang
90. Tarakan
91. Tasikmalaya
92. Tebing Tinggi
93. Tegal
94. Ternate
95. Tidore
96. Tomohon
97. Tual
98. Yogyakarta

== Office Address ==
Rasuna Office Park III Unit WO. 06-09, Jl. Taman Rasuna Selatan, Rasuna Epicentrum Complex, Kuningan Area, Jakarta 12960 - Indonesia
