= 2020 Surabaya mayoral election =

← 2015	9 December 2020	2024 →
- Registered: 2,098,510
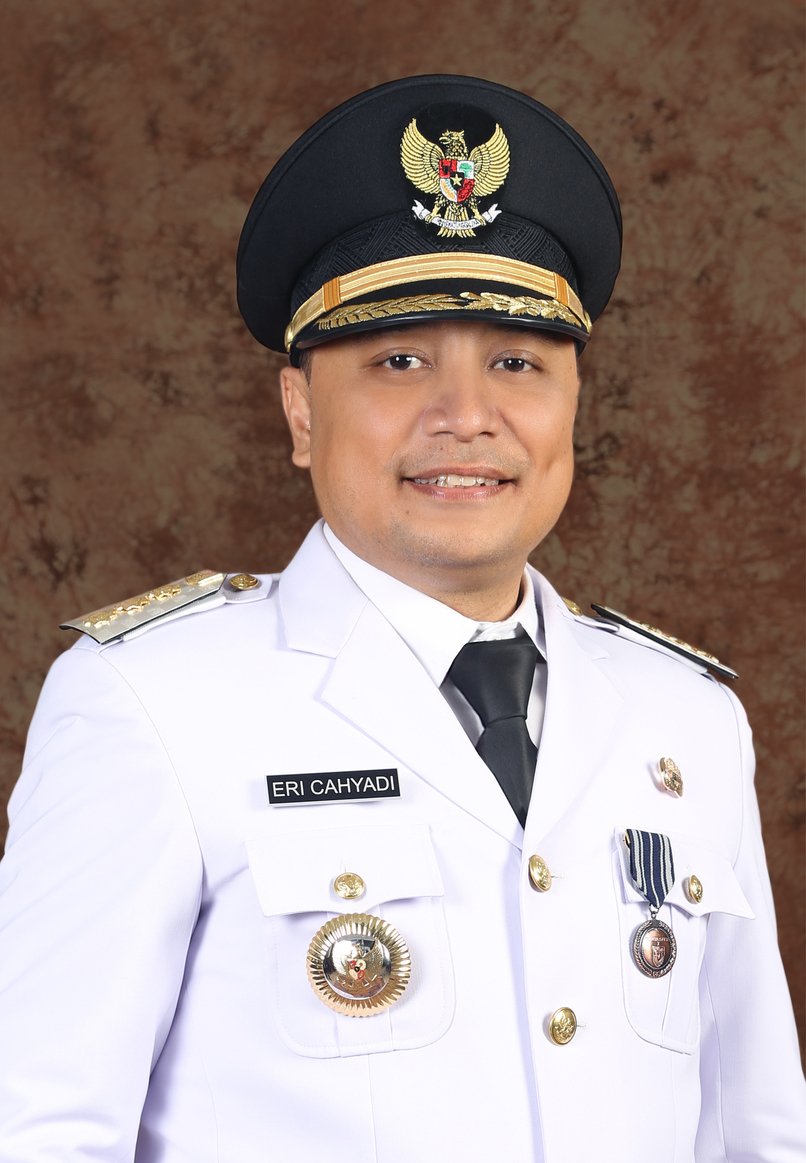

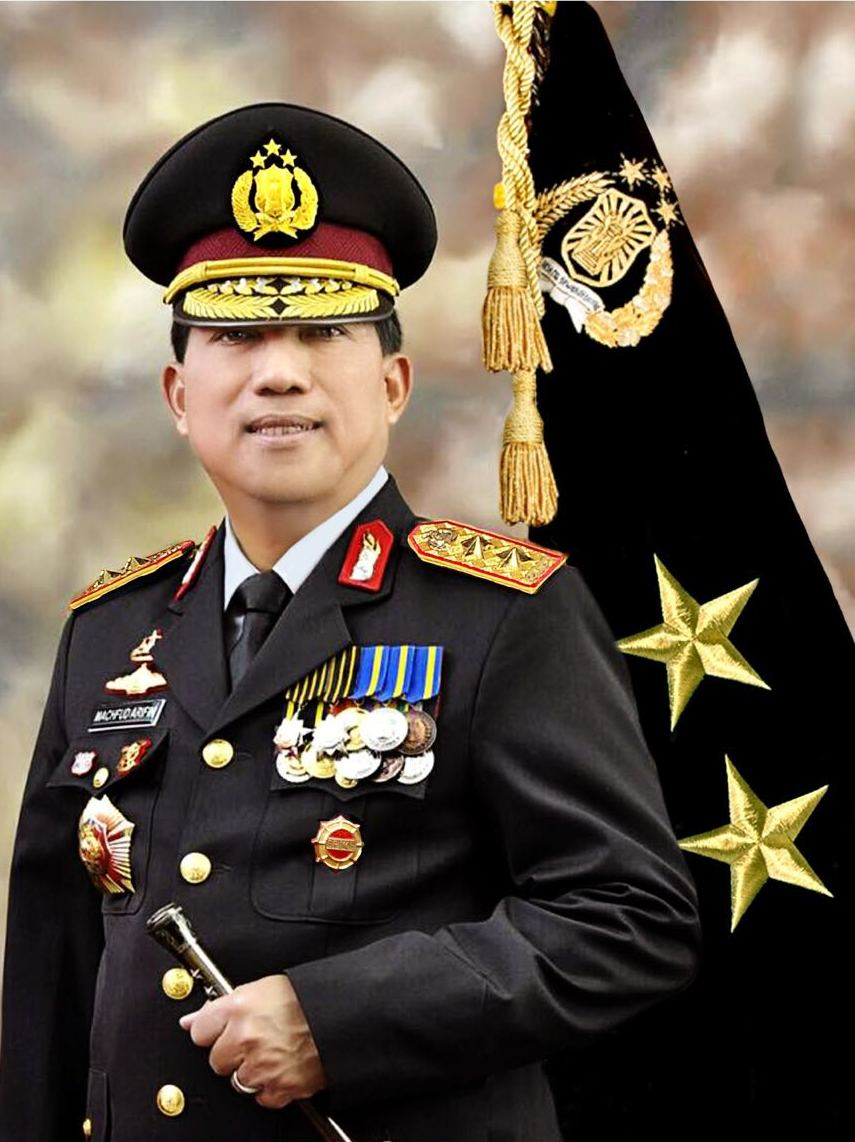
Candidate	Eri Cahyadi	Machfud Arifin
Party	PDI-P	Independent
Running mate	Armuji	Mujiaman Sukirno
Popular vote	597,540	451,794
Percentage	56.94%	43.06%
- Results map by subdistrict (Interactive version)
Mayor before election
Whisnu Sakti Buana
PDI-P
Elected mayor
Eri Cahyadi
PDI-P

The 2020 Surabaya mayoral election was held on 9 December 2020, as part of the 2020 simultaneous local elections across Indonesia.

== Candidates ==
Two candidates ran in the election:

- Eri Cahyadi, senior municipal bureaucrat most recently head of the Surabaya's municipal development planning board, endorsed by PDI-P and PSI,
- Machfud Arifin, former chief of East Java's regional police, endorsed by a coalition of eight political parties represented in the city council.

=== Nominations ===
Cahyadi, who had worked under the current incumbent mayor Tri Rismaharini, received endorsements from Rismaharini's previous campaign team, and later on Rismaharini also participated in campaigning for Cahyadi. His running mate Armudji was a member of the East Java Regional People's Representative Council, and used to be speaker of the Surabaya city council. Cahyadi was selected over fellow PDI-P member and Risma's deputy Whisnu Sakti Buana.

Arifin's running mate was Mujiaman, formerly president director of the municipal water company.

== Campaign ==
Two rounds of public debates were held between the candidates on 4 and 18 November 2020. In terms of reported campaign donations, the Eri-Armudji ticket received Rp 1.8 billion, while the Machfud-Mujiaman ticket received Rp 7.3 billion. On 1 December 2020, the Surabaya branch of PDI-P filed a report against the Machfud-Mujiaman campaign team for using Rismaharini's imagery in campaigning material while she had declared her support for the Eri-Armudji ticket.

A number of survey organizations conducted opinion polls regarding the mayoral election, with differing results.

== Results ==
1. Eri-Armuji (56.94%)
2. Machfud-Mujiaman (43.06%)

Candidate	Running mate	Party	Votes	%
Eri Cahyadi	Armuji	PDI-P	597,540	56.94
Machfud Arifin	Mujiaman Sukirno	Independent	451,794	43.06
Total			1,049,334	100.00
Registered voters/turnout			2,098,510	–
Source: KPU

=== Results by district ===
District	Eri-Armuji		Machfud-Mujiaman		Total
District	Votes	%	Votes	%	Total
Asem Rowo	7,143	42.88	9,515	57.12	16,658
Benowo	16,345	60.81	10,536	39.19	26,980
Bubutan	18,648	52.82	16,658	47.18	35,306
Bulak	9,291	58.28	6,651	41.72	15,942
Dukuh Pakis	12,993	63.74	7,391	36.26	20,384
Gayungan	8,615	57.68	6,322	42.32	14,937
Genteng	12,509	61.79	7,734	38.21	20,243
Gubeng	27,195	57.87	19,795	42.13	46,924
Gunung Anyar	13,360	61.48	8,370	38.52	21,730
Jambangan	11,314	60.09	7,513	39.91	18,857
Karang Pilang	15,204	55.93	11,978	44.07	27,182
Kenjeran	31,503	54.27	26,543	45.73	58,025
Krembangan	22,329	51.66	20,895	48.34	43,229
Lakarsantri	12,671	57.56	9,341	42.44	22,088
Mulyorejo	18,601	65.99	9,588	34.01	28,189
Pabean Cantikan	11,759	47.99	12,742	52.01	24,501
Pakal	13,248	54.70	10,973	45.30	24,331
Rungkut	26,706	61.91	16,430	38.09	43,136
Sambikerep	14,093	58.06	10,182	41.94	24,314
Sawahan	43,637	59.85	29,277	40.15	72,922
Semampir	24,786	41.76	34,570	58.24	59,369
Simokerto	17,294	54.74	14,301	45.26	31,595
Sukolilo	23,135	61.48	14,498	38.52	37,611
Sukomanunggal	22,552	59.99	15,040	40.01	37,592
Tambaksari	49,266	62.82	29,157	37.18	78,046
Tandes	18,792	53.83	16,116	46.17	34,908
Tegalsari	19,918	59.89	13,340	40.11	33,228
Tenggilis Mejoyo	11,970	55.37	9,647	44.63	21,617
Wiyung	16,392	62.60	9,793	37.40	26,185
Wonocolo	16,062	56.16	12,538	43.84	28,697
Wonokromo	30,209	55.36	24,360	44.64	54,626
Total	597,540	56.94	451,794	43.06	1,049,352
Source: KPU
