= Whisnu Sakti Buana =

Indonesian politician (1974–2023)

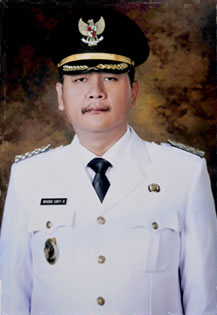
- Buana in 2015

16th Mayor of Surabaya
- In office 11 February 2021 – 17 February 2021; Acting: 24 December 2020 – 11 February 2021
- Preceded by: Tri Rismaharini
- Succeeded by: Eri Cahyadi

Personal details
- Born: 22 October 1974; Surabaya, East Java, Indonesia
- Died: 27 May 2023 (aged 48); Surabaya, East Java, Indonesia
- Political party: PDI-P

Whisnu Sakti Buana (22 October 1974 – 27 May 2023) was an Indonesian politician. He briefly served as the mayor of Surabaya between December 2020 and February 2021, mostly in an acting capacity to replace Tri Rismaharini for whom he had served under as vice-mayor of Surabaya between 2014 and 2015, and again between 2016 and 2020.

== Early life ==
Whisnu was born on 22 October 1974 in Surabaya. Whisnu's father, Soetjipto Soedjono, was a senior politician within the Indonesian Democratic Party of Struggle (PDI-P), and had served as deputy speaker of the People's Consultative Assembly. Whisnu studied engineering at the Sepuluh November Institute of Technology in Surabaya, and obtained a bachelor's degree.

== Career ==
Whisnu was a member of Surabaya's city council, and had served as the legislature's deputy speaker as a member of PDI-P. As deputy speaker in 2010, he was expelled from the chamber by the speaker Wisnu Wardhana during the dispute over a proposed tax. He was appointed to replace Bambang Dwi Hartono as mayor Tri Rismaharini (Risma)'s deputy on 8 November 2013, although he was only sworn in on 24 January 2014. As Risma's deputy, Whisnu publicly opposed her 2014 decision to shut down the Dolly red-light district, citing the economic dependence of the local inhabitants and lost jobs beyond the sex workers. Regardless, Risma retained Whisnu as running mate, and the pair was reelected following the 2015 mayoral election with over 86% of votes. Risma and Whisnu's first term ended on 28 September 2015, and their second term commenced on 17 February 2016.

When Risma was appointed Minister of Social Affairs on 23 December 2020, Whisnu became the acting mayor the following day. He was officially sworn in as a full mayor on 11 February 2021, although his tenure would only last one week, as it ended on 17 February 2021. Whisnu had registered to run as PDI-P's candidate in the city's 2020 mayoral election, but the party instead endorsed Eri Cahyadi with running mate Armuji, and Whisnu campaigned for Cahyadi during the election.

Whisnu had intended to run for a seat in the East Java Regional People's Representative Council in the 2024 legislative election.

== Death ==
Whisnu died on 27 May 2023 due to a heart attack. He was buried the following day at the Keputih Public Cemetery in Surabaya.

== Personal life ==
Whisnu married Dini Syafariah Endah, a middle school friend, in 2017. They had four children.
