= 2015 North Kalimantan gubernatorial election =

| 8 December 2015 | 2020 → |
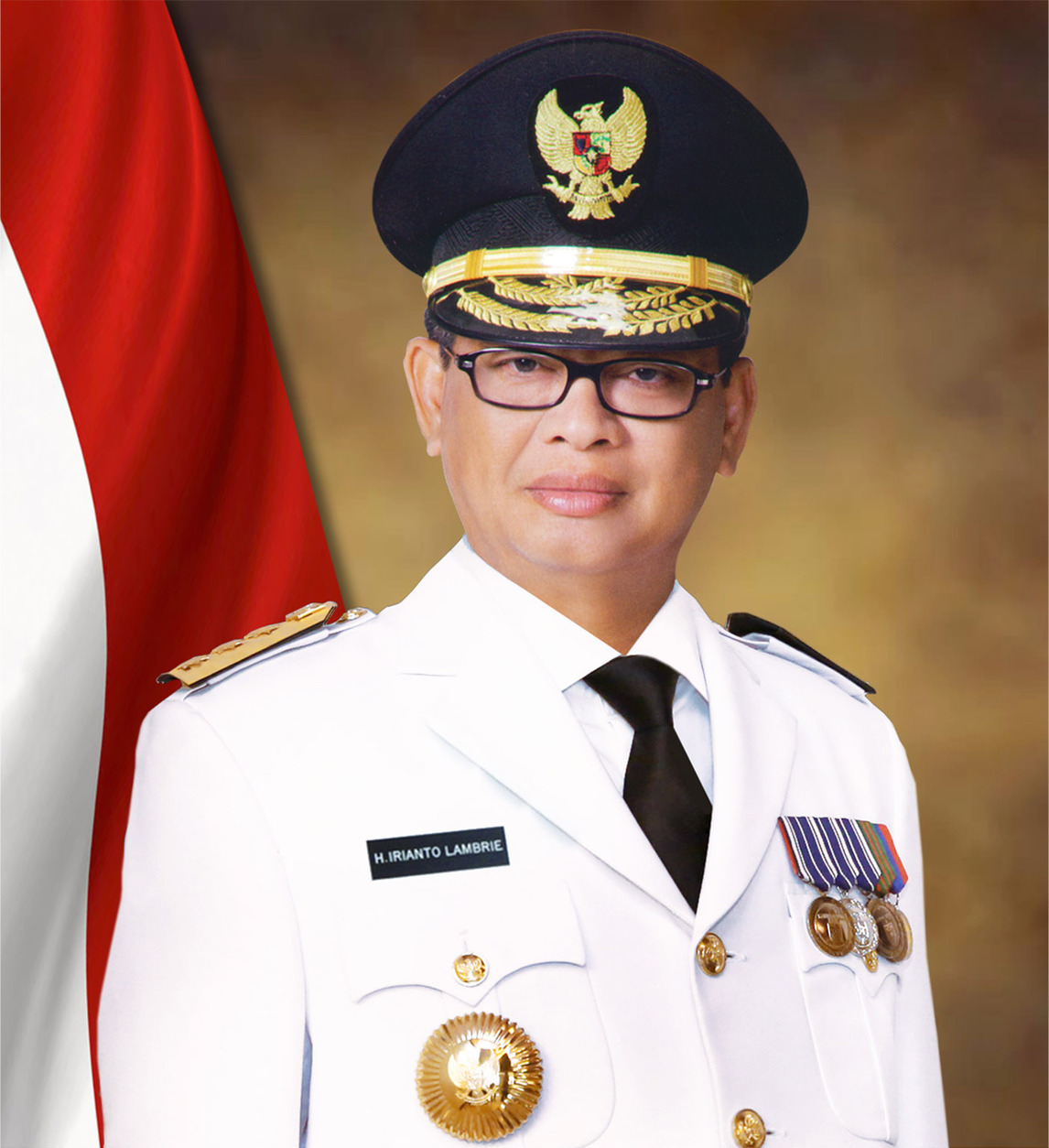

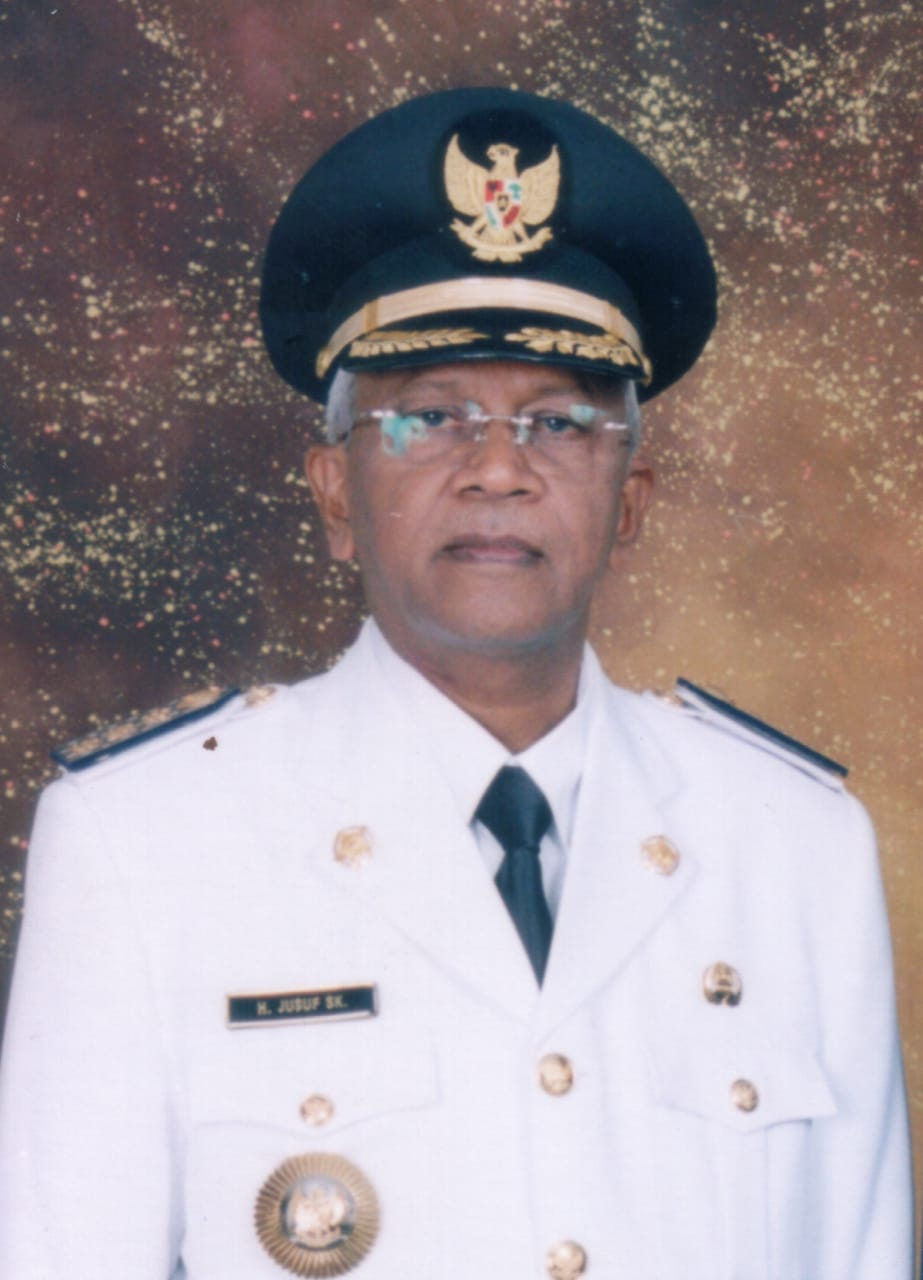
| Nominee | Irianto Lambrie | Jusuf Serang Kasim |
| Party | Demokrat | NasDem |
| Running mate | Udin Hianggio | Marthin Bilia |
| Popular vote | 143,592 | 127,184 |
| Percentage | 53.03% | 46.97% |
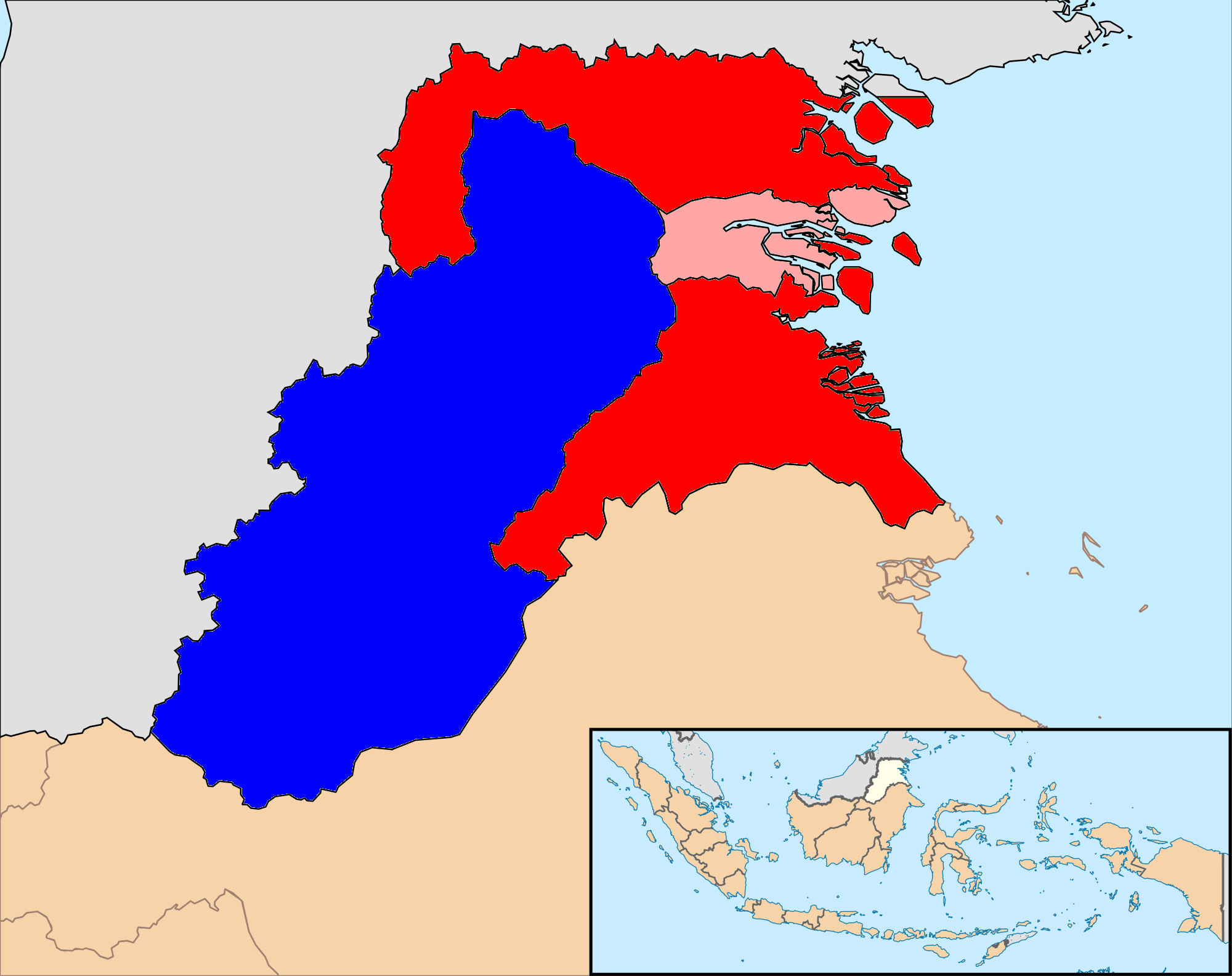
- Results by regency/city. Regencies/cities won by Irianto Lambrie are in red (■), while the ones won by [Jusuf Serang Kasim are in blue (■). Lighter shades (■ or ■) indicate a winning majority of less than 5%.
Governor before election
Triyo Budi Sasongko
(acting)
Elected Governor
Irianto Lambrie
Demokrat

A gubernatorial election was held across the province of North Kalimantan on 8 December 2015, to elect the province's governor for the 2016-2021 five-year term. There were two pairs contesting the election, and Irianto Lambrie who had previously taken a temporary post as the province's governor defeated former Tarakan mayor Jusuf Serang Kasim.

The election was first to be held in North Kalimantan, which is Indonesia's youngest province. Following the voting, riots occurred in the provincial capital of Tanjungselor protesting the results.

== Background ==
In October 2012, North Kalimantan was carved out of the northern regencies and cities of East Kalimantan province. It became Indonesia's 34th and youngest province. The Ministry of Home Affairs initially handled the administration of the province, before appointing East Kalimantan's provincial secretary Irianto Lambrie as acting governor in April 2013. His term lasted for two one-year terms, before the ministry replaced him on 22 April 2015 with Triyono Budi Sasongko.

== Timeline ==
Registration for candidates backed by political parties were opened between 26 and 28 July 2015, with independent contestants registering in June. After a series of verifications and checks, the eligible candidates were announced on 24 August with their ballot numbers assigned the following day. The campaigning period officially ran between 27 August and 5 December. Following a 3-day election silence, voting was held on 9 December. Votes are recapitulated up across administrative divisions and the results were to be announced on 21 December 2015, although exact dates may vary.

There were over 430,000 eligible voters who voted in 612 polling stations across the province. Due to the sheer size of the province and sparse population, ballot boxes and other election-related logistics had to be delivered by plane and speedboats. In total, the election required a budget of Rp 96 billion (US$6.9 million).

== Candidates ==
| # | Candidate | Most recent position | Running mate | Parties |
|---|---|---|---|---|
| 1 | Jusuf Serang Kasim | Mayor of Tarakan (1999-2009) | Marthin Billa | Hanura; Nasdem; PKB; PKPI |
| 2 | Irianto Lambrie | Acting governor of North Kalimantan (2013-2015) | Udin Hianggio | PDI-P; Demokrat; Golkar; Gerindra; PKS; PAN; PPP; PBB |

== Results ==
| Votes by subdivision (Note: Official results prior to final recapitulation. Final results differed by around 300 votes.) | Jusuf-Marthin | | Irianto-Udin | |
| Votes by subdivision | Votes | % | Votes | % |
|---|---|---|---|---|
| Bulungan Regency | 27,018 | 45.66 | 32,149 | 54.34 |
| Tarakan | 35,995 | 45.09 | 43,833 | 54.91 |
| Malinau Regency | 20,294 | 59.34 | 13,907 | 40.66 |
| Nunukan | 37,068 | 43.83 | 47,510 | 56.17 |
| Tana Tidung Regency | 5,639 | 49.43 | 5,770 | 50.57 |
| Total | 126,014 | 46.81 | 143,169 | 53.19 |
| Valid votes | | | 269,066 | 97.62 |
| Invalid votes | | | 6,786 | 2.38 |
| Turnout | | | 275,781 | 63.01 |
| Registered voters | | | 437,663 | |

=== Aftermath ===
Early quick count results by Indikator favored the Irianto-Udin pair. During a plenary vote-tallying meeting on 19 December, supporters of the Jusuf-Marthin pair rioted in Tanjungselor, burning cars and buildings in the gubernatorial complex and forcing the deployment of soldiers. Following the riots, vice governor candidate Marthin Billa was arrested on suspicion of organizing them although he was not jailed and was only required to report weekly.

The election was disputed in the Constitutional Court although it upheld the results. Irianto and Udin were sworn in by president Joko Widodo on 12 February 2016.
