= 2024 Surabaya mayoral election =

- 27 November 2024
- Turnout: 56.21%
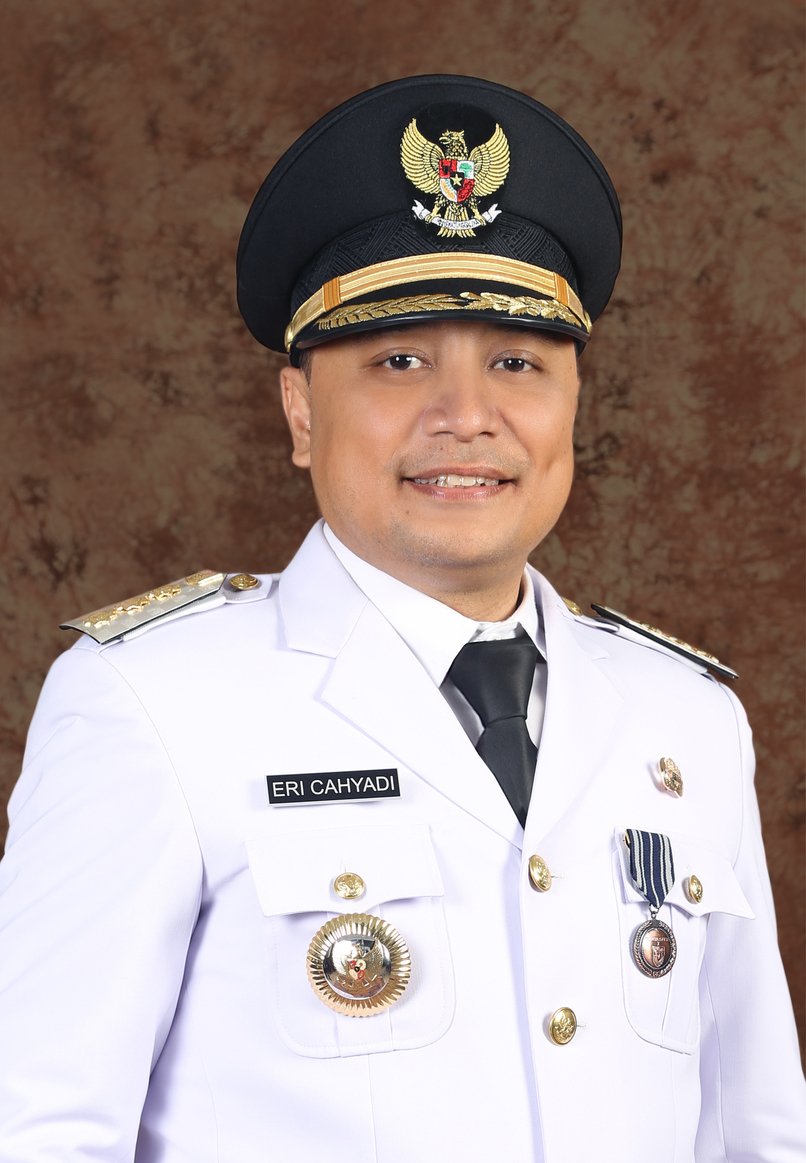

Candidate	Eri Cahyadi	Blank box
Party	PDI-P
Running mate	Armuji
Popular vote	980,380	224,340
Percentage	81.38%	18.62%
Mayor before election
Eri Cahyadi
PDI-P
Elected mayor
Eri Cahyadi
PDI-P

Mayoral elections were held in Surabaya on 27 November 2024 as part of nationwide local elections to elect the mayor and vice mayor for a five-year term. Incumbent Mayor Eri Cahyadi of the Indonesian Democratic Party of Struggle (PDI-P) was re-elected unopposed, securing 81% of the vote. Votes for the blank box option comprised 18% of all valid ballots cast.

== Electoral system ==
The election, like other local elections in 2024, follow the first-past-the-post system where the candidate with the most votes wins the election, even if they do not win a majority. It is possible for a candidate to run uncontested, in which case the candidate is still required to win a majority of votes "against" an "empty box" option. Should the candidate fail to do so, the election will be repeated on a later date.

== Candidates ==
According to electoral regulations, candidates were required to secure support from 10 seats in the Surabaya City Regional House of Representatives. With 11 seats, the Indonesian Democratic Party of Struggle is the only party eligible to nominate a candidate without forming coalitions with other political parties. Independent candidates were required to demonstrate support in form of photocopies of identity cards, which in Surabaya's case corresponds to 144,209 copies. Two prospective pairs of independent candidates submitted applications, but neither qualified to run as they did not collect enough identity cards.

=== Potential ===
The following are individuals who have either been publicly mentioned as a potential candidate, or considered as such by press:

- Eri Cahyadi (PDI-P), incumbent mayor.

- Armuji (PDI-P), incumbent vice mayor (as running mate).

- Bayu Airlangga (Golkar), former member of the East Java Regional House of Representatives.
- Ahmad Dhani (Gerindra), elected member of the House of Representatives representing Surabaya and Sidoarjo and musician.
- Machfud Arifin (Independent), Opponent of Eri Cahyadi in previous mayoral election (2020), former two-star police (inspector) general, head of East Java regional police.

== Political map ==
Following the 2024 Indonesian general election, ten political parties are represented in the Surabaya City Regional House of Representatives:

Political parties	Seat count
Indonesian Democratic Party of Struggle (PDI-P)	11 / 50
Great Indonesia Movement Party (Gerindra)	8 / 50
Party of Functional Groups (Golkar)	5 / 50
National Awakening Party (PKB)	5 / 50
Prosperous Justice Party (PKS)	5 / 50
Indonesian Solidarity Party (PSI)	5 / 50
Democratic Party (Demokrat)	3 / 50
National Mandate Party (PAN)	3 / 50
United Development Party (PPP)	3 / 50
NasDem Party	2 / 50

== Results ==
Eri Cahyadi won the election unopposed with 81% of the vote, while blank ballots accounted for 18% of all valid votes cast. Voter turnout was 56%, the lowest in East Java in 2024.

Candidate	Running mate	Party	Votes	%
Eri Cahyadi	Armuji	Indonesian Democratic Party of Struggle	980,380	81.38
Blank box			224,340	18.62
Total			1,204,720	100.00
Valid votes			1,204,720	96.15
Invalid votes			48,253	3.85
Total votes			1,252,973	100.00
Registered voters/turnout			2,229,244	56.21
Source: CNN Indonesia, detik.com
