= Mayor of Surabaya =

Elected politician in Surabaya, Indonesia

- Wali Kota Surabaya
- Coat of arms of Surabaya

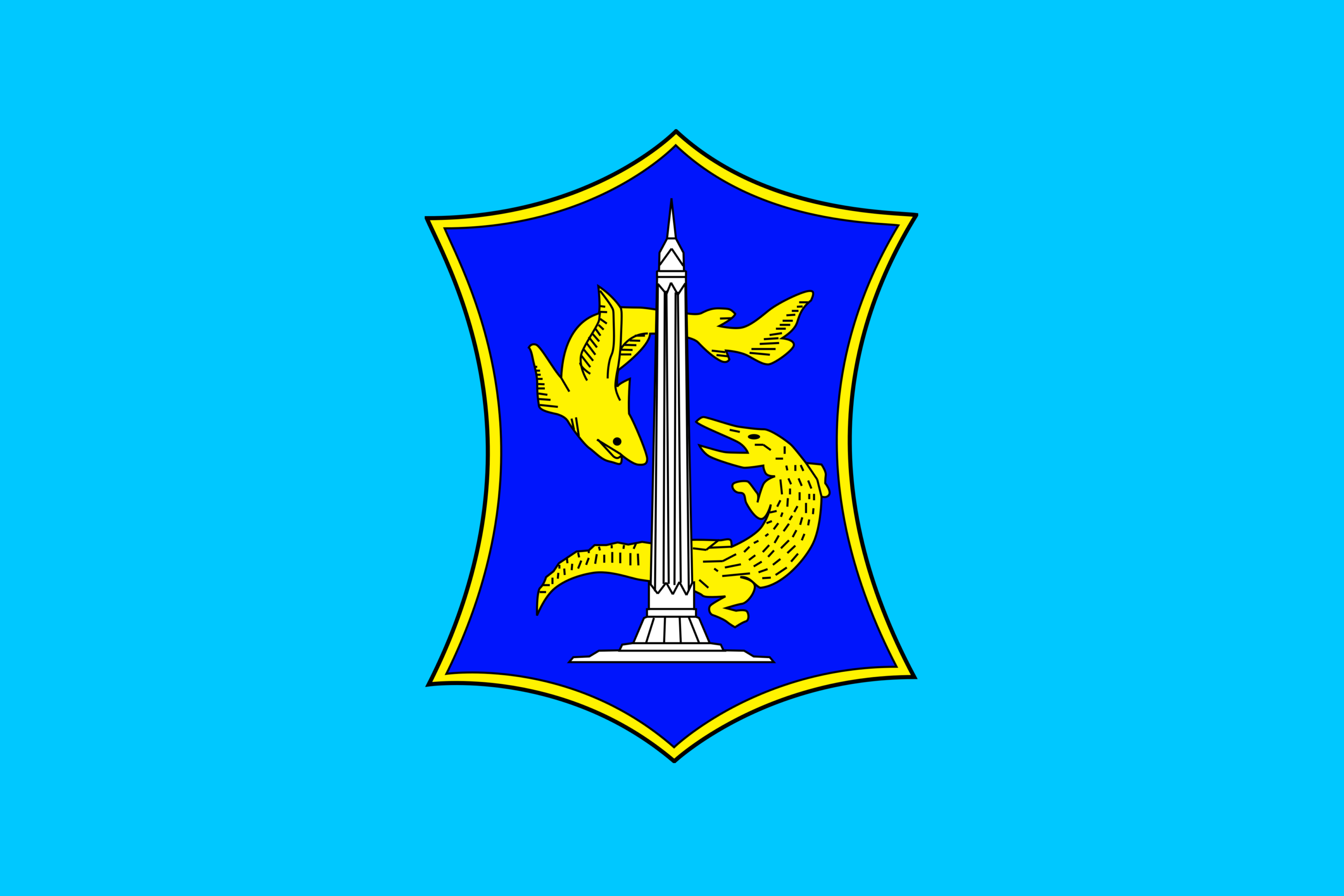
- Flag of Surabaya

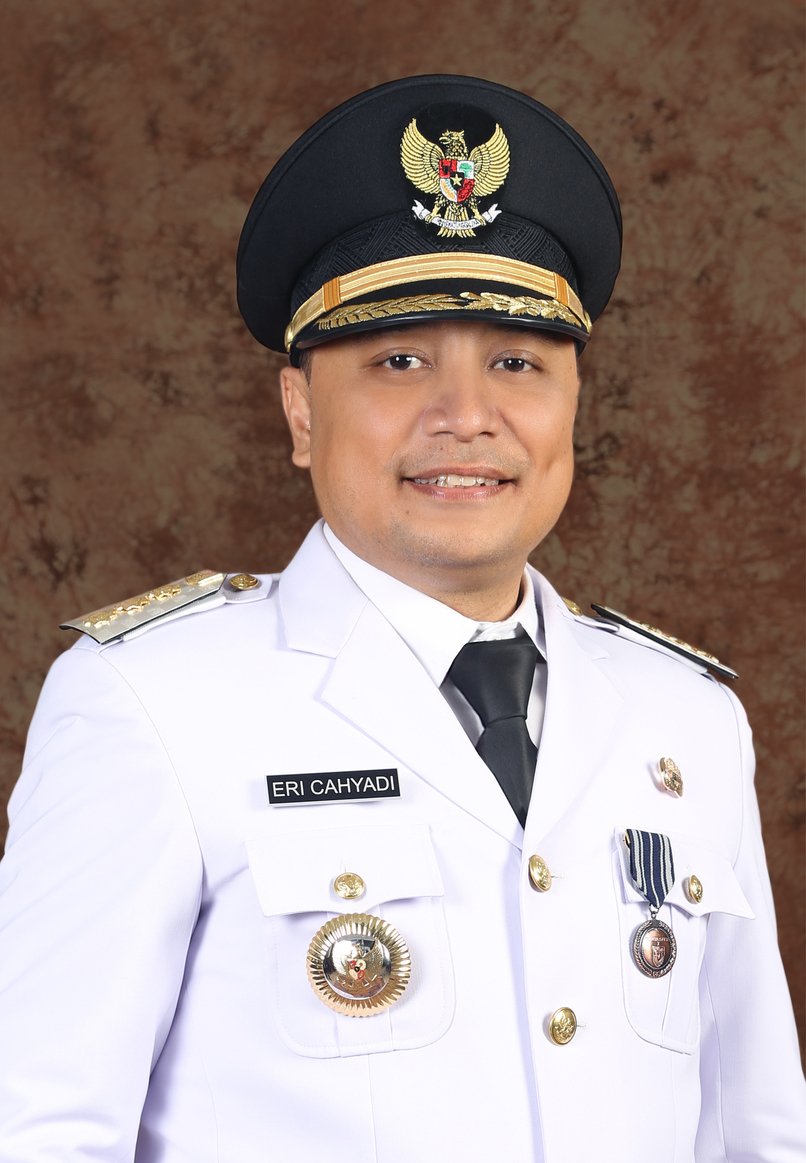
- Incumbent; Eri Cahyadi since 26 February 2021
- Term length: 5 years
- Inaugural holder: Mr. A. Meijroos
- Formation: 1916
- Website: www.surabaya.go.id

The mayor of Surabaya is an elected politician who is responsible for governing the city of Surabaya in Java. The first mayor of Surabaya was Mr A. Meijroos, who governed the city during the Dutch colonisation period from 1916 to 1920.

== List of mayors of Surabaya ==
No.	Image	Name	Took office	Left office	Party	Vice Mayor	Term	Notes
Burgemeester of Soerabaja
1		Mr. A. Meijroos	21 August 1916	1920	N/A	N/A	1	(Note: As Soerabaja Burgemeester)
2		Ir. G.J. Dijkerman	1920	1929	N/A	N/A	2	
3		Mr. H.I. Bussemaker	1929	1932	N/A	N/A	3	
4		Mr. W.H. van Helsdingen	1932	1935	N/A	N/A	4	
5		Mr. W.A.H. Fuchter	November 1935	February 1942	N/A	N/A	5	
—		Radjamin Nasution	February 1942	September 1942	Parindra	N/A	6	(Note: When the Dutch left Soerabaja in February 1942, Radjamin controlled the government) (Note: The first Indonesian native to become Acting. Mayor of Surabaya (Soerabaja Burgemeester))
Soerabaja under Japanese Occupation
1		Takashi Ichiro	February 1942	17 August 1945	N/A	Radjamin Nasution	1	(Note: When the Japanese controlled the city of Surabaya, Takashi Ichiro served as mayor and Radjamin Nasution as assistant (now called Vice Mayor). Then when Japan lost, Takashi completely handed over the position of Mayor to Radjamin)
Head of Surabaya
1		Radjamin Nasution	17 August 1945	28 August 1945	Parindra	N/A	1	
Head of Haminte Surabaya
—		Mr. C.J.G. Becht	1945	December 1945		N/A	8	
Mayor of Surabaya
2		Indrakoesoema	December 1945	February 1946	Independent	N/A	2	
3		Soerjadi	February 1946	1950	Independent	N/A	3	(Note: Known as upholding the sovereignty of the civil government in Surabaya)
4		Doel Arnowo	1950	1952	Indonesian National Party	N/A	4	
5		Moestadjab Soemowidagdo	1952	1956	Independent	N/A	5	
6		Istadjab Tjokrokoesoemo	1956	30 June 1958	Independent	N/A	6	
7		Raden Satrio Sastrodiredjo	30 June 1958	22 May 1963	Communist Party of Indonesia	N/A	7	(Note: Satrio was appointed Vice Governor of East Java after his term of office ended)
8		Moerachman	13 December 1963	29 October 1965	Independent	N/A	8	(Note: Even though he is an independent, Moerachman is close to the PKI, even the party appointed him as mayor. Moerachman is suspected of being involved in the September 30 Movement (G30S) / PKI (Indonesian Communist Party) events)
9		Raden Soekotjo Sastrodinoto	29 October 1965	4 November 1969	Military	N/A	9	
9		Raden Soekotjo Sastrodinoto	4 November 1969	23 January 1974	Military	N/A	10	
10		Raden Soeparno	23 January 1974	23 January 1979	Military	N/A	11	
11		Moehadji Widjaja	27 January 1979	20 June 1984	Military	N/A	12	
12		Poernomo Kasidi	20 June 1984	20 June 1989	Military	Soenarjo (1988–1992)	13 (1984)	
12		Poernomo Kasidi	20 June 1989	20 June 1994	Military	Soenarjo (1988–1992)	14 (1989)	
12		Poernomo Kasidi	20 June 1989	20 June 1994	Military	Istijono Soenarto (1992–1995)	14 (1989)	
13		Soenarto Soemoprawiro	20 June 1994	7 March 2000	Military	Istijono Soenarto (1992–1995)	15 (1994)	
13		Soenarto Soemoprawiro	20 June 1994	7 March 2000	Military	Wardji (1995–2000)	15 (1994)	
13		Soenarto Soemoprawiro	7 March 2000	16 January 2002	Military	Bambang Dwi Hartono	16 (2000)	
14		Bambang Dwi Hartono	10 June 2002	7 March 2005	PDIP	Vacant	16 (2000)	
14		Bambang Dwi Hartono	31 Agustus 2005	31 Agustus 2010	PDIP	Arif Afandi	17 (2005)	
15		Tri Rismaharini	28 September 2010	28 September 2015	PDIP	Bambang Dwi Hartono (2010–2013)	18 (2010)	(Note: The first female Mayor of Surabaya)
15		Tri Rismaharini	28 September 2010	28 September 2015	PDIP	Whisnu Sakti Buana (2014–2020)	18 (2010)	(Note: The first female Mayor of Surabaya)
15		Tri Rismaharini	17 February 2016	23 December 2020	PDIP	Whisnu Sakti Buana (2014–2020)	19 (2015)	(Note: Resigned as Minister of Social Affairs)
16		Whisnu Sakti Buana	11 February 2021	17 February 2021	PDIP	Vacant	19 (2015)	(Note: Appointed as Mayor of Surabaya replacing Tri Rismaharini who was Minister of Social Affairs)
17		Eri Cahyadi	26 February 2021	Incumbent	PDIP	Armuji (2021–present)	20 (2020)	
17		Eri Cahyadi	26 February 2021	Incumbent	PDIP	Armuji (2021–present)	21 (2024)	(Note: Re-elected because he only ran against an blank box)

Parties

Independent	Parindra	Indonesian National Party
Communist Party of Indonesia	Military	PDIP

== Acting mayor ==
In the case of government, a regional head who applies for leave or temporarily resigns from his position with the central government, then the Governor of East Java prepares a replacement who is a bureaucrat in the regional government or even a deputy mayor, including when the mayor's position is in a transition period.

No.	Portrait	Acting mayor	Took office	Left office	Time in office	The definitive mayor
1		Bambang Dwi Hartono	16 January 2002	10 June 2002	16 (2000)	Soenarto Soemoprawiro
2		Chusnul Arifien Damuri	7 March 2005	31 August 2005	Transition	
3		Soekamto Hadi	31 August 2010	28 September 2010	Transition	
4		Nurwiyatno	28 September 2015	17 February 2016	Transition	
5		Whisnu Sakti Buana	24 December 2020	11 February 2021	19 (2015)	Tri Rismaharini
6		Hendro Gunawan	17 February 2021	26 February 2021	Transition	

Parties

Independent	PDIP

== See also ==
- Surabaya
- List of incumbent regional heads and deputy regional heads in East Java
