= Soeparno (mayor) =

Indonesian military officer and politician (1922–2000)

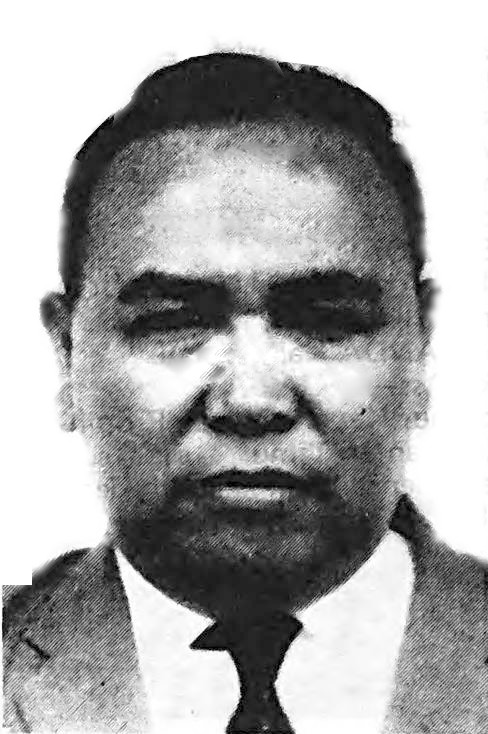
- Soeparno, c. 1973

10th Mayor of Surabaya
- In office 23 January 1974 – 23 January 1979
- Preceded by: Soekotjo Sastrodinoto
- Succeeded by: Moehadji Widjaja

Personal details
- Born: 11 December 1922; Kutoarjo, Purworejo, Dutch East Indies
- Died: 2000 (aged 77–78)
- Profession: Teacher, politician

Soeparno (11 December 1922 – 2000) was an Indonesian military officer and politician who served as the mayor of Surabaya, East Java between 1974 and 1979. Prior to his government career, he had studied and worked as a teacher before joining in the Indonesian Army, as part of the Brawijaya and Mulawarman Regional Military Commands.

== Early life ==
Soeparno was born in Kutoarjo, today in Purworejo Regency of Central Java, on 11 December 1922. He received education in a Schakelschool, graduating in 1937 before enrolling at an auxiliary teachers' school for natives (Hollandsch Inlandsche Kweekschool). He graduated from the teachers' school in 1941.

== Career ==
After graduating from the teachers' school, Soeparno began to work at a Hollandsch-Inlandsche School (Dutch school for natives), teaching until 1944 before moving to an elementary school. Following the proclamation of Indonesian independence, he continued to teach as a middle school teacher for some time before joining the Indonesian Army as a cadet. He fought in the Battle of Surabaya, Operation Product, Operation Kraai, and against the Indonesian Communist Party in the Madiun Affair. During this period, he enrolled at the cadets' school.

Soeparno continued his military career in the Brawijaya Regional Military Command in East Java, graduating from the army's trainer school in 1952, officer school in 1960, and the Indonesian Army Command and General Staff College in 1965. He took part in operations against separatist movements (Operation Saptamarga), and later in purges against the Indonesian Communist Party. In 1968, he was reassigned to the Mulawarman Regional Military Command in East Kalimantan to become the Military Command's chief of staff. During this posting, Soeparno engaged significantly in local politics and led the local operations of the Golkar party, leading the party to victory there in the 1971 election. After his time in Mulawarman, he was appointed into the People's Consultative Assembly in 1972 as a regional representative for East Kalimantan, with the rank of colonel.

On 23 January 1974, he was appointed as the mayor of Surabaya. Soeparno's tenure had seen the Turi Market, then one of Surabaya's busiest commercial centers, burn down in a fire, and Soeparno initiated its reconstruction. In 1975, he also set the establishment date of the city to 31 May 1293, commemorating Raden Wijaya's victory over the Mongol army, despite protests from historians who disagreed with the date. Prior to 1975, Surabaya celebrated the city's establishment based on the colonial establishment of the city on 1 April 1906. His term expired on 23 January 1979, and the governor of East Java at the time Sunandar Priyosudarmo decided against selecting Soeparno for a second term. Sunandar had assessed Soeparno's tenure in Surabaya as insufficient, with the issue of traffic, flooding and industrial development still unresolved. Soeparno was given a "grade" of six by Sunandar for his tenure, while Sunandar had previously stated that he would give a "grade" of seven if his standards were met. Sunandar had also openly criticized the city's "chaos" in 1976, prompting large-scale cleanups by Soeparno.

Soeparno died in 2000.
