= Armuji =

Indonesian politician (born 1965)

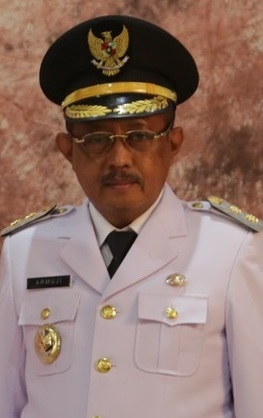

8th Vice mayor of Surabaya
- Incumbent
- Assumed office 26 February 2021
- Mayor: Eri Cahyadi
- Preceded by: Whisnu Sakti Buana

Speaker of Surabaya City Regional House of Representatives
- In office 17 September 2014 – 24 August 2019
- Preceded by: Mochamad Machmud
- Succeeded by: Adi Sutarwijono

Personal details
- Born: June 8, 1965 (age 60) Surabaya, Indonesia
- Party: PDI-P
- Spouse: Iswahyurini
- Occupation: Politician

Armuji or Armudji ( ꦄꦂꦩꦸꦗꦶ ) (born 8 June 1965) is an Indonesian politician, member of the Indonesian Democratic Party of Struggle who is serving as vice mayor of Surabaya alongside mayor Eri Cahyadi, who won the 2020 Surabaya mayoral election against former police inspector general Machfud Arifin. The pair is collectively called Erji.

Armuji previously served as a member, vice speaker, then speaker of the Surabaya House of Representatives before being elected into the East Java Regional House of Representatives in 2019. Before that, Armuji also served as the head of the Athletic Association of Indonesia.

== Officeholding history ==
- Member of the Surabaya City Regional House of Representatives (1999–2019)
- Surabaya City Regional House of Representatives vice speaker (2009–2014)
- Speaker of the Surabaya City Regional House of Representatives (2003–2004; 2014–2019)
- Member of East Java Regional House of Representatives (2019–2020)
- Vice mayor of Surabaya (2021–present)

== Organizational history ==
- Secretary of DPC PDI Perjuangan Surabaya (2010–2015)
- Vice head of DPC PDI Perjuangan Surabaya (2015–2019)
- Vice head of Workers' group DPD PDI Perjuangan Jawa Timur (2010–2015)
- Vice head of Tourism organization DPD PDI Perjuangan Jawa Timur (2015–2020)
