= Sukadji Hendrotomo =

Indonesian army officer (1927–1982)

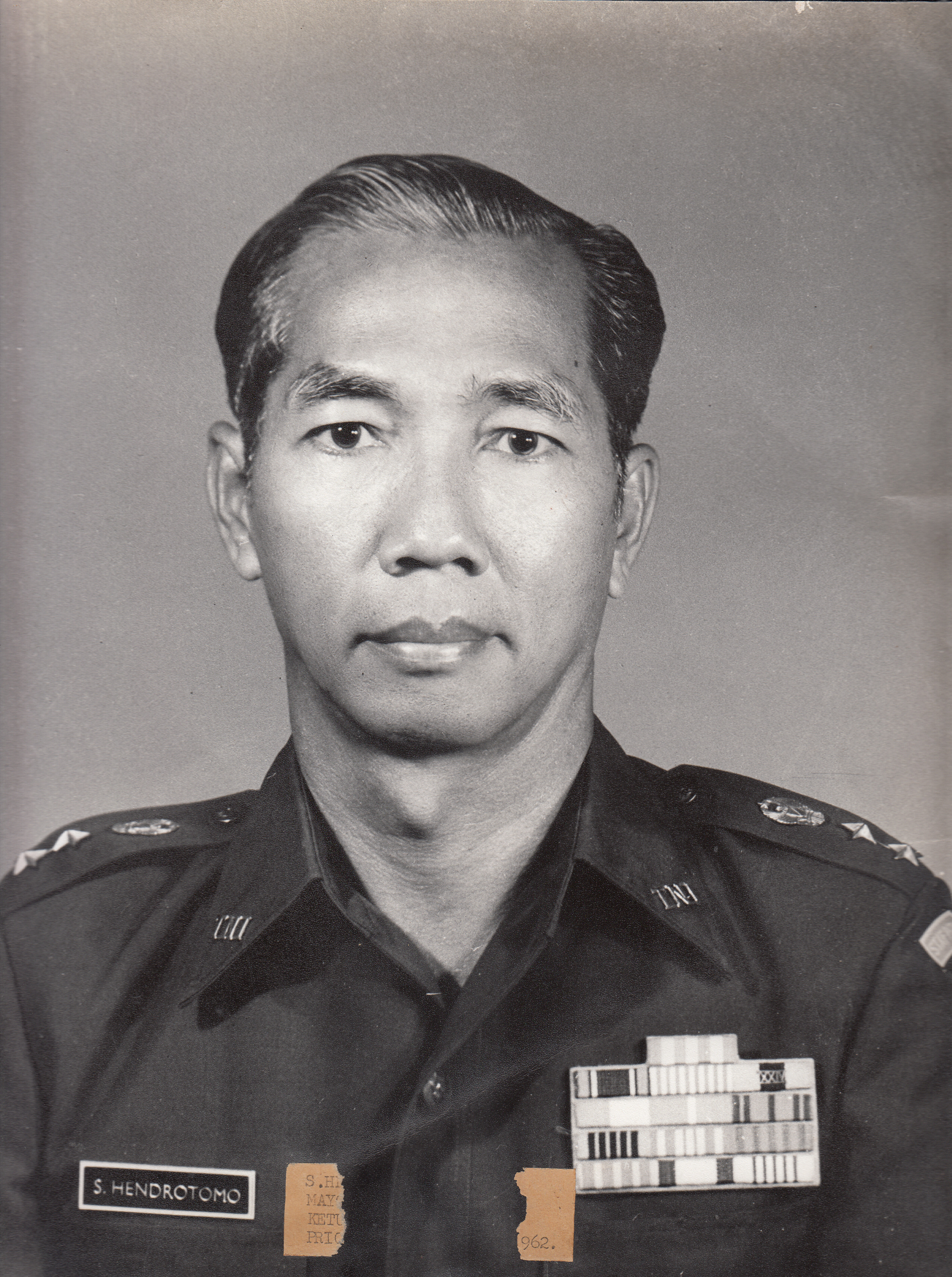

Associate Justice of the Supreme Court of Indonesia
- In office 26 January 1974 – 15 July 1982
- President: Suharto

Legal Chief of the Indonesian Armed Forces
- In office 2 February 1971 – 14 March 1974
- Preceded by: office established
- Succeeded by: Sri Hardiman

Personal details
- Born: 17 April 1927 Tulungagung, Central Java, Dutch East Indies
- Died: 15 July 1982 (aged 55) Jakarta, Indonesia
- Resting place: Kalibata Heroes' Cemetery

Military service
- Allegiance: Indonesia
- Branch/service: Indonesian Army
- Years of service: 1945–1982
- Rank: Major general
- Unit: Legal

Sukadji Hendrotomo (17 April 1927 – 15 July 1982) was an Indonesian army officer and military judge who served as an associate justice of the Supreme Court from 1974 until his death in 1982. Previously, he was the armed forces legal chief from 1971 until 1974.

== Early life ==
Sukadji was born in Tulungagung on 17 April 1927. During the Indonesian National Revolution, Sukadji joined the Indonesian Army and was given the rank of first lieutenant. He was assigned as a company commander in the S Brigade, with its headquarters at a small strip in the Kediri regency of East Java, which holds a huge number of refugees. After the refugees were evacuated from the strip, Sukadji's company was attached to the Sabirin Battalion (later changed to Sikatan Battalion).

Sukadji's subordinate, Soekotjo Sastrodinoto, who commanded a platoon, captured left-wing revolutionary leader Tan Malaka. He ordered Tan Malaka's execution by one of his men, Suradi Tekebek, and buried his body in a grave in the middle of a forest. Sukadji later received a report about the execution verbally from Soekotjo, and Sukadji later reported it to his superior Surachmad. The issue was never talked about again, although Sukadji told it secretly to his roommate Soedarto, while he was hospitalized in 1958.

== Career ==
After the end of the Indonesian National Revolution, Hendrotomo was sent to study military law at the Military Law Academy in 1952. He received his associate degree in law in 1956 and completed his studies later with a full degree.

Hendrotomo had already been appointed as a military judge in 1957, prior to his graduation from the academy. Upon his graduation, Hendrotomo was appointed as the head of the newly-formed Palembang Military Court in 1960 and served until 1962. He was appointed as the permanent chief judge of the Extraordinary Military Court in 1964 and the chief judge of the Jakarta Military Court sometime in the late 1960s. During his career as a judge, Hendrotomo presided several notable cases, such as the trial of Jungschlager and Schmidt, Chris Soumokil, and Sudisman. In the trials of Soumokil and Sudisman, Hendrotomo personally sentenced them to death.

On 2 February 1971, Hendrotomo, who had already held the rank of brigadier general, was appointed as the legal chief of the armed forces. He ex officio became the chief judge of the high military court. During his tenure, Hendrotomo sentenced former minister Major-General Hartono Wirjodiprodjo to prison for illegal gun trade. Two years into his office, on 27 September 1973 he was nominated by the House of Representatives as an associate justice. His nomination was approved and he was installed as associate justice on 26 January 1974. He handed over his office to Sri Hardiman on 14 March.

== Death ==
Hendrotomo died as an associate justice on the midnight of 15 July 1982 in Jakarta. On the day of his death, Hendrotomo's youngest daughter was supposed to solemnize her marriage contract (akad nikah). The marriage contract was done instead in front of his body.

Hendrotomo was buried two days after his death at the Kalibata Heroes' Cemetery.
