= Radjamin Nasution =

Indonesian politician and civil servant

1st Mayor of Surabaya
- In office 17 August 1945 – 28 August 1945
- Preceded by: Takahashi Ichiro
- Succeeded by: C.J.G. Becht

Personal details
- Born: 15 August 1892; Barbaran Julu, Mandailing Natal, Dutch East Indies
- Died: 10 February 1957 (aged 64)

Radjamin Nasution (15 August 1892 – 10 February 1957) was an Indonesian politician and civil servant. He briefly served as the first Indonesian mayor of Surabaya in August 1945, during the early months of the Indonesian National Revolution, although he was not officially discharged until 1950. He worked as a customs official during the Dutch East Indies era.

== Early life ==
Nasution was born on 15 August 1892 in the village of Barbaran Julu, today in West Panyabungan District of Mandailing Natal Regency. As his father was a civil servant of decent rank, Nasution was able to enroll at a European school (Europeesche Lagere School) in Padang Sidempuan. In 1912, he enrolled at the STOVIA medical school in Batavia.

== Career ==
=== Government ===
Although he graduated with a medical degree, Nasution was not assigned to the colonial government's medical service and was instead given a job at its customs department. He was initially posted in Batavia, and he was reassigned around the Dutch East Indies between 1912 and 1917 when he returned to Batavia. He was then promoted, and was stationed in Medan before moving to Surabaya in 1929. He was elected as a member of the municipal council in 1931. He also continued to work as a bureaucrat, becoming head of the Surabaya customs office by 1938. He was then appointed as an alderman of the city in October 1938.

After the Japanese takeover in 1942, he was retained in the municipal government and appointed as deputy to the Japanese-appointed mayor Takahashi Ichiro. In the immediate aftermath of the Pacific War and the proclamation of Indonesian independence on 17 August 1945, Ichiro handed over the mayoral position to Nasution on 17 August 1945. Municipal government functions, however, were taken over by Regional Indonesian National Committee, led by Doel Arnowo, on 28 August. Nasution nominally maintained his office, however, as a mayor "in exile". During the Battle of Surabaya, Nasution doubled as the city's health service chief due to his medical training, and coordinated search and rescue operations. He also helped to manage refugees from the city in the nearby towns of Mojokerto and Tulungagung.

After the Dutch–Indonesian Round Table Conference, Surabaya experienced a leadership dispute. Nasution still maintained his office as mayor, as recognized by the Republican government in Yogyakarta, while another mayor Indrakoesoema had been appointed by the federal government in Jakarta. Eventually, Nasution was honorably discharged from his mayoral position by the Yogyakarta government on 31 March 1950 and reassigned as a civil servant within the Ministry of Home Affairs, while also being given back pay for his mayoral duties dating back to 1948. Nasution would later run as a legislative candidate under Parindra in the 1955 legislative election.

=== Football ===
During his time in Medan, Nasution had served for sometime as president of the football club Deli Voetbal Bond (today PSDS Deli Serdang). He also founded the SKVB (Soerabajasche Kantoor Voetbalbond) club, with its members being Surabaya's office workers. Later, the club merged into Persebaya Surabaya in 1950. He would serve as Persebaya's president between 1953 and 1955.

== Death ==
Nasution died on 10 February 1957, and was buried at the Rangkah Cemetery in Surabaya.
