= Church of the Birth of Our Lady, Surabaya =

Catholic church in Indonesia

Church of the Birth of Our Lady
- Kepanjen Church
- Gereja Katolik Kelahiran Santa Perawan Maria Kepanjen
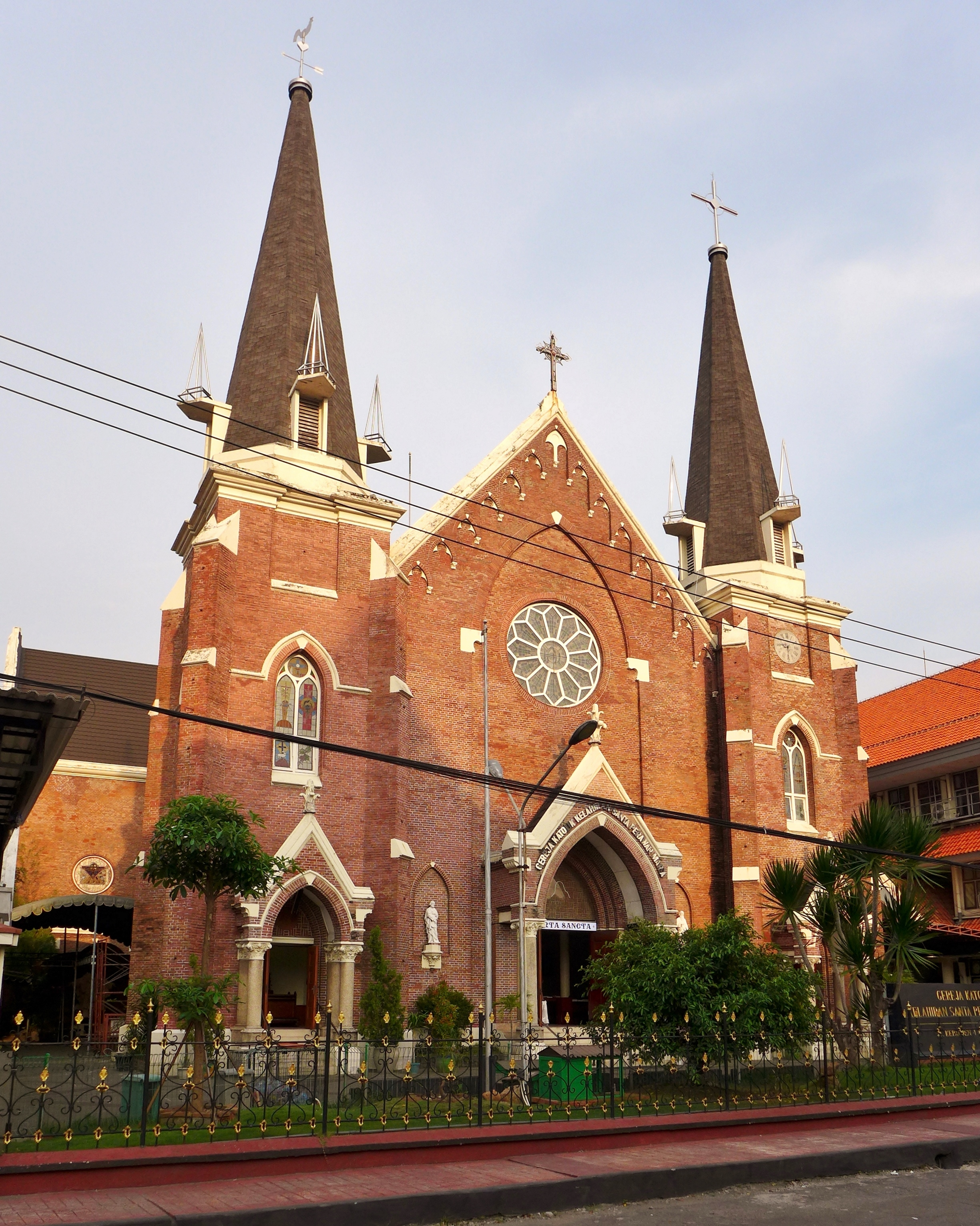
- The church in 2025

- Location of Kepanjen Church
- 7.242204°S 112.736615°E
- Location: Jalan Kepanjen 4-6, Surabaya
- Country: Indonesia
- Denomination: Roman Catholic

History
- Former name: Onze Lieve Vrouw Geboorte Kerk

Architecture
- Functional status: Active
- Architect: W. Westmaas
- Style: Gothic revival Brick gothic
- Groundbreaking: April 18, 1899
- Completed: August 5, 1900
- Construction cost: 165,000 guilders

Administration
- Parish: Congregation of the Mission (CM)

The Church of the Birth of Our Lady, also known as the Kepanjen Church, is a Roman Catholic church in Surabaya, East Java, Indonesia. Completed in 1899, it is the oldest Roman Catholic church in Surabaya and among the oldest churches in Surabaya.

== History ==
=== Catholicism in Surabaya ===
The first Roman Catholic church in Surabaya was located at what is now the corner of Jalan Kepanjen and Jalan Kebonrojo. Before the construction of this church, Father Hendricus Waanders and Father Philippus Wedding were sent from the Netherlands as the pastor for the Indies; at first Waanders was stationed in Batavia while Wedding was stationed in Surabaya, after that Waanders was stationed in Surabaya while Wedding switched place to Batavia. Under Waanders, the Roman Catholic congregation in Surabaya grew considerably, resulting in a new plan to construct a larger church building. In 1822, the congregation was able to construct a new church building located in what is now the corner of Roomsche Kerkstraat (now Jalan Kepanjen) and Komedie weg (now Jalan Kebonrojo).

=== A new church ===
Construction of the present church in Kepanjen was started when Pastor C.W.J. Wenneker bought a piece of land from the colonial government for 8,815 guilders in 1889 located to the north of the former church. A new church was required to replace the dilapidated older church and because of the growing congregation. Construction of the new Roman Catholic church was started on April 18, 1899, following the design of W. Westmaas. Construction was completed on August 5, 1900. It was consecrated as Onze Lieve Vrouw Geboorte Kerk in 1900 by the Archbishop of Batavia, Mgr Edmundus Luypen SJ.

== Building ==
The Church was designed by W. Westmaas, among his previous project was the reconstruction of the Blenduk Church in 1894. During its construction, the pile foundation had to be adjusted to reach the depth of 16 meter because of the relatively unstable ground, compared with the initial planning of 4 meter deep pile foundation. 799 pillars was needed to establish the foundation, the pillars were made of galam wood from Kalimantan. The red bricks were imported from Europe. The columns and the original furniture were made of teak.

The church suffered fire damage during the 1945 Battle of Surabaya. Some of the original bricks had to be replaced with new ones, resulting in uneven coloration.

== Cited works ==
- Akihary, Huib (1990). Architectuur & Stedebouw in Indonesië 1870-1970 [Architecture & Urban Planning in Indonesia] (in Dutch). Zutphen: De Walburg Pers. ISBN 9072691024.
- Tjokrosaputro, Teddy; Satriani, Lewi (2012). Triani Retno A.; Rini Nurul Badariah (eds.). 100 Gereja Terindah Indonesia [100 Most Beautiful Churches in Indonesia] (in Indonesian). Jakarta: PT. Andalan Media. ISBN 9786029973112.

== See also ==
- List of church buildings in Indonesia
