= Soekotjo Sastrodinoto =

Indonesian military officer and politician

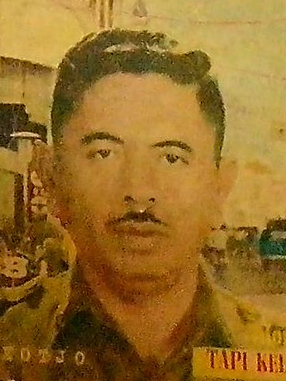

9th Mayor of Surabaya
- In office 4 November 1965 – 23 January 1974
- Preceded by: Moerachman
- Succeeded by: Soeparno

Personal details
- Born: 1921; Tulungagung, Dutch East Indies
- Died: 16 December 1992 (aged 70–71)

Soekotjo Sastrodinoto (1921 – 16 December 1992) was an Indonesian military officer and politician. He was a brigadier general in the Indonesian Army, having served since the Indonesian National Revolution. He was also the mayor of Surabaya, East Java, between 1965 and 1974.

== Early life ==
Soekotjo was born on 1921 in Tulungagung. He studied at the colonial schools Hollandsch-Inlandsche School, MULO, and finally at an Algemene Middelbare School prior to the outbreak of the Pacific War and the Japanese invasion of the Dutch East Indies. During the Japanese occupation, he joined the Japan-backed Defenders of the Homeland militia organization.

== Career ==
Soekotjo joined the Indonesian National Armed Forces during the Indonesian National Revolution, and enrolled at the newly formed Indonesian Military Academy. By early 1949 he was a second lieutenant. According to Dutch historian Harry A. Poeze, Soekotjo commanded a platoon of the Brawijaya Division and had captured left-wing revolutionary leader Tan Malaka. Poeze wrote that Soekotjo ordered Tan Malaka's execution by one of his men, Suradi Tekebek, on 21 February 1949, and buried his body in a grave in the middle of a forest. In the account, Soekotjo did not file a written report over the execution, although he did report it to his superior Hendrotomo.

After the revolution, Soekotjo continued to serve within Brawijaya. Some time before the 30 September movement in 1965, he had been assigned as commander of the military district (Kodim) in Surabaya with the rank of colonel. He was appointed as acting mayor of the city on 4 November 1965, and was later officially appointed as full mayor on 14 September 1967. The purges against the Indonesian Communist Party occurred during his early tenure, and Soekotjo enforced new residency requirements while purging PKI members in neighborhood associations in his first months in office. He further ordered the clearance of squatters in the city's roads and riverbanks, with the squatter neighborhoods being seen as communist strongholds and potential hiding locations. The municipal government also rounded up the homeless, including some of the displaced squatters, and signed them up for the transmigration program.

In December 1965, Surabaya was declared a "closed city" in order to stem urbanisation, to little long-term success. The following year, Soekotjo formed a team of officials and architects to create a master plan for the city's redevelopment. Later in his mayoralship, he ordered a review into the city's foundation date, previously set to 1906 as per the colonial founding year. The formal change, however, would happen after his tenure. His term as mayor ended on 23 January 1974, and he was replaced by Soeparno. According to his family, he kept chickens in Mojokerto afterwards. He held the rank of brigadier general at the time of his retirement.

== Family and death ==
He was married to Siti Suprapti Soekotjo, and the couple had five children. He died on 16 December 1992, and was buried at the Surabaya's 10 November Heroes' Cemetery.
