= Sunarto Sumoprawiro =

Indonesian army officer and politician

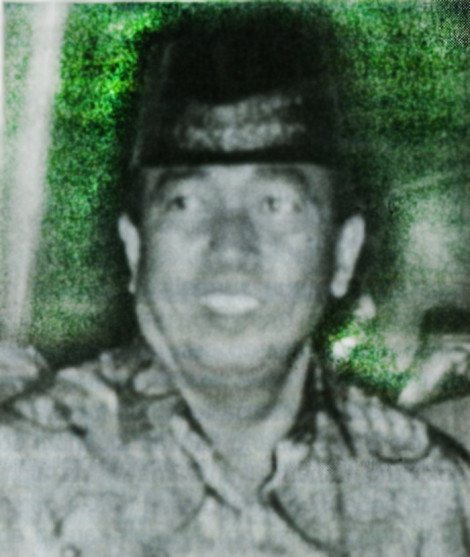

13th Mayor of Surabaya
- In office 20 June 1994 – 15 January 2002
- Preceded by: Poernomo Kasidi
- Succeeded by: Bambang Dwi Hartono

Personal details
- Born: 10 November 1944; Surabaya, Japan-occupied Dutch East Indies
- Died: 17 February 2003 (aged 58); Melbourne, Australia

Sunarto Sumoprawiro (10 November 1944 – 17 February 2003) was an Indonesian politician and retired army officer who was the mayor of Surabaya between 1994 and 2002.

== Biography ==
Sumoprawiro was born in Surabaya on 10 November 1944, the fourth of nine children. He served in the Special Forces branch (Kopassus) of the Indonesian Army, retiring with the rank of colonel.

He was first elected as the mayor of Surabaya on 20 June 1994, and was reelected for a second term on 7 February 2000 with the support of the National Awakening Party. During his time as mayor, he was also the president of the football club Persebaya. He also came up with the idea for and initiated the construction of the Al-Akbar Mosque, the second largest mosque in Indonesia. In June 2000, he was elected first chairman of the newly formed Association of Indonesia Municipalities, or Indonesian City Governments' Association (APEKSI).

Starting around September 2001, he became sick and was treated in a hospital in Melbourne due to a liver illness for a long period, which resulted in the city council impeaching him for the long absence on 15 January 2002 and he was replaced by his deputy Bambang Dwi Hartono.

He died in Austin Hospital of Melbourne on 17 February 2003 after falling into a coma. He was buried at Surabaya's Heroes' Cemetery on 20 February.
