= Al-Akbar Mosque =

Mosque in Surabaya, East Java, Indonesia

Al-Akbar National Mosque
- Masjid Nasional Al-Akbar Surabaya

- Location in Surabaya Al-Akbar Mosque (Indonesia) Al-Akbar Mosque (Asia) Al-Akbar Mosque (Earth)

Religion
- Affiliation: Sunni Islam

Location
- Location: Surabaya, Indonesia
- Interactive map of Al-Akbar National Mosque
- Administration: East Java Provincial Government
- Coordinates: 7°20′12″S 112°42′55″E

Architecture
- Architect: ITS team
- Type: Mosque
- Style: Islamic
- Groundbreaking: 1995
- Completed: 2000

Specifications
- Capacity: 59,000 pilgrims
- Dome: 4
- Dome height (outer): 27 m (89 ft)
- Minaret: 1
- Minaret height: 99 m (325 ft)

Website
- www.masjidalakbar.or.id

Al-Akbar National Mosque of Surabaya (Indonesian: Masjid Nasional Al-Akbar Surabaya), also known as Al-Akbar Mosque (Indonesian: Masjid Al-Akbar, lit. 'Great Mosque' or Great Mosque of Surabaya, is a national mosque located in Surabaya, East Java. It is the second largest mosque in Indonesia after the Istiqlal Mosque in Jakarta in terms of maximum capacity. The location of the mosque is beside the Surabaya-Gempol Highway. Its most distinctive feature is its large vertical dome, accompanied by four small blue domes. It also has a minaret with a height of 99 meters, an ode to the 99 names of Allah.

The groundbreaking was initiated on August 4, 1995, after an idea by Soenarto Soemoprawiro, the Mayor of Surabaya at the time. The construction was marked by the laying of the first stones by Try Sutrisno, the Vice President of Indonesia. Due to the 1997 Asian financial crisis however, the construction was temporarily suspended. The construction was resumed in 1999 and completed in 2000. On November 10, 2000, inauguration was held by the President of Indonesia, KH. Abdurrahman Wahid.

Height of the Minaret of Al-Akbar Mosque, which is 99 meters, is an ode to the 99 Names of Allah.

In terms of area, the building and supporting facilities combined are 22,300 square meters wide. The building has length of 147 meters and width of 128 meters. The roof consists of a large dominating dome supported by four small domes and a minaret. The uniqueness of this dome is in its shape which almost resembles a half egg with 1.5 layers which has a height of around 27 meters. To cover the dome, a product that was used for several other mosques such as Selangor Grand Mosque in Shah Alam, Malaysia was also utilized. Other features of this gigantic mosque include the entrance into the high and large rooms of the mosque and its mihrab which is the largest in Indonesia.

== Architecture ==
Architectural design was undertaken by a team from the Sepuluh Nopember Institute of Technology (ITS) in Surabaya with expert consultants who have experience in construction of large mosques in Indonesia. Given the unstable condition of the land with minimal level of solidity, its foundation was carried out with inner or pakubumi foundation system. No less than 2000 poles were embed for the foundation of this mosque.

The floor was designed with a height of 3 meters from the ground surface around the location. However, after the subsequent implementation of the changes in design, the underground room was used as a basement, and the floor above the basement (1st floor) was supported by the poles (flooting floor system). Floor work is made with on-site casting system and made of precast concrete, consisting of rectangular floor plates measuring 3 x 3 meters and 15 cm thickness.

For preparation of roof structures, a concrete beam (ringbalk) was used with a vierendeel system connecting structural columns at a height of 20 m above the ground floor (1st floor). This ringbalk extends 30 m without columns, so that the floor would not be separated by the columns, thus the congregation room would not be separated by divisions or columns for the convenience of the worshipers.

== See also ==
- List of largest mosques
- List of mosques in Indonesia
