= Poernomo Kasidi =

Indonesian politician and military officer (1933–1996)

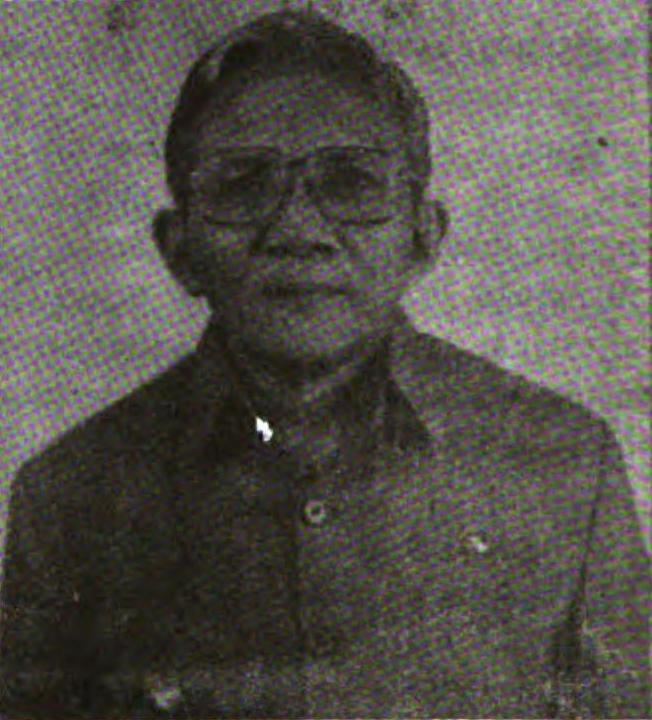

12th Mayor of Surabaya
- In office 20 June 1984 – 20 June 1994
- Preceded by: Moehadji Widjaja
- Succeeded by: Sunarto Sumoprawiro

Personal details
- Born: 22 September 1933; Batavia, Dutch East Indies
- Died: 15 December 1996 (aged 63)

Poernomo Kasidi (22 September 1933 – 15 December 1996) was an Indonesian politician and military officer who was the mayor of Surabaya between 1984 and 1994. He served in the Indonesian Army, and was a colonel.

== Biography ==
Kasidi was born in Jakarta on 22 September 1933. He studied medicine in the University of Indonesia and later at Gadjah Mada University, from which he graduated on 1964. He was married to Asih Harsasih and the couple had four children. He served in the Indonesian Army, where he was the chief medical officer of Kodam IX/Udayana between 1975 and 1982, and later at Kodam V/Brawijaya until he became mayor. He was a colonel.

On 20 June 1984, Kasidi was appointed as mayor to replace Moehadji Widjaja, and he served two terms as mayor until 1994, when he was replaced by Sunarto Sumoprawiro. His time as mayor was known for projects repairing the city's drainage system. The iconic Suroboyo monument was approved and erected during his mayorship.

Kasidi died on 15 December 1996, and he was buried in a public cemetery in Surabaya.
