= Moehadji Widjaja =

Former Mayor of Surabaya

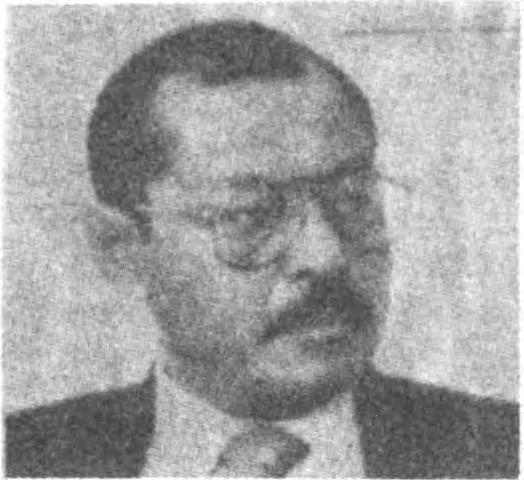

11th Mayor of Surabaya
- In office 27 January 1979 – 20 June 1984
- Preceded by: Soeparno
- Succeeded by: Poernomo Kasidi

Personal details
- Born: 1930 or 1931
- Died: 15 April 1985 (aged 54); Surabaya, Indonesia

Moehadji Widjaja (1930/1931 – 15 April 1985) was an Indonesian military officer and politician who served as Mayor of Surabaya between 1979 and 1984.

== Career ==
Widjaja held a rank of colonel in the Indonesian Military Police Corps.

Before becoming the mayor of Surabaya, Widjaja served as chairman of the Malang city council. He was sworn in as Mayor on 27 January 1979. Under his own admission, there was not a lot of physical development within the city in the first two years of his tenure, partly due to lack of funding in the municipal budget. For a number of development projects of the villages within the city's boundaries, funding was provided by both the municipal government and local contributions. He was replaced by Poernomo Kasidi on 20 June 1984.

He died in his Surabaya home on 15 April 1985 from a heart attack. He was buried at the 10 November 1945 Heroes' Cemetery in Surabaya.
