= Jusuf Serang Kasim =

Indonesian politician (1944–2021)

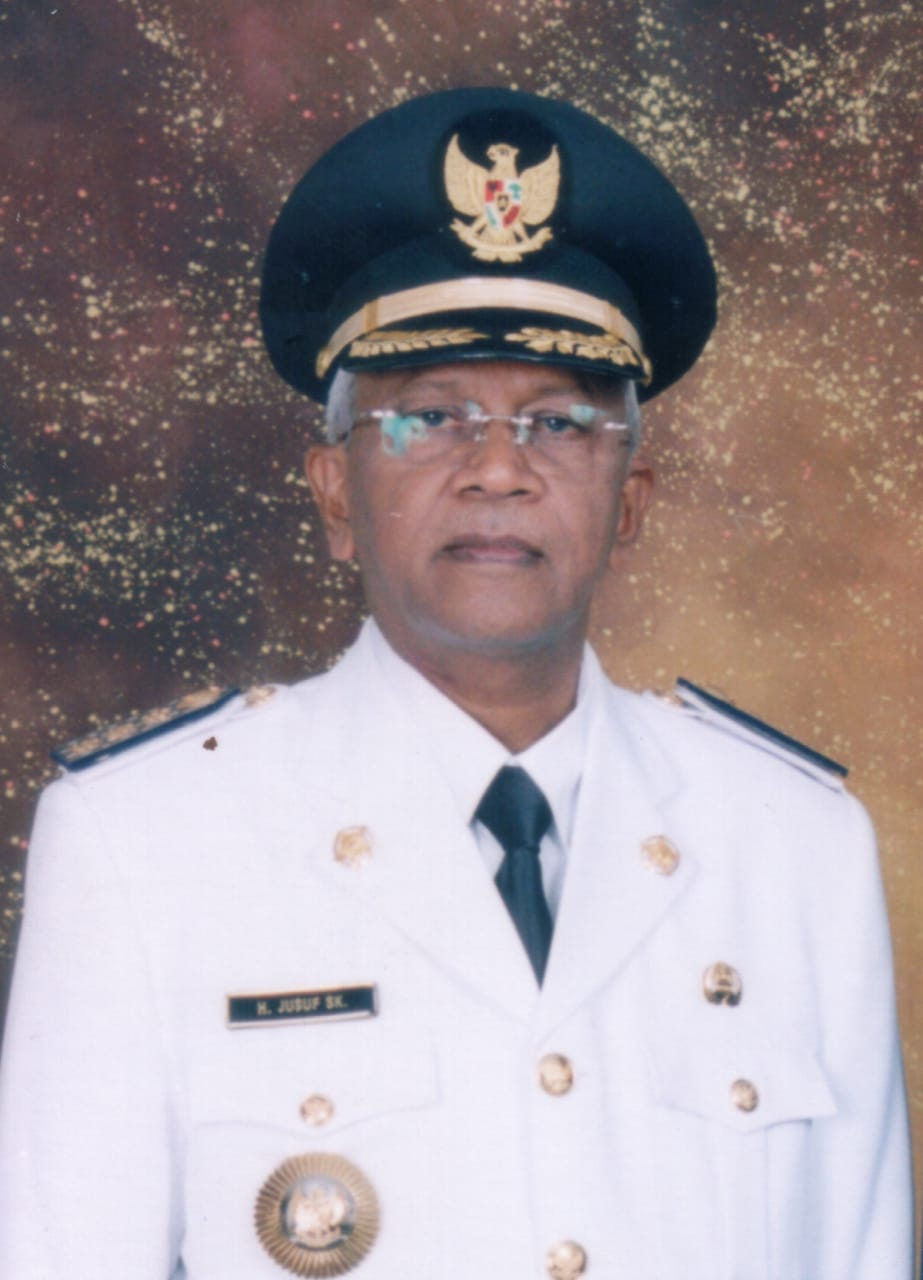

Mayor of Tarakan
- In office 1 March 1999 – 1 March 2009
- Preceded by: position established
- Succeeded by: Udin Hianggio

Personal details
- Born: 2 February 1944 Tarakan, Japanese occupation of the Dutch East Indies
- Died: 12 November 2021 (aged 77) Tarakan, Indonesia
- Party: Golkar (–2014); NasDem Party (2014–2021)

Jusuf Serang Kasim (2 February 1944 – 12 November 2021) was an Indonesian politician. A member of Golkar and later Nasdem, he served as Mayor of Tarakan from 1999 to 2009.
