= Surabaya City Regional House of Representatives =

Municipal legislature of the city of Surabaya, East Java, Indonesia

Surabaya City Regional House of Representatives Dewan Perwakilan Rakyat Daerah Kota Surabaya
- 2024–2029 term
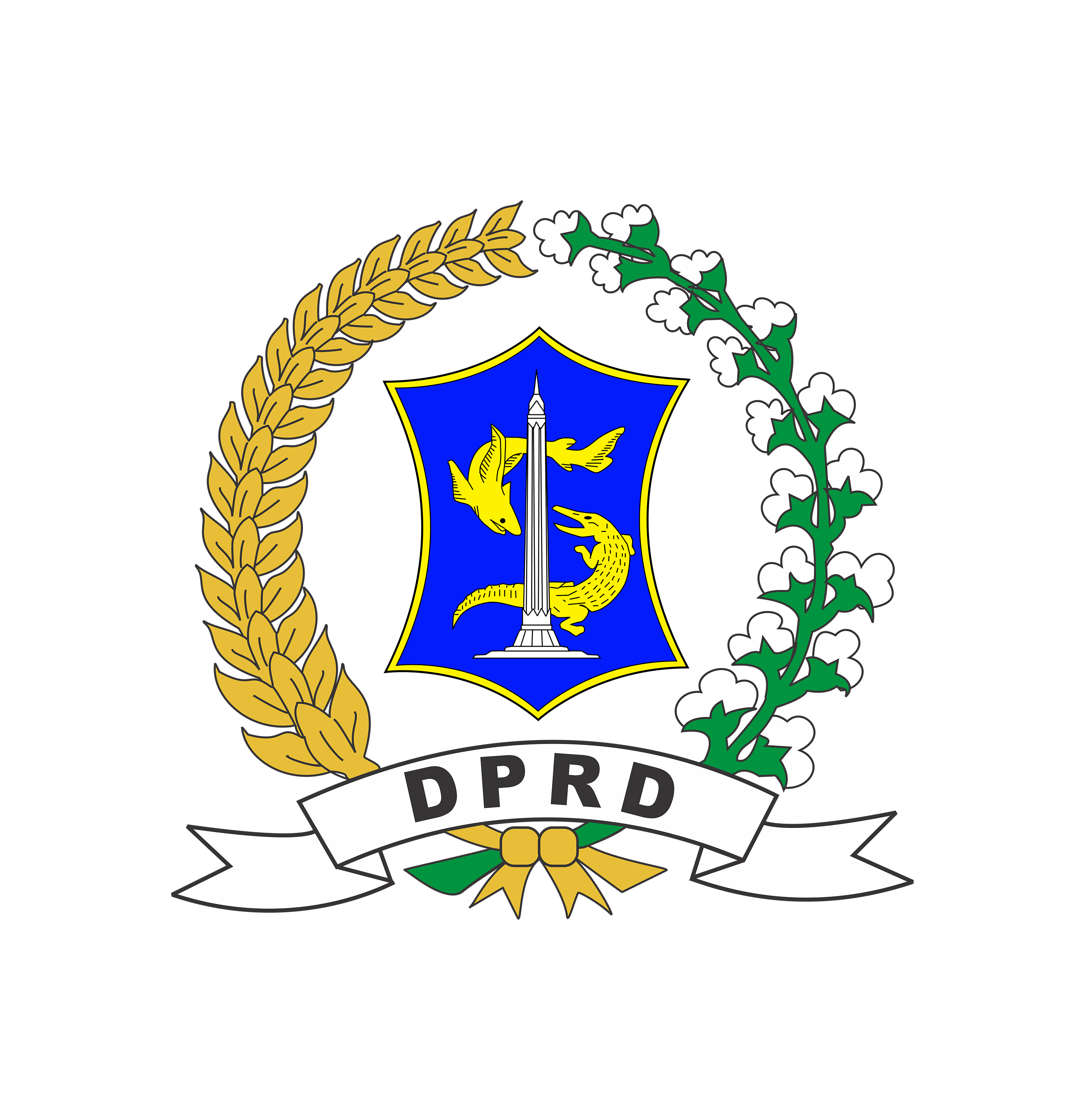

Type
- Type: Unicameral
- Term limits: 5 years

Leadership
- Speaker: Syaifuddin Zuhri, PDI-P since 6 May 2026
- Deputy Speaker: Bahtiyar Rifai, Gerindra since 17 Oktober 2024
- Deputy Speaker: Laila Mufidah, PKB since 17 Oktober 2024
- Deputy Speaker: Arif Fathoni, Golkar since 17 Oktober 2024

Structure
- Seats: 50
- Political groups: Government (50): PDI-P (11); Gerindra (8); PKB (5); Golkar (5); Democratic (3); PSI (5); NasDem (2); PAN (3); PPP (3); PKS (5)

Elections
- Voting system: Open list
- Last general election: 14 February 2024
- Next general election: 2029

Meeting place
- Surabaya City Regional House of Representatives building Jalan Yos Sudarso No. 18-22; Surabaya; East Java, Indonesia

Website
- dprd.surabaya.go.id

The Surabaya City Regional House of Representatives (Indonesian: Dewan Perwakilan Rakyat Daerah Kota Surabaya, Javanese: ꦝꦺꦮꦤ꧀ꦥꦼꦂꦮꦏꦶꦭꦤ꧀ꦫꦏꦾꦠ꧀ꦝꦲꦺꦫꦃꦥꦿꦺꦴꦮ꦳ꦶꦤ꧀ꦱꦶꦏꦸꦛꦯꦸꦫꦨꦪ, romanized: Dhéwan Pěrwakilan Rakyat Dhaérah Kuthå Suråbåyå, Madurese: ꦣꦮꦤ꧀ꦥꦼꦂꦮꦏꦺꦭꦤ꧀ꦫ'ꦪꦠ꧀ꦝꦌꦫꦃꦥꦿꦺꦴꦥꦺꦤ꧀ꦱꦶꦏꦺꦴꦛ꧀ꦛꦯꦺꦴꦂꦧꦗ, romanized: Dhâwan Pěrwakèlan Ra'yat Dâerah Kottha Sorbhâjâ, DPRD Kota Surabaya) is the unicameral municipal legislature of the city of Surabaya, East Java, Indonesia. It has 50 members, who are elected every five years, simultaneously with the national legislative election.

== History ==
During the Dutch East Indies period, Surabaya's city council was established on 1 April 1906 following a 1903 decentralization law. The council had 21 seats – 8 were European officials appointed by the colonial government, 7 were to be elected Europeans, 5 were appointed Native Indonesian officials, and another 3 were assigned to leaders of Chinese and Arab communities. The first members of the council were appointees, with the first election in 1909 being held for the 7 elected European legislators. The 1909 election had a registered electorate of just 1,398 Europeans (Surabaya's total population in 1905 was around 150,000), with a turnout of around 25 percent. While the council was intended to be led by the burgemeester (mayor), one would not be elected until 1916, and thus the council was led by the assistant to the Resident of Soerabaja. Together with the city councils of Semarang and Bandung, Surabaya's city council was the first in the Dutch East Indies to have elected women as councillors in 1938.

After the end of the Japanese occupation of the Dutch East Indies, Indonesian nationalists formed a 30-member "Indonesian National Committee" (Komite Nasional Indonesia/KNI) on 28 August 1945, with Doel Arnowo as chairman. The KNI only lasted for several months, until the Indonesian government in Surabaya escaped the city following the Battle of Surabaya. After Surabaya returned to Indonesian control after the handover of sovereignty, a Provisional Regional House of Representatives (Dewan Perwakilan Rakyat Daerah Sementara/DPRDS) was formed on 4 December 1950 and its appointed members sworn in on 7 December 1950. It initially had 25 members, but this was later increased to 30. The first Indonesian election for the legislature was held in 1957, with a repeat election in February 1958. The Indonesian Communist Party won 17 out of 35 seats in the council after the elections. The next election would be held in 1971, after the transition to the New Order, electing 33 legislators in addition to 6 armed forces representatives.

The legislature was based from the Resident's office until 1923, when it moved to a purpose-built city hall. It would remain there until 2020, when the legislature moved to a new building next to the city hall.

== General election results ==
=== 2024 Indonesian legislative election ===
The official valid votes received by political parties contesting the 2024 Indonesian legislative election in each electoral district (constituency) for members of the Surabaya City Regional House of Representatives are as follows.

2024 Indonesian legislative election results

Electoral district	PKB	Gerindra	PDI-P	Golkar	NasDem	Labour	Gelora	PKS	PKN	Hanura	Garuda	PAN	PBB	Democratic	PSI	Perindo	PPP	Ummat	Valid votes
Surabaya City 1	34,666	47,463	68,452	25,644	19,078	2,174	1,345	21,465	786	1,789	783	21,613	881	13,878	27,410	6,403	3,150	1,718	298,698
Surabaya City 2	41,004	44,308	70,872	34,945	16,149	2,113	2,211	25,635	614	1,691	806	22,533	959	22,141	16,792	4,548	16,328	2,142	325,791
Surabaya City 3	27,014	37,164	74,027	26,200	8,668	2,570	2,794	34,160	344	3,430	780	9,533	1,127	18,525	34,505	7,133	12,845	1,955	302,774
Surabaya City 4	24,545	47,260	66,252	27,892	7,497	2,865	2,314	30,314	521	2,805	849	20,101	1,448	13,763	24,742	6,636	4,544	1,845	286,193
Surabaya City 5	32,133	65,036	57,095	22,133	11,266	2,102	1,903	24,159	664	1,705	819	9,787	4,974	35,075	29,787	7,292	15,543	1,914	323,387
Total	159,362	241,231	336,698	136,814	62,658	11,824	10,567	135,733	2,929	11,420	4,037	83,567	9,389	103,382	133,236	32,012	52,410	9,574	1,536,843
Source: General Elections Commission of Indonesia

== Composition ==
2024 Surabaya Regional House of Representatives election results by constituency

As of the 2024 election, the council has 50 elected members, with 5 electoral districts. The current speaker is vacant, since Adi Sutarwijono of the Indonesian Democratic Party of Struggle died on 10 February 2026, he held the office since 24 August 2019.

Legislative period	Golkar	PDI-P	PPP	PAN	PKB	PD	PDS	PKS	PKNU	Gerindra	Hanura	Nasdem	PSI	Total
2009–2014	5	8	1	2	5	16	4	5	1	3				50
2014–2019	4	15	1	4	5	6	—	5	—	5	3	2		50
2019–2024	5	15	1	3	5	4	—	5	—	5	—	3	4	50
2024–2029	5	11	3	3	5	3	—	5	—	8	—	2	5	50

== Electoral District ==
In the 2019 Legislative Election and the 2024 Legislative Election, the Surabaya City Regional House of Representatives election was divided into 5 electoral districts as follows:

Electoral District Name	Electoral District Area	Number of Seats (2019)	Number of Seats (2024)
SURABAYA CITY 1	Bubutan, Genteng, Gubeng, Krembangan, Simokerto, Tegalsari	10	10
SURABAYA CITY 2	Kenjeran, Pabean Cantikan, Semampir, Tambaksari	11	11
SURABAYA CITY 3	Bulak, Gunung Anyar, Mulyorejo, Rungkut, Sukolilo, Tenggilis Mejoyo, Wonocolo	9	▲10
SURABAYA CITY 4	Gayungan, Jambangan, Sawahan, Sukomanunggal, Wonokromo	10	▼9
SURABAYA CITY 5	Asem Rowo, Benowo, Dukuh Pakis, Karangpilang, Lakarsantri, Pakal, Sambikerep, Tandes, Wiyung	10	10
TOTAL		50	50

== See also ==
- East Java Regional House of Representatives
- Surabaya
- East Java
