= Bambang Dwi Hartono =

Indonesian politician (born 1961)

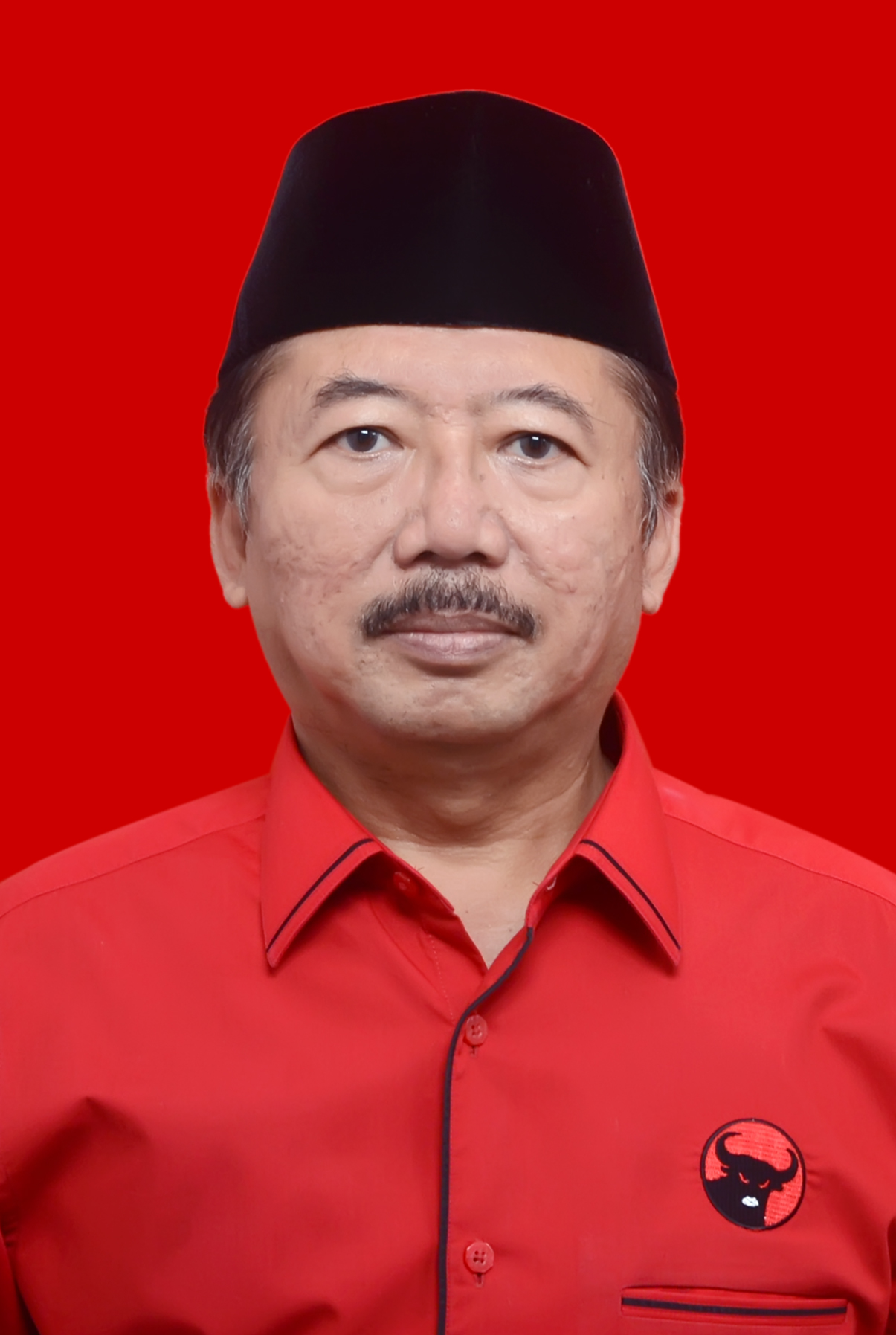

Member of People's Representative Council
- In office 1 October 2019 – 1 October 2024
- Constituency: East Java I

Member of East Java DPRD
- In office 31 August 2014 – 31 August 2019

14th Mayor of Surabaya
- In office 31 August 2005 – 31 August 2010
- In office 10 June 2002 – 7 March 2005; Acting: 16 January – 10 June 2002
- Preceded by: Sunarto Sumoprawiro
- Succeeded by: Tri Rismaharini

Vice Mayor of Surabaya
- In office 28 September 2010 – 14 June 2013
- Mayor: Tri Rismaharini
- Succeeded by: Whisnu Sakti Buana
- In office 7 March 2000 – 16 January 2002
- Mayor: Sunarto Sumoprawiro
- Succeeded by: Arif Afandi

Personal details
- Born: 24 July 1961 (age 64) Pacitan, East Java, Indonesia
- Party: PDI-P
- Spouse: Dyah Katarina
- Children: 3

Bambang Dwi Hartono (born 24 July 1961) is an Indonesian politician who is currently serving as a member of the People's Representative Council since 2019, representing the East Java I electoral district. A member of the Indonesian Democratic Party of Struggle (PDI-P), he previously served as a representative in the East Java Regional People's Representative Council from 2014 until 2019, the Mayor of Surabaya between 2002 and 2010, and the Vice Mayor of Surabaya from 2000 until 2002 and again from 2010 until 2013.

== Early life and education ==
=== Early life ===
Bambang Dwi Hartono was born on 24 July 1961, in Tegalombo village, Pacitan Regency.

=== Education ===
He studied Mathematics at IKIP Semarang.

== Political career ==
=== Early political career ===
Bambang was active in politics, initially supporting the Indonesian Democratic Party (PDI). He was one of the PDI cadres who recognized Megawati Sukarnoputri as the party's chairman during the 27 July 1996 incident. He eventually left the PDI to join Megawati Sukarnoputri's new Indonesian Democratic Party of Struggle (PDI-P).

=== First Vice Mayoralty ===
In 2000, Bambang was elected as the Vice Mayor of Surabaya with the re-elected Sunarto Sumoprawiro as Mayor. However, in early 2002, Sunarto was removed by the city council for abstentions and Bambang became acting mayor until he was formally appointed as mayor on 10 June 2002.

=== Mayor of Surabaya ===
Early in his tenure, Surabaya's city council voted to fire Bambang on 11 July 2002, but the Ministry of Internal Affairs in Jakarta continued to recognise Bambang as the mayor of the city. He ran with PDI-P for the city's first direct mayoral election in 2005. After winning the election, Bambang was sworn in as mayor on 31 August 2005.

During his time as mayor, Bambang engaged in populist projects, launching public projects to improve the city's drainage system and parks among others. In addition, under his time the city's government began providing free elementary and junior high education. Bambang was also supportive of the establishment of a bus rapid transit network in Surabaya during his time as Mayor, working with the Indonesian central government to implement the transportation system.

In addition, during his mayorship, Bambang was also the president of the football club Persebaya, until he was sanctioned for 10 years by PSSI for asking the club to resign from the quarter-finals of the 2005 Copa Indonesia.

In 2013, he was designated as a suspect for a graft case he allegedly committed in 2010.

=== Second Vice mayoralty ===
Before the expiry of his second term on 31 August 2010, Bambang ran as the running mate to Tri Rismaharini and the pair was successful, with Bambang being sworn as Rismaharini's deputy on 28 September 2010. After Rismaharini became mayor, she came up with a new spatial plan for the city which favoured rail-based transport over BRT systems, causing tension with Bambang.

=== Regional People's Representative Council ===
In 2013, Bambang resigned from his office to participate in East Java's gubernatorial election, though he lost after winning just 12 percent of votes. Afterwards, he ran for a seat in East Java's Provincial Council, securing a seat after winning 60,510 votes – the highest in the city – and was sworn in on 31 August 2014. Bambang was assigned to briefly lead PDI-P's Jakarta office in 2016. During his time in the position, he publicly opposed the party's selection of Basuki Tjahaja Purnama as Jakarta's 2017 gubernatorial candidate. During the time, he was also head of electoral affairs in the party.

=== People's Representative Council ===
Bambang ran as a candidate for the People's Representative Council from East Java's 1st electoral district in the 2019 Indonesian legislative election. He was elected with 123,906 votes. He ran for a second term in the 2024 election, but failed to secure a seat.

== Personal life ==
He is married to Dyah Katarina – who had served in Surabaya's city council – and the couple has three children.
