= Tri Rismaharini =

Indonesian politician; 31st Indonesian Minister of Social Affairs

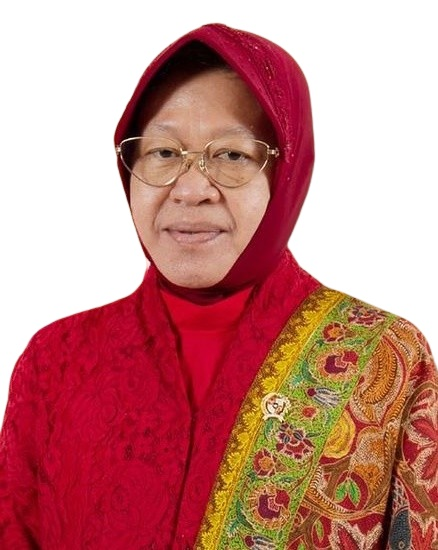
- Tri Rismaharini as Minister of Social Affairs

31st Minister of Social Affairs
- In office 23 December 2020 – 6 September 2024
- President: Joko Widodo
- Preceded by: Juliari Batubara
- Succeeded by: Saifullah Yusuf

15th Mayor of Surabaya
- In office 28 September 2010 – 23 December 2020
- Preceded by: Bambang Dwi Hartono; Soekamto Hadi (acting)
- Succeeded by: Whisnu Sakti Buana

Personal details
- Born: 20 November 1961 (age 64) Kediri, East Java, Indonesia
- Party: Indonesian Democratic Party of Struggle
- Spouse: Djoko Saptoadji
- Children: 2
- Education: Sepuluh Nopember Institute of Technology

Tri Rismaharini (born 20 November 1961) is an Indonesian politician who served as the Minister of Social Affairs in the Onward Indonesia Cabinet. She is the first female to be the Mayor of Surabaya. She is one of the leaders in the central executive board of the Indonesian Democratic Party of Struggle.

== Education ==
She earned a bachelor's degree in Architecture and a master's degree in Urban Development Management from Institut Teknologi Sepuluh Nopember, Surabaya. She was awarded a doctoral degree from Institut Teknologi Sepuluh Nopember in 2015.

== Career ==
=== Public service ===
Risma began her career as a low-ranking public servant in Surabaya. Before being elected as mayor, she served as a civil servant in the Surabaya City Government for more than 20 years, rose up to head of Surabaya's Program Controlling Division, and later head of Surabaya Landscape and Cleanliness Department.

During Risma's tenure, Surabaya enlarged open spaces such as cemeteries so that they serve as water absorption areas. The city has also added green lanes along main roads and created city forests. Risma's policies have been credited with reducing the severity and duration of floods, prompting calls for flood-prone Jakarta to emulate her policies.

Risma gained popularity for her surprise visits to local public service offices, where she criticized officials for their poor and inefficient performances, accusing them of "sinning" against the public.

=== Social Affairs Minister ===
On 23 December 2020, Risma was appointed as Social Minister under President Joko Widodo's cabinet, replacing Juliari Batubara who had been arrested for bribery. One of her first programs, announced on the day of her appointment, was to reform the aid distribution system by revamping the performance of data management and the social aid delivery system due to the COVID-19 pandemic in Indonesia, from physical cash handouts to a more transparent bank transfers. She resigned as the Social Minister on 6 September 2024, following her intention to run as a candidate for the Governor of East Java in the 2024 East Java gubernatorial election.

== Awards ==
During her tenure, Surabaya has won a number of awards including the ASEAN Environmentally Sustainable City Award 2012 and the Adipura Kencana, the highest environmental awards in Indonesia. Mayor Risma was named as one of the 10 most inspiring women 2013 by Forbes Indonesia. She was also recently named one of the world’s 50 greatest leaders by Fortune magazine and was one of the top mayors listed last year by the City Mayors Foundation, an urban research institute. March 2016, she was awarded Ideal Mother Award 2016, at Cairo University, given by Islamic Educational Scientific and Cultural Organization (ISESCO).

=== £4,000 vanity award ===
In April 2014, Risma and an entourage of six Surabaya officials flew to London to accept the so-called United Europe Award from the Europe Business Assembly, an organization which sells vanity awards. On 20 April 2014, Risma led a procession of eight open-air jeeps through Surabaya to show off the award, which officials described as a Socrates Award. Risma denied purchasing the award, explaining her side had merely paid a £4,000 participation fee. In 2019, she was given honorary Busan citizenship.

== Controversies ==
Risma's policy of closing down brothels has been criticized by aid and health care workers as ineffective, and doing nothing to eliminate the sex trade. Her critics add that making prostitution illegal forces many sex workers to work in conditions that are more dangerous and unregulated, and therefore more at risk from diseases. Her reforms have wide support in Indonesia, though.

In January 2020, Risma filed a police report against Zikria Dzatil, a woman in Bogor, West Java, for comparing her to a female frog in a Facebook post. “If I am a frog, that means my mother is a frog,” Risma said. Police responded by arresting Zikara on 31 January for allegedly violating the Electronic Information and Transactions Law. The following month, Risma withdrew the police report after Zikara apologized.

== Honours ==
- Star of Mahaputera, 3rd Class (Indonesian: Bintang Mahaputera Utama) - 2024
- Star of Service, 1st Class (Indonesian: Bintang Jasa Utama) - 2015
- Medal for Improving Regional Governance (Indonesian: Satyalancana Karya Bhakti Praja Nugraha) - 2015

== Electoral history ==
2015 Surabaya mayoral election
Party	Candidate	Votes	%	±%
PDI-P	Tri Rismaharini	893,087	86.34	+47.81
Demokrat	Rasiyo	141,324	13.66	N/A

2010 Surabaya mayoral election
Party	Candidate	Votes	%	±%
PDI-P	Tri Rismaharini	358,187	38.53	
Demokrat	Arif Afandi	327.516	35.25	
PKS	Fandi Utomo	129.172	13.90	
PKB	B.F. Sutadi	61.648	6.63	
Independent	Fitradjaja Purnama	53.110	5.71	
