= Eri Cahyadi =

Indonesian politician and bureaucrat (born 1977)

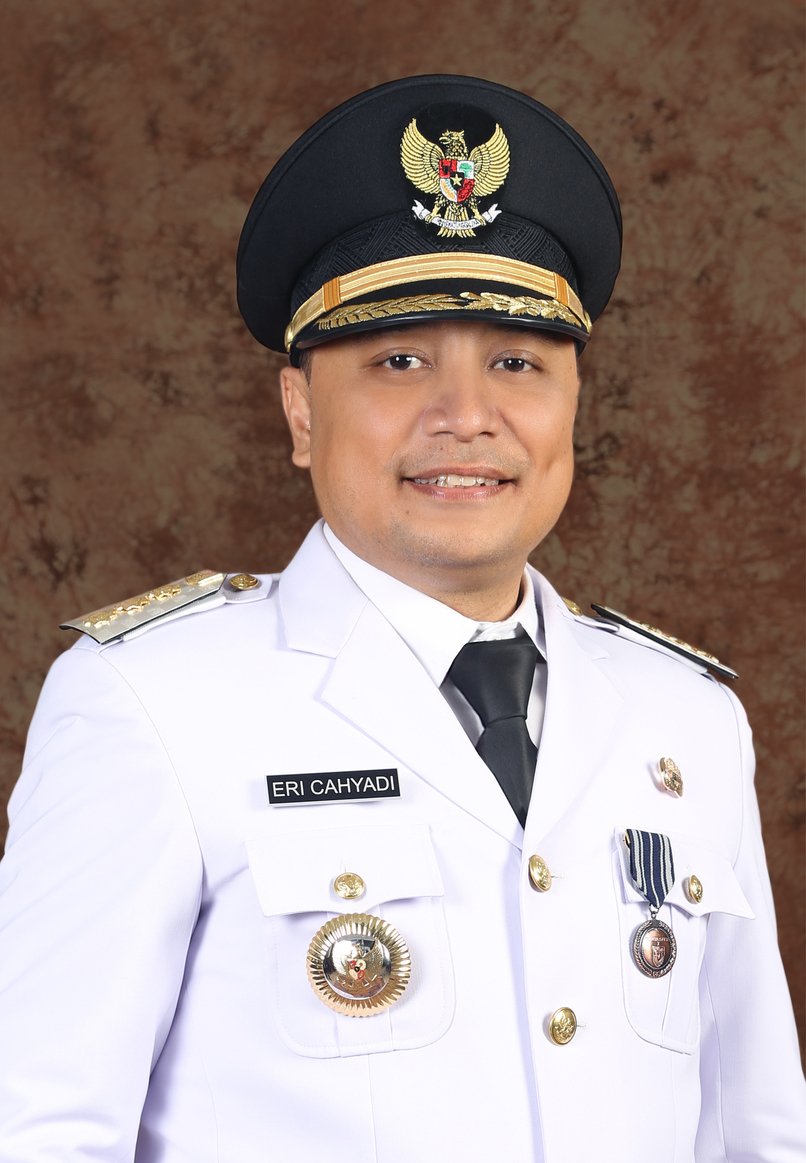
- Official portrait, 2021

17th Mayor of Surabaya
- Incumbent
- Assumed office 26 February 2021
- Deputy: Armuji
- Preceded by: Whisnu Sakti Buana

Personal details
- Born: 27 May 1977 (age 49) Surabaya, Indonesia
- Party: PDI–P
- Spouse: Rini Indrayani
- Children: 2
- Education: Sepuluh Nopember Institute of Technology (Dipl.); Adhi Tama Institute of Technology Surabaya (S.T.); University of 17 August 1945 Surabaya (M.T.)

Eri Cahyadi (born 27 May 1977) is an Indonesian politician and bureaucrat who has served as Mayor of Surabaya since 26 February 2021. He was elected in the 2020 Surabaya mayoral election.

== Career ==
Cahyadi graduated with a degree in civil engineering from the Sepuluh Nopember Institute of Technology in 1999, and after a 2-year career as a consultant he began working for Surabaya's municipal government in 2001. Both his parents had previously also worked as government officials.

By 2011, Cahyadi had been promoted to head the city government's public housing and urban planning department, and in 2018, he was appointed to head the municipal development planning body, in addition to heading the department of sanitation and public spaces. In order to run in the 2020 mayoral election, Cahyadi resigned as a civil servant and became a cadre of PDI-P. Cahyadi, who was endorsed by incumbent mayor Tri Rismaharini, won the election with over 57 percent of votes.
