= 2015 Surabaya mayoral election =

Local election in Indonesia

- 9 December 2015
- Turnout: 51.34%
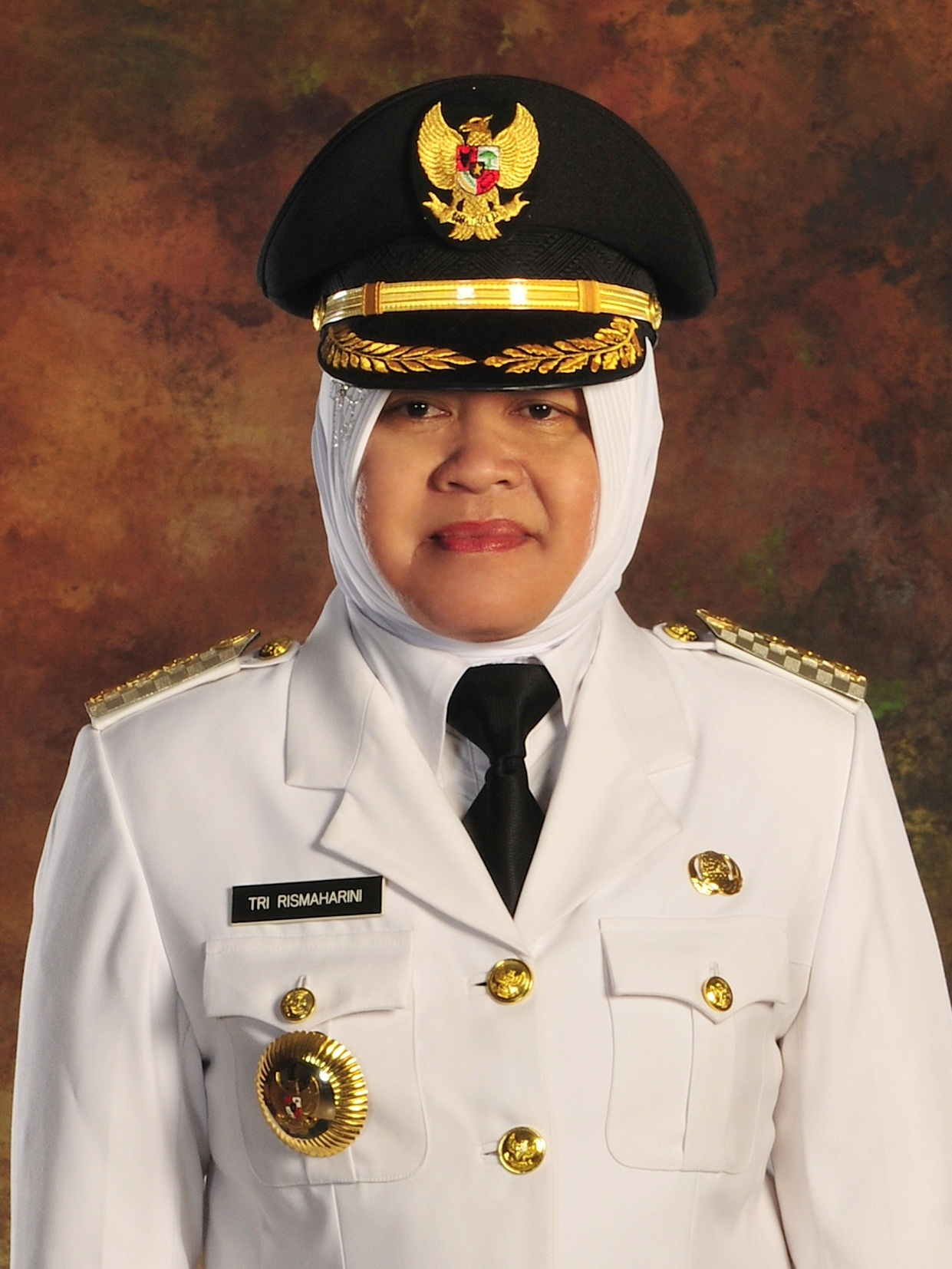
Nominee	Tri Rismaharini	Rasiyo
Party	PDI-P	Demokrat
Running mate	Wisnu Sakti Buana	Lucy Kurniasari
Popular vote	893,087	141,324
Percentage	86.34%	13.66%
Mayor before election
Tri Rismaharini
PDI-P
Elected Mayor
Tri Rismaharini
PDI-P

A mayoral election was held in Surabaya on 9 December 2015, as part of the 2015 simultaneous local elections across Indonesia. The incumbent mayor, Tri Rismaharini, popularly known as Risma, was running for re-election against the former Provincial Secretary of East Java, Rasiyo. Risma won by a landslide margin of over 70%.

== Candidates ==
Two candidates ran in this election.

- Incumbent mayor, Tri Rismaharini, running with the incumbent deputy mayor and former deputy speaker of the Surabaya City Council, Wisnu Sakti Buana. The ticket was supported by the Indonesian Democratic Party – Struggle (PDI–P).
- Former Provincial Secretary of East Java under Governor Soekarwo, Rasiyo, running with former member of the House of Representatives, Lucy Kurniasari. The ticket was supported by the Democratic Party (PD) and the National Mandate Party (PAN).

=== Nominations ===
The election was close to being postponed until 2017 as less than two candidates was registered by the end of the nominations period. At that point, there was no rules or precedence concerning walkover elections (the Constitutional Court ruled the legality of WO elections only on the end of September). Risma-Wisnu was the only pair who managed to submit nomination papers on time.

Before Rasiyo-Lucy was registered, two attempts were made to register a challenger to Risma. In early August 2015, the PD and PAN attempted to nominate former journalist, Dhimam Abror Djuraid, paired with Haries Purwoko. The registration failed after Haries withdrew in the last minute. As no other attempts were made until the end of the nomination period, the local electoral committee (KPUD) extended the nomination period until early September. Several weeks after the failed first attempt, Dhimas was nominated again, this time with Rasiyo as his running mate. The KPUD rejected their nomination due to errors in their nomination papers. The PD and PAN finally managed to register a ticket in their third attempt. On 8 September, Rasiyo, paired with Lucy Kurniasari, were registered in the KPUD, ending the saga and allowing the election to proceed as scheduled.

== Results ==
Risma's popularity allowed her to win re-election comfortably. Risma defeated Rasiyo by 86% to 14%, one of the biggest landslides in the 9 December elections.

Summary of the 9 December 2015 Surabaya mayoral election result
Candidates	Parties	Votes	%
Tri Rismaharini	Indonesian Democratic Party – Struggle (Partai Demokrasi Indonesia-Perjuangan)	893,087	86.34%
Rasiyo	Demokrat (Partai Demokrat)	141,324	13.66%
Total		1,034,411	100%
Valid votes		1,034,411	98.32%
Spoilt and null votes		17,630	1.68%
Turnout		1,052,041	51.34%
Abstentions		996,982	48.66%
Registered voters		2,049,023	
Source: Central Electoral Committee (KPU)
