= Bruce Rappaport =

International banker and financier (1922–2010)

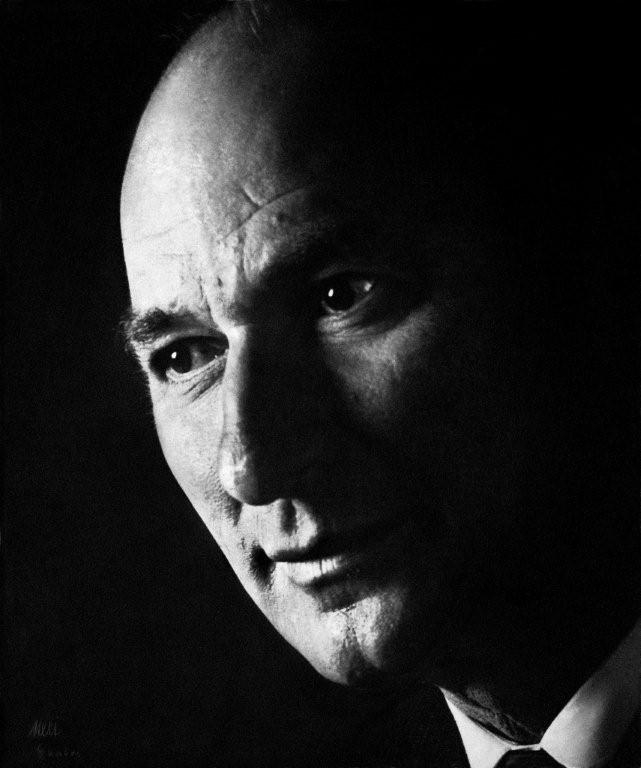
- Bruce Rappaport
- Born: Baruch Rappaport; 15 February 1922; Haifa, Mandatory Palestine
- Died: 8 January 2010 (aged 87)

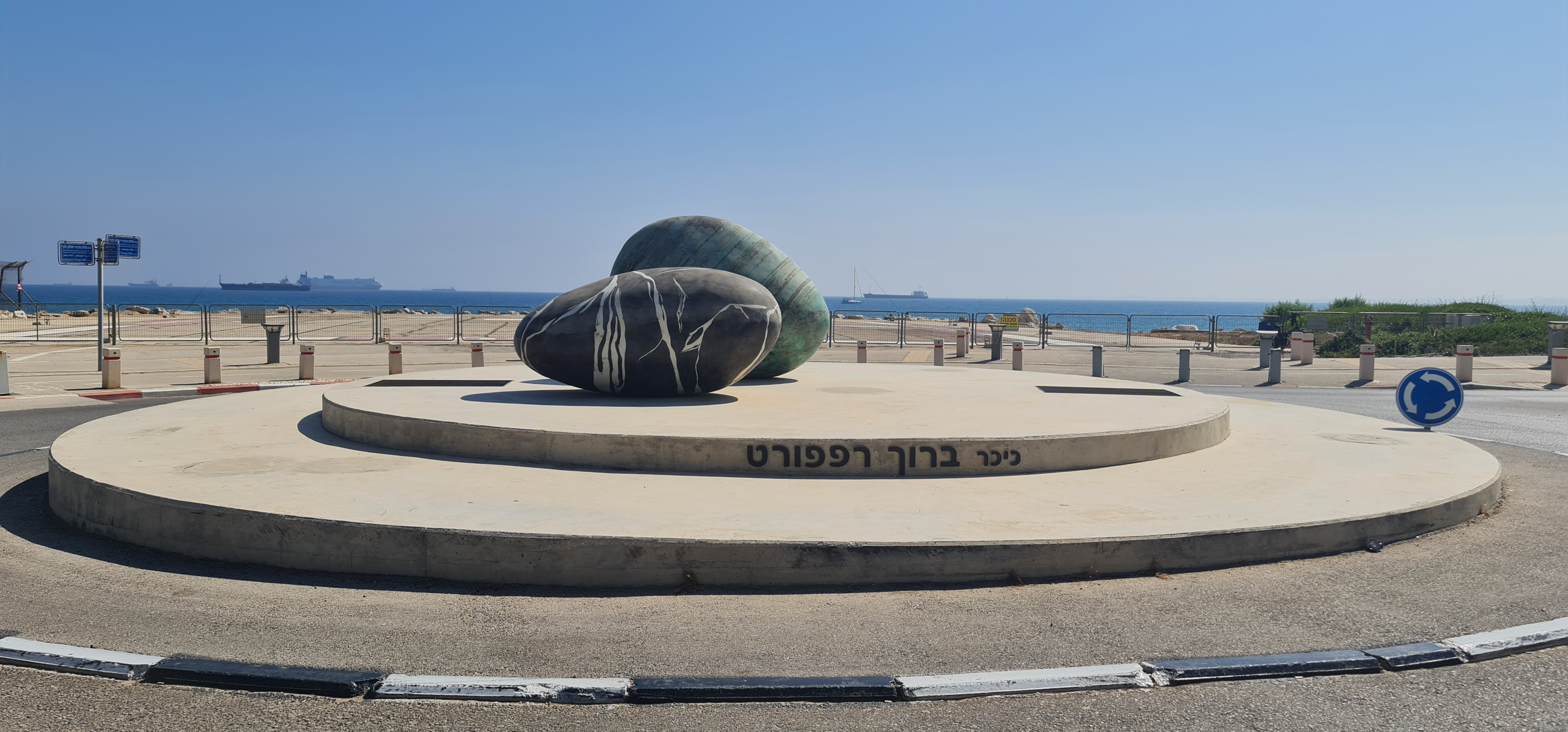
Baruch Rappaport Square near Rambam Hospital, Haifa

Baruch "Bruce" Rappaport (February 15, 1922 – January 8, 2010) was an international banker and financier. He was born in Haifa, Mandate of Palestine to Russian-Jewish emigre parents. He maintained a global business empire in the shipping and oil trading sectors through hundreds of shell companies registered in places like Panama, Liberia and Antigua and Barbuda. Rappaport was rumored to have contacts in transnational organized crime and to intelligence services such as the CIA and Mossad. He was a personal friend of former CIA director William J. Casey.

== Early life ==
Rappaport was born in Mandatory Palestine, to Russian-Jewish/Ukrainian-Jewish parents who built a cement business in their new homeland. He served in the British military and is believed to have fought for them in Africa during World War II. He also served in Haganah and the Israel Defense Forces. Rappaport was one of the founders of the Israeli military police and worked as a military judge after completing his legal training in 1953. After a fraud scheme with a local criminal was exposed, he fled Israel, acquired several passports and settled in Switzerland. In Geneva, he founded the Société Générale de Surveillance and the Swiss-Israel Trade Bank, allegedly with the help of Gideon Persk, brother of Shimon Peres and Mossad agents. In 1959, he founded International Maritime Services and International Maritime Supplies Company Limited, and built a global shipping and trading empire in partnership with the Greek shipping family Kulukundis. He was registered as a citizen of Panama, Costa Rica, Israel and Switzerland.

== Antigua ==
Bruce Rappaport was involved in banking, industry, and politics on the island of Antigua.

=== Swiss American Bank ===
In April 1983, Rappaport formed Swiss American Bank Ltd., later renamed Global Bank of Commerce, Ltd., and became the first licensed bank in Antigua governed by the International Business Corporations (IBC) Act of 1982.

In the 1990s, United States government authorities accused Swiss American Bank and the Swiss American National Bank, which were both located in Antigua, of money laundering proceeds from illicit drug profits.

The company was later sued by the United States for failure to release forfeited funds from one of its account holders. The lawsuit stemmed from a plea agreement with John E. Fitzgerald, who admitted to laundering $7,000,000 through numerous shell corporations and eventually deposited the funds in Swiss American Bank. Swiss American Bank, instead of returning the money to the United States Government, paid $5 million to the government of Antigua and Barbuda and deposited $880,000 into a bank account held at the Bank of Bermuda. Lester Bird, the former Prime Minister of Antigua, later told the US government, "We can't get you the records, they were destroyed in the hurricane".

On March 1, 2006, the government of Antigua and Barbuda brought legal action against its former prime minister Lester Bird, Bruce Rappaport, and other defendants. The lawsuit contended that Swiss American Bank, Bruce Rappaport, and others misappropriated over $41,000,000.

=== West Indies Oil Company (WIOC) ===
In 1980, a Rappaport controlled company by the name of National Petroleum Ltd purchased 440,000 shares of the West Indies Oil Company (WIOC) for $6,000,000 from the country of Antigua. The deal was negotiated by the former prime minister of Antigua, Lester Bird.

On May 30, 2010, the government of Antigua and Barbuda, using a $68 million loan from the Venezuelan firm, PDVSA, repurchased all of the shares to WOIC from National Petroleum Ltd

=== Guns for Antigua ===
Bruce Rappaport, Maurice Sarfati, and Yair Klein were involved in the Guns for Antigua scandal which involved the shipment of Israeli-made weapons through Antigua to the Medellin drug cartel in Colombia. The affair was exposed by the Louis Blom-Cooper Royal Commission, following the discovery that several murders in Colombia had been perpetrated with Israeli guns that had been shipped through Antigua and were ostensibly for the Antigua and Barbuda Defence Force, which is equipped for free by the United States.

Rappaport provided the financing, and the land on Antigua, for the melon farm that was used to funnel the weapons from Israel to Colombia via Antigua.

=== ‘Business’ activities in Russia ===
In his Putin biography, Philip Short reports that, in the 1990s, Rappaport “swindled the Mayor’s office [of the city of St Petersburg] out of millions of dollars after reneging on a contract to equip a container port for St Petersburg”, adding that he “had carried out similar scams in Odessa and Vladivostok”.

=== Ambassador to Israel and Russia ===
On December 3, 1997, Bruce Rappaport was appointed as Antigua and Barbuda's ambassador to the country of Russia.

=== Desalinization plant ===
In 2006, the Government of Antigua and Barbuda (GOAB), sued many former government officials and Bruce Rappaport. The suit alleged that Bruce Rappaport embezzled $14 million via his role in re-negotiating the desalinization plant. The cable states,

(c) The list of malefactors in the case is a veritable who's who from the Lester Bird government—Bird himself, senior party MP Asot Michael, former Antiguan High Commissioner to the UK Ronald Sanders (diplomat), Finance Minister John St. Luce, Treasury chief Keith Hurst, Public Utilities Minister Robin Yearwood, and Antiguan Ambassador to Russia and Israel Bruce Rappaport, along with some minor officials and ancillary characters. The firm's findings are still preliminary pending interviews with both the original lender (Ishikawajima-Harima Heavy Industries (IHI) Japan) and some of the accused, but the documentary and interview evidence obtained so far—including from a raid on Asot Michael's personal files—appears to be compelling for at least several of the key players.

In February 2009, the Government of Antigua and Barbuda announced a settlement agreement. Bruce Rappaport agreed to repay $12 million of the embezzled funds.

== Bank of New York ==
In 1982, Rappaport filed the required paperwork to declare his 7.5% ownership of Bank of New York.

On August 19, 1999, the Bank of New York (BoNY) admitted to co-operating with an investigation into a $10 billion money-laundering operation. Bruce Rappaport was a focus of the investigation and also his other bank, Bank of New York-InterMaritime, a Swiss bank that conducted a large amount of Russian business. Allegedly, his Bank of New York-Inter Maritime had money laundered money from Benex which had ties to Semion Mogilevich. In addition to Bruce Rappaport, another Bank of New York (BoNY) employee, Natasha Kagalovsky, who is married to Konstantin Kagalovsky, was a focus of investigations.

In 1999, a shareholder lawsuit was filed against the Bank of New York. In the complaint the accusations against Rappaport, and Bank of New York, included money laundering, accusations of Russian organized crime involvement, and described Rappaport as "an international financier of questionable background".

=== Bank of New York-InterMaritime ===
His Bank of New York-InterMaritime and the 1966 founded Inter Maritime Bank -Bank of New York, Geneva were closely involved in the ownership of the Vyborg port and shipyard prior to Ilya Traber (Russian: Илья Трабер) with support from Alexander Dobrovinsky (Russian: Александр Добровинский) gaining ownership of the facilities in 1994. (Note: By 1992, his Bank of New York-InterMaritime had a 28% ownership stake held by the Bank of New York.)

In 1990, Rappaport met with Mikhail Gorbachev who supported Rappaport's subsequent efforts in the modernization of 30 Soviet shipyards. Rappaport was the only foreign investor in the projects.

Jean Goutchkov, also spelled Ivan Guchkov (Russian: Иван Гучков; born 1954 Paris, France), who is a descendant of Alexander Guchkov, worked at Intermaritime Bank of New York before becoming managing director at Ferrier Lullin which was acquired by the Julius Baer Group in 2005 and then worked at HSBC. Goutchkov primarily serviced wealthy Russian clients.

In 1994, the Bank of New York (BoNY) in which Rappaport held its largest stake was assisted by Rappaport's Inter-Maritime Bank (IMB), Geneva through their joint venture the Bank of New York Inter-Maritime to give BoNY's chairman J. Carter Bacot contacts for access to Russia.

His Inter Maritime Bank -Bank of New York, Geneva had no branch in Antigua.

Boston attorney William Shaw McDermott represented Rappaport's interests in the United States through the Bank of New York - Inter Maritime Bank.

== Bank Menatap and Inkombank ==
Both Menatap and Inkombank are believed to have had business relationships with Rappaport.

== BCCI ==
In 1987, Independent Counsel Robert McKay investigated Bruce Rappaport for activities he engaged in on behalf of CIA director William Casey. These activities included the purchasing of an Antiguan melon-farm for Israeli arms dealers who were significant customers of BCCI in Miami and placing Alfred Hartmann (BCCI employee) on the board of directors of Intermaritime Bank of Geneva and New York.

Rappaport was also the person who allegedly controlled bank accounts which received $10 million for the Contras. Swiss authorities told the Iran/Contra Committees that the $10 million had disappeared, and was found to have "mistakenly" gone to a Swiss businessman, who then returned the money after the Iran/Contra affair was discovered. Press accounts contended that the businessman was Rappaport.

== Indonesia ==
During the early 1970s, General Ibnu Sutowo, signed numerous oil-tanker charter deals with Bruce Rappaport to provide oil transport for Pertamina.

In April 1977, General Ibnu Sutowo was placed under house arrest for his dealings with Rappaport. Rappaport was accused of price gouging and bringing Pertamina, and Indonesia, to bankruptcy.

== Iraq–Jordan pipeline scandal ==
During the 1980s, James McKay, an independent prosecutor, was appointed to investigate alleged financial improprieties by Edwin Meese while he was attorney general. As part of this investigation, McKay looked into Meese's involvement in a Bechtel pipeline deal in the Middle East. The pipeline was to extend from Iraq to Jordan and was negotiated by Edwin Meese, Shimon Peres, Bruce Rappaport, Robert C. McFarlane, and others.

During the investigation, Bruce Rappaport was offered immunity from prosecution as long as he did not perjure himself. Rapport later refused to attend his deposition for fear "he might not remember everything accurately".

Rappaport's alleged role was to bribe Israeli officials in the Shimon Peres government and ensure that portions of the $1 billion project were funneled to the Israeli Labor Party. Later, in 2006, Peres was investigated for an illegal $100,000 campaign contribution from Rappaport.

== Philanthropy ==
Bruce and his wife Ruth Rappaport contributed to the establishment of the Technion's Faculty of Medicine building (est. 1979), named the Rappaport Faculty of Medicine, and founded the Technion's Rappaport Research Institute. Upon his death, Technion released a statement thanking him for his contributions to the university.

In Geneva, Rappaport gave millions of dollars to Jewish and non-Jewish organizations, including orphanages, day care centers, research institutes and hospitals in the United States, Israel and elsewhere. His wife, Ruth Rappaport, was the co-president of the Geneva branch of the Women's International Zionist Organization.

Bruce and Ruth Rappaport also created the Bruce and Ruth Rappaport Foundation in 2006.

== See also ==
- Guns for Antigua
- Technion
- Semion Mogilevich
- Lai Kew Chai
- Ibnu Sutowo
