= Vere Bird Jr. =

Antiguan politician (1936–2013)

Minister of Agriculture, Lands and Fisheries
- In office 2000–2004

Minister of Trade, Industry and Business Development
- In office 1999–2000

Minister of Science, Technology and Communications
- In office 15 May 1996 – 1999

Minister of Public Works and Communications
- In office 1 January 1987 – 10 May 1990

Minister of Aviation, Public Information and Public Utilities
- In office 15 May 1986 – 1 January 1987
- Succeeded by: Robin Yearwood

Personal details
- Party: Antigua Labour Party
- Profession: Politician, lawyer

Vere Bird Jr. (October 1936 – 31 March 2013) was an Antiguan lawyer and politician who served as chairman of the Antigua Labour Party (ALP) and a government minister. He was the son of Vere Bird, the former Prime Minister of Antigua and Barbuda, and brother of Lester Bird, who later held the same position.

Bird entered politics in 1981. Three years later he was elected to the House of Representatives and became Minister of Aviation, Public Information and Public Utilities. As minister, Bird conducted a purchase deal for Dominican water before being made Minister of Public Works and Communications on 1 January 1987. In this role, he oversaw the reconstruction of V. C. Bird International Airport, which was the subject of controversy. This led to conflict within the ALP, but Bird remained a minister. He was later removed from Cabinet after a scandal in which Israeli weapons, sold to Antigua and Barbuda, were found in the hands of the Medellín Cartel of Colombian drug smugglers. A report by Sir Louis Blom-Cooper recommended that he be prohibited from holding public office again.

Despite this decision, Bird returned to government on 15 May 1996 as Minister of Science, Technology and Communications, with a transfer to the Ministry of Trade, Industry and Business Development following the 1999 general election. In 2000, he became Minister of Agriculture, Lands and Fisheries and negotiated an end to the Antiguan boycott of agricultural goods from Trinidad and Tobago.

After the ALP lost the 2004 general election to the United Progressive Party, Bird remained involved in politics. He and six other senior ALP members were arrested in 2009 after an unauthorised May Day rally. They were charged with public order offences, and faced trial which was delayed after Bird had a seizure. He had two more seizures in 2010, after the trial, and died on 31 March 2013 of heart failure.

== Early career ==
Bird, the eldest son of Premier Vere Bird, first entered politics in 1981 when he served as an unelected security official during the general election. In the following election in 1984, Bird and his brother Lester were both elected to the House of Representatives after the Antigua Labour Party, led by their father, took 16 of the 17 House seats. Bird himself was victorious over George Walter, leader of the Progressive Labour Movement and former Premier of Antigua and Barbuda, gaining 912 votes to Walter's 358. Upon election, with his father as Prime Minister, he was given the Ministry of Aviation, Public Information and Public Utilities. As Minister he visited Dominica at the head of a four-person delegation that was dispatched to reach a deal on selling Antigua and Barbuda, a country lacking natural supplies, water. This business was concluded on 16 July 1984, when it was announced that Dominica would sell Antigua and Barbuda 2 million gallons of water every 10 days, at a cost of around 3 US dollars per thousand gallons.

A cabinet reshuffle on 1 January 1987 saw Bird replaced by Robin Yearwood as Minister of Aviation, Public Information and Public Utilities and becoming instead Minister of Public Works and Communications. This followed controversy over Bird's construction of a new airport, which the opposition charged was "grossly inflated" in cost; retired Grenadian judge Sir Archibald Nedd was appointed to investigate the project and look for signs of wrongdoing. The independent investigation concluded that Bird had been incorrect in his funding of the project, particularly in granting the contract to build the runway to a company in which he was a shareholder. This scandal threatened to topple the government, with eight ministers, including Bird's brother Lester, arguing that the Prime Minister should fire him.

This scandal led to the Labour Party splitting into two distinct factions, one led by the Prime Minister and one led by Lester Bird. Despite a general election not being due until 1989, there was widespread speculation that it would be called early. Despite this, no election was called until 9 March 1989, when the ALP were again victorious. With the Prime Minister delegating most of his work due to his advancing age, and instead spending time with his 27-year-old companion, the election was seen as a struggle for power between Bird and his brother Lester. Although Lester had long been the front runner with most powers delegated to him, Bird, described in The Guardian as "a more single-minded, figure, long resentful at being over-shadowed by his sibling", was still seen as a close competitor – one with control of the nation's army. After the election, both Bird brothers retained their respective positions in the Cabinet, but with the Prime Minister's health getting worse, the struggle continued.

== Scandal and removal ==
Bird's career in the Cabinet was ended by scandal in 1990 after a shipment of Israeli weapons to Antigua and Barbuda were received and then diverted to the Medellín Cartel of Colombian drug dealers. The scandal broke after the Colombian government publicly complained about the use of Antigua and Barbuda as a trans-shipment point; a diplomatic note from the Israeli government revealed that the weapons had been shipped at the apparent express instruction of Bird, who had given assurances that they would not be passed on to any third parties. The guns were actually ordered as part of a conspiracy by Maurice Sarfati and Yair Klein, who forged documents showing that Sarfati was an authorised representative of the Antiguan government and that the purchase of weapons had been approved by the Antiguan Minister for National Security, though that position did not exist. The plan was to set up a mercenary training camp on Antigua in order to train and supply Gonzalo Rodríguez Gacha's Medellin forces. The Prime Minister repeatedly refused to open an investigation, despite demands by community leaders and members of his own government, saying that "conclusive evidence" was needed. An investigation was finally ordered on 25 April, with Bird asking to be temporarily relieved of his position until the inquiry concluded.

The inquiry was run by Sir Louis Blom-Cooper; Bird was formally removed as a Cabinet minister on 10 May, the day Blom-Cooper arrived on Antigua. Blom-Cooper began work on 4 June, with Bird retaining a team of six lawyers for his defence; the inquiry, concluded in November, recommended banning Bird from holding public office for the rest of his life. The report was acted on and Bird was banned from becoming a minister again, although he retained his seat in the House. The report did not, however, recommend that Bird be forced to resign from the House or prosecuted criminally; it was felt that the public ridicule the guilty parties had been subjected to was punishment enough. Bird was later re-hired by the government, not as a Minister but as a special advisor to the Prime Minister on the subject of Public Utilities. After the Prime Minister finally retired and Lester became Antigua and Barbuda's leader on 5 September 1995, Bird was made Chairman of the ALP.

== Reappointment ==
Despite Blom-Cooper's recommendations that Bird never be allowed to hold public office again and strong opposition disapproval, he was made Minister of Science, Technology and Communications in a cabinet reshuffle on 15 May 1996. He soon found himself at odds with the Prime Minister; after the government announced plans to evict Thomas Bufton and his wife from Guiana Island, where they had lived for 32 years, in order to build a tourist resort, Bird began serving as the Buftons' lawyer. A dispute between Bufton and Bird led to a fight at Bird's law offices, during which he was shot in the mouth and taken to intensive care on 16 December 1997; this followed Bird speaking up for the Buftons' cause before voting in support of a motion to allow the police to evict them, using force if necessary. Bufton was later acquitted of attempted murder, but still evicted.

Following the ALP's victory in the 1999 general election, Bird was again appointed to the Cabinet, this time as Minister of Trade, Industry and Business Development. By July 2000, he had become Minister of Agriculture, Lands and Fisheries; in this role, he held talks with fishermen over the dumping of dredged material in the ocean and signed a trade agreement with Trinidad and Tobago to end a year-long ban on the import of Trinidadian produce.

== Time in opposition ==
The ALP government lost the 2004 election, with the United Progressive Party under Baldwin Spencer taking 14 of the 17 seats in House. A year later, Bird was ousted as Chairman of the ALP and replaced by Molwyn Joseph. Following an unauthorised ALP march on May Day in 2009 to protest the Spencer government, Bird and six other senior ALP figures, including the former Prime Minister, were arrested and charged with public order offences. They pleaded not guilty, but were convicted and fined. This followed severe delays after Bird had a seizure during the trial, his third since 2008. Two more seizures occurred in 2010, the second on 11 March 2010 in court, where Bird was defending an individual accused of grievous bodily harm.

On 31 March 2013, Bird died of heart failure, a few days after being separately diagnosed with liver cancer. The Antiguan government confirmed that he was to receive a state funeral.

== Personal life ==
Bird was the son of Vere Bird, the former Prime Minister of Antigua and Barbuda, who died on 28 June 1999. His siblings include Lester, also a former Prime Minister, Ivor, who owns a radio station, Curtis, a lawyer, Roswald, a teacher, and Lisette. Ivor was later found guilty of attempted drug smuggling after being caught with a 25-pound bag of cocaine at Antigua's main airport; he was fined 75,000 East Caribbean dollars. Bird's son, Vere Bird III, was convicted of driving offences in 2006.
