= Satrio Sastrodiredjo =

Indonesian Politician

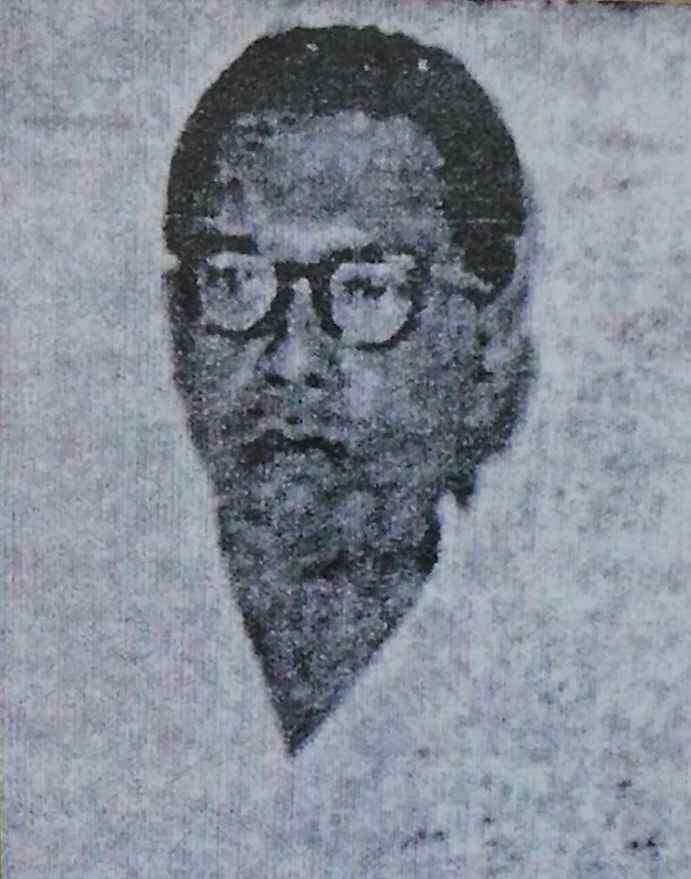

Vice Governor of East Java
- In office 22 May 1963 – 1965
- Preceded by: Mochamad Wijono
- Succeeded by: M. Soegiono (1977)

7th Mayor of Surabaya
- In office 30 June 1958 – 22 May 1963
- Preceded by: Istadjab Tjokrokoesoemo
- Succeeded by: Moerachman

Personal details
- Born: 14 June 1913 Purwodadi, Grobogan, Dutch East Indies
- Died: (time and place of died unknown)
- Party: Communist Party of Indonesia
- Education: Nederlandsch-Indische Artsen School (now Faculty of Medicine, Airlangga University) (dr.)

Satrio Sastrodiredjo (14 June 1913 – ?) was an Indonesian physician and politician of the Indonesian Communist Party. He served as the Vice Governor of East Java between 1963 and 1965, and previously as the mayor of Surabaya between 1958 and 1963. His political career was cut short after the 30 September movement and he was imprisoned.

== Early life ==
Sastrodiredjo was born in Purwodadi, Grobogan on 14 June 1913. He graduated from an Europeesche Lagere School (elementary school) in 1928, and a Meer Uitgebreid Lager Onderwijs (middle school) in 1932. He then enrolled at the medical training school Nederlandsch Indische Artsen School (NIAS) in Surabaya, graduating in 1942.

== Career ==
During the Japanese occupation of the Dutch East Indies, Sastrodiredjo worked as a physician for sugar companies in Situbondo. In the Indonesian National Revolution, Sastrodiredjo served as Junior Minister of Health in the Republican government under Amir Sjarifuddin. After the war, he worked at the municipal health department of Surabaya and later became the assistant director of the city's public hospital, while also lecturing at the faculty of medicine of Airlangga University. He became a member of the Indonesian Communist Party (PKI) in 1953. Following the 1955 national and 1958 local elections in Surabaya, where PKI made significant gains and came to dominate the city's legislature, Satrio was chosen as the city's first PKI mayor. He was sworn in as mayor on 30 June 1958. Although he was a PKI member, Satrio enjoyed good personal relations with U.S. consular staff in Surabaya.

His tenure as mayor of Surabaya ended on 22 May 1963 when he was appointed as the Vice Governor of East Java, with fellow PKI-backed candidate Moerachman replacing him as mayor. Following the 30 September movement and the ensuing purges against PKI, according to the U.S. Consulate in Surabaya, Sastrodiredjo had not been removed from his post by December 1965, although he was "staying quietly at home". He was eventually detained along with other political prisoners at the Kalisosok Prison in Surabaya. According to a letter by another political prisoner, Sastrodiredjo was tortured at Kalisosok. Moerachman was also imprisoned at Kalisosok, and is believed by Surabaya local historians to have died there and buried unmarked in Kalisosok Prisoner Cemetery within Kalisosok Prison walls. Little to none is known of Sastrodiredjo's fate afterwards. But later, by in 2020s, he largely believed by Surabaya local historians to be killed along with Moerachman, 7 regents from various regencies of East Java province suspected as PKI sympathizers, and also East Java Regional PKI leaders, politicians, and its affiliates during the purge. Due to censorship of PKI-related symbolism, his portrait along with those of Moerachman would not be displayed by the Surabaya municipal government until the tenure of Tri Rismaharini in the 2010s.

== Family ==
Sastrodiredjo was the younger brother of Ibnu Sutowo, who later headed the state-owned Pertamina oil firm. His wife was active in the Gerwani women's organization affiliated with PKI, and she was also detained by the army in 1965.
