= Sarekat Chauffeur Indonesia =

Labor union in the Dutch East Indies

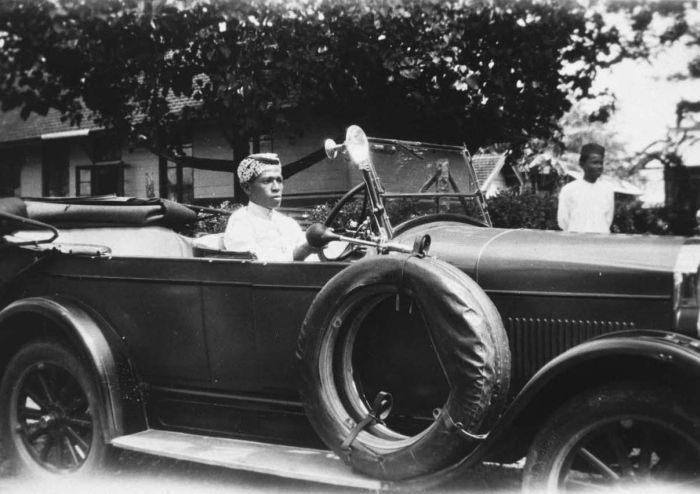
A chauffeur photographed in a car, c. 1930

The Sarekat Chauffeur Indonesia (SCI; transl. Union of Indonesian Drivers) was a labor union for taxi drivers in the Dutch East Indies which was founded in 1929. The union quickly expanded from its base in Surabaya to other towns in East Java and Central Java, claiming a membership of 1,080 by early 1931.

== Background ==
The Indonesian Study Club, an organization for politically active Indonesians, was established in 1924. By 1930, the Study Club was operating schools, held literacy courses, and had established a bank. The organization became an important forum in Surabaya for Dutch-speaking intellectuals and its buildings were used by political and religious groups in the city. The dominant figure in the Indonesian Study Club was Soetomo, a doctor and teacher at the local medical school, who believed in the maintenance of a "harmonious society" where the less educated should be led by a Western-educated elite.

Soetomo observed the failure of labor unions to establish themselves amongst workers in Surabaya. He became convinced that the Indonesian Study Club should get involved, as its strong leadership and resources would be more effective in fighting for better working conditions. However, Soetomo sought to develop "job conscious unionism" which stressed job security over class solidarity. Given the conditions of colonial exploitation, he believed that this was the way to achieve an independent and economically secure working class. On 12 July 1929, the organization established the Sarekat Chauffeur Indonesia (SCI) as a union for taxi drivers. It was the first union organized by the Study Club, though six other unions would be created by the middle of 1930. While the unions were based in Surabaya, their reach steadily expanded to nearby towns and later as far as Yogyakarta in Central Java. According to one estimate, membership in the unions expanded to around 2,000 by August 1930.

== Activities ==
=== Financial support ===
Like other unions organized by the Study Club, the SCI placed a focus on providing social and economic services to its members. It established a credit cooperative giving out small loans to cover emergency needs, such as fines by local courts. Taxi drivers preferred to borrow from the cooperative thanks to its low interest rates. For example, a six month loan was charged at only 9% interest compared to the 40% charged by other lenders. In total, the cooperative had lent almost 20,000 guilders in two and a half years. However, it did have some trouble with members who failed to repay loans, mostly amounts borrowed to pay fines.

Aside from borrowing, members also trusted the cooperative with their savings. During 1931, the cooperative received 1,664 guilders in deposits, with 515 guilders in its reserves by the end of the year. The SCI also introduced its members to the Indonesian National Bank, created by the Study Club, where they could obtain loans to buy vehicles and become owner-drivers. By the end of 1931, membership in the cooperative grew to 99 members, an increase from the 13 it had in April 1929. The financial services it provided led to the quick growth of the union, its membership growing to more than 250 taxi drivers in Surabaya alone, with hundreds more in other towns in East Java. By early 1931, the SCI claimed a total membership of 1,080 drivers. The next year, it expanded to Central Java — with branches in Semarang and Surakarta — and came into competition with the taxi driver union of the Islamic Union Party.

=== Legal support ===
The SCI held courses in Surabaya every fortnight which focused on practical matters, such as how to drive carefully and avoid fines. It also supported members when they got into difficulties. For example, Nitiasmora, a branch commissioner, was badly injured in a car accident. The SCI executive asked union members to visit him in hospital. When Nitiasmora's one-year old son died, the local SCI branch organized hundreds of members to attend the funeral. Furthermore, the union called on lawyers from the Indonesian Study Club when its drivers needed legal support. In 1931, an SCI member named Dardjan collided with a bicycle while driving from Tuban to Surabaya. The union represented him in court — even raising the cost of Dardjan's travel to Tuban for the hearing — which then found him innocent. In July 1932, the SCI successfully took up the case of a driver who had been made redundant without compensation. Following the case, the union proudly proclaimed "that the SCI does not merely make a noise but also works."

== Dissolution ==
In May 1930, the Indonesian Study Club established its own labour union federation, the Persatuan Sarekat Sekerja Indonesia (PSSI; transl. Federation of Indonesian Unions). The PSSI incorporated the Surabaya-based unions which were under the Indonesian Study Club's control. In December of the same year, the Indonesian Study Club transformed itself into the Persatuan Bangsa Indonesia (PBI, transl. Union of the Indonesian Nation). From 1931 onwards, the Great Depression heavily impacted labour unions throughout Java as membership decreased and funds dried up. The PSSI had entered 1932 with more than 5,000 members in affiliated unions, but by the end of 1933 it had no more than 500 members, ceasing to exist by 1934.

The leaders of the PBI decided to redirect their efforts from labor unions — though they still engaged in union activity, remaining active in the Surabaya union scene throughout the 1930s — to social and economic issues. For example, the PBI provided unemployment relief to unemployed workers in Surabaya. Labor unions began to grow again from 1936 onwards as the economy began to recover. Renewed efforts were made to organize workers in the private sector during the last four years of Dutch rule. The outbreak of the Pacific War and the threat of Japanese invasion following the attack on Pearl Harbor brought an end to Indonesian political and labor union activism. On 10 March 1942, the Royal Netherlands East Indies Army surrendered to the invading Japanese, beginning the latter's four-year occupation of the Dutch East Indies. Ten days after the surrender, the Japanese prohibited all political and labour union activity.
