= Guns for Antigua =

Political scandal

The Guns for Antigua scandal was a political scandal involving the shipment of Israeli-made weapons through Antigua to the Medellin drug cartel in Colombia. The affair was exposed by the Louis Blom-Cooper Royal Commission, following the discovery that several murders in Colombia had been perpetrated with Israeli guns that had been shipped through Antigua and were ostensibly for the Antigua and Barbuda Defence Force, which was equipped for free by the United States.

After the assassination of presidential candidate Luis Carlos Galán on 18 August 1989, Colombian police raided the home of cartel leader Gonzalo Rodríguez Gacha, where they discovered hundreds of IMI Galil rifles, including the one that had killed Galán. Colombia sought an explanation from Israel, and it was revealed the rifle was part of a consignment of 100 Uzi submachine-guns, 400 Galil assault-rifles and 200,000 rounds of ammunition that had been sold and shipped by Israel to the Antiguan government. On receipt of this explanation, the Colombian government issued a formal protest note to the government of Antigua. Vere Bird Sr. asked the Governor-General of Antigua and Barbuda to appoint a Royal Commissioner to investigate and, on advice from the British Foreign Office, he appointed Louis Blom-Cooper.

The Royal Commission under Blom-Cooper uncovered an international conspiracy to ship arms from Israel to Colombia via Antigua.

== Background ==
In 1983, Maurice Sarfati, a Lebanese-born Israeli, started a melon farm in Antigua on the approval of Vere Bird Jr, with whom he cultivated a friendship. The financing and land for the melon farm was provided by co-conspirator Bruce Rappaport. Between October 1984 and 1987, Sarfati was appointed to a number of governmental positions, including managing director of the State-owned airline. The melon farm expanded thanks to a series of promissory notes issued by the Antiguan government, totalling US$4 million. Sarfati set up a credit arrangement at the melon farm which allowed certain VIPs to withdraw US$1,000 in cash. Sarfati's secretary was directed to transfer payments of US$5,000 at a time to Vere Bird Jr and his wife. By 1988 the melon farm was US$7 million in debt.

In September 1988, Sarfati, along with Yair Klein (a retired IDF Colonel with links to Gacha) and Bruce Rappaport, presented a proposal to the Antiguan government (on behalf of Klein's security company Spearhead Ltd.) for a mercenary training camp designed to train ‘corporate security experts, ranging from the executive level to the operational level, and bring them to the highest professional capacity in order to confront and defuse any possible threat’ which was to be run by Klein. There was also to be a specialty shop where, at the end of the course, those trained at the camp could purchase arms and ammunition.

== Shipment ==
In an attempt to get out of bankruptcy, Sarfati, who was now living in Miami, and Klein contacted Pinchas Schahar (a retired Brigadier-General, then a representative of Israel Military Industries (IMI)). Klein placed an order for US$324,205 worth of Uzi submachine-guns, Galil assault rifles and ammunition on behalf of the Antiguan government, which was paid through various bank accounts belonging to the conspirators including Banco Aleman-Panameño; Philadelphia International Bank; Manufacturers Hanover Trust; Bank Hapoalim of Israel; and American Security Bank of Washington, DC. Sarfati produced forged documents showing that he was an authorised representative of the Antiguan government and that the purchase of weapons had been approved by the Antiguan Minister for National Security Vere Bird Jr, though that position did not exist. Concerns were raised at the Blom-Cooper Commission as to why questions weren't asked about why the Antiguan government dealt with IMI through Schahar instead of directly, as is common with governments, and why the Antiguan government was buying significantly more guns than there were men in the Antigua and Barbuda Defence Force and even more than the US equipped it with for free.

The weapons were loaded on the Danish ship Else TH, which sailed from Haifa on 28 March 1989, bound for Chile via the Panama Canal. It reached St. John's, Antigua and Barbuda, on 24 April and unloaded a container carrying the guns. The Else TH was primarily loaded with weapons for government troops in South America, including Colombia, and Antigua was a convenient first stop. However, whilst the Else TH was at sea, Diego Viafara Salinas, Gacha's personal physician, had defected to the Colombian security services and had produced a video apparently showing Klein running training camps for Gacha's cartel forces. This meant that the training school in Antigua could no longer be used to launder the guns for Gacha but because the shipment had already been paid for, Klein and Sarfati diverted a Medellín-owned ship, the MV Seapoint, from Haiti to Antigua to pick up the container with the guns to be delivered to Gacha. The container sat unguarded on the dockside for seven hours before the MV Seapoint arrived and collected it, before dumping it on a deserted beach in north-western Colombia, where the ship also picked up a 2½ ton shipment of cocaine.

== Aftermath ==
Following the report of the Commission, there were protests in Antigua and Barbuda with signs proclaiming "The Birds Must Go," which resulted in Vere Bird Jr resigning as Minister of Public Works. He was also barred from holding public office.

Klein was put on trial at the Jerusalem Magistrate's Court for three counts of exporting military equipment and expertise without the requisite licenses. Klein pleaded guilty and was convicted in late November 1990. During the trial, he explained that he pleaded guilty "to put an end to the witch hunt running rampant in some of the press, based on rumours and speculation which are harming the state and me." He claimed he had acted "in good faith and in the belief that my actions were within the law.".

Walker was dismissed by Vere Bird Sr from his position as ADF commander.

== See also ==
- Yair Klein
- Bruce Rappaport
- Lester Bird
- Vere Bird, Jr.
- Louis Blom-Cooper
- Geoffrey Robertson
- Israeli Military Industries
- Medellín Cartel
- José Gonzalo Rodríguez Gacha
