= MyPertamina =

Mobile app created by Pertamina

- Developer: PT Pertamina (Persero)
- Release: December 21, 2016 (outlets); August 7, 2017 (apps)
- Operating system: iOS, Android
- Size: 58.7 MB (iOS); 17.0 MB (Android)
- Available in: 2 languages
- List of languages Indonesian, English
- Website: MyPertamina.id

MyPertamina is a digital financial service platform from Pertamina that integrated with the apps LinkAja. This application is used for non-cash fuel oil payments at Pertamina's public fueling stations.

== History ==
Originally, MyPertamina were merchandise outlets of Pertamina products. It was launched on December 21, 2016, with 3 outlets in Jakarta. MyPertamina sells clothes, hats, and other products with Pertamina products brands. One month later (January 2017), Pertamina and Bank Mandiri entered into a partnership to launch the Mandiri Credit Card Pertamina Mastercard product, so that consumers can make payments when users fill up fuel at Pertamina gas stations.

In August 2017, MyPertamina app and electronic card were launched through MyPertamina Loyalty program at Gaikindo Indonesia International Auto Show 2017. The card can be used on EDC machines for non-cash payments. Initial balances are in its own app, that can be top up by ATMs and online banking.
