= Moerachman =

Indonesian politician (1929–1966)

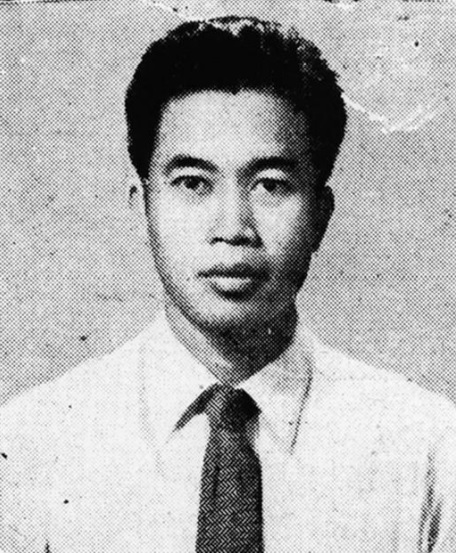
- Portrait of Moerachman as mayor

8th Mayor of Surabaya
- In office 13 December 1963 – 29 October 1965
- Preceded by: Satrio Sastrodiredjo
- Succeeded by: Soekotjo Sastrodinoto

Personal details
- Born: 25 November 1929 Banyuwangi, Dutch East Indies
- Disappeared: 1966 (aged 36–37); Surabaya, Indonesia

Moerachman (25 November 1929 – c. 1966) was an Indonesian politician who served as the mayor of Surabaya, East Java, between 1963 and 1965. Although not a member of the Indonesian Communist Party, he was strongly supported by the party during his political career. In the aftermath of the 30 September Movement, he was removed from his post, imprisoned and, allegedly after being escorted out of his cell by soldiers, disappeared—likely executed.

== Early life ==
Moerachman was born in the village of Benculuk, within modern Banyuwangi Regency of East Java. Prior to the Indonesian National Revolution, he had been a high school student.

== Career ==
In 1946, he joined the military police of the Indonesian National Armed Forces, and later became a battalion commander of a student unit in Besuki. His unit fought in the vicinity of Mount Argopuro and Mount Kawi later in the war. After the revolution, he enrolled at Airlangga University in Surabaya to study law, at one point serving as head of the law faculty's student senate. He led the Indonesian students' delegation to the students' conference of the Bandung Conference in 1955. He later became an assistant lecturer at Airlangga's law faculty. During his studies in Airlangga, he had also been active in the Consentrasi Gerakan Mahasiswa Indonesia organization affiliated with the Indonesian Communist Party (PKI). As a lawyer, he established the first legal aid service in Surabaya.

Moerachman was elected into the East Java Regional People's Representative Council in 1958. He was part of a progressive faction within the legislature. Contemporary files from the United States Department of State and a number of modern historians wrote that he was a member of PKI, while Indonesian historians disagreed. During his time as a councillor, he had begun to form ties with foreign communist states, travelling to Beijing twice before his appointment as mayor. When the previous mayor of Surabaya Satrio Sastrodiredjo accepted a posting as Vice Governor of East Java, President Sukarno appointed Moerachman to replace him as mayor, following Moerachman's endorsement by PKI and Central All-Indonesian Workers Organization. He was inaugurated as mayor on 13 December 1963.

During his tenure as mayor, he ordered the demolishing of one of two remaining "colonial" monuments in Surabaya – the Günther von Bültzingslowen monument – and ordered the construction of a replacement monument at its site dedicated to peasant farmers. Moerachman would be removed from office before the monument began construction. His tenure also saw an attempt by PKI-backed residents to squat on and seize vacant land for agriculture and housing, but due to orders from the central government, Moerachman resisted calls to certify the squatters. Moerachman took an openly pro-Communist stance during his mayoralship, among others addressing anti-American rallies and publicly supporting the boycott of American films. By May 1965, the USIS library in Surabaya had been seized by the municipal government.

== Imprisonment and disappearance ==
Following the 30 September Movement on 30 September 1965, Moerachman went into hiding as the Indonesian Army began purging PKI members. On 29 October, Moerachman along with a number of other PKI or PKI-backed mayors and regents were suspended from their posts by governor Mochamad Wijono, and Surabaya's military district commander Soekotjo Sastrodinoto took his post. According to one account, Moerachman was captured by army units in Wonokromo. He was jailed at Kalisosok Prison in Surabaya along with a large number of other political prisoners including his predecessor Sastrodiredjo, and Moerachman was likely killed. His grave is unknown. One fellow political prisoner wrote that Moerachman disappeared from the prison after being escorted out by soldiers one night in 1966. A number of other Kalisosok detainees escorted under similar circumstances had been executed and buried en masse. Some historians suggest that Moerachman died in Kalisosok and was buried in the prison complex.

During the Suharto presidency, the censorship of PKI-related symbols meant that successive mayors of Surabaya omitted Moerachman and Sastrodiredjo's portraits from official lists of Surabaya's mayors in publications and displays. By 2015, however, Surabaya's municipal government under Tri Rismaharini had allowed for their photos to be featured in an official city museum.

== See also ==
- List of people who disappeared mysteriously: 1910–1990
