= List of largest companies in Indonesia =

This article lists the largest companies in Indonesia in terms of their revenue, net profit and total assets, according to the American business magazines Fortune and Forbes.

== 2024 Fortune list ==
This list displays the top 20 Indonesian companies in the Fortune Southeast Asia 500, which ranks the largest companies in Southeast Asia by annual revenue. The figures below are given in millions of US dollars and reflect the fiscal year 2023. Also listed are the headquarters location, net profit, number of employees worldwide and industry sector of each company.

Rank	Name	Industry	Revenue (USD millions)	Profits (USD millions)	Employees	Headquarters	Type
1	Pertamina	Oil and Gas	75,788	4,441	40,415	Jakarta	SOE
2	Perusahaan Listrik Negara	Utilities	32,013	1,446	51,245	Jakarta	SOE
3	Bank Rakyat Indonesia	Banking	14,917	3,948	77,739	Jakarta	SOE
4	Bank Mandiri	Banking	11,515	3,616	36,872	Jakarta	SOE
5	Telkom Indonesia	Telecommunications	9,801	1,613	23,064	Jakarta	SOE
6	Gudang Garam	Tobacco	7,813	350	25,961	Kediri	Private
7	Bank Central Asia	Banking	7,371	3,195	25,486	Jakarta	Private
8	Indofood	Food	7,337	535	81,367	Jakarta	Private
9	Inalum	Aluminium	7,088	1,599	10,422	Batubara	SOE
10	Alfamart	Retail	7,025	224	195,757	Tangerang	Private
11	Adaro Energy	Coal mining	6,518	1,641	14,697	Tabalong	Private
12	Bank Negara Indonesia	Banking	5,448	1,373	27,570	Jakarta	SOE
13	Pupuk Kalimantan Timur	Fertilizer	5,207	407	7,441	Bontang	SOE
14	Dian Swastatika Sentosa	Mining	5,015	462	2,368	Jakarta	Private
15	Erajaya	Retail	3,950	54	5,675	Jakarta	Private
16	Bayan Resources	Coal mining	3,581	1,239	3,819	Jakarta	Private
17	Indah Kiat Pulp & Paper	Pulp and paper	3,479	412	11,000	Jakarta	Private
18	Indosat	Telecommunications	3,365	296	4,041	Jakarta	Private
19	Indika Energy	Oil and gas equipment	3,027	120	3,189	Jakarta	Private
20	Garuda Indonesia	Airline	2,937	250	4,401	Jakarta	SOE

== 2024 Forbes list ==
This table reflects the Forbes Global 2000 list, which ranks the world's 2,000 largest publicly traded companies. "The Global 2000" list is assembled based on factors including revenue, net profit, total assets and market value; each element is assigned a weighted rank in terms of importance when assessing the overall ranking. The table below also lists the headquarters location and industry sector of each company. The figures are in billions of U.S. dollars, for the year 2023. All nine Indonesian companies listed on "The Global 2000" are included in the table below.

Rank	Forbes 2000 rank	Name	Headquarters	Revenue (billions US$)	Profit (billions US$)	Assets (billions US$)	Value (billions US$)	Industry
1	308	Bank Rakyat Indonesia	Jakarta	14.9	3.9	125.5	46.5	Banking
2	373	Bank Mandiri	Jakarta	11.6	3.6	136.5	38.1	Banking
3	457	Bank Central Asia	Jakarta	7.5	3.3	91.1	75.3	Banking
4	912	Telkom Indonesia	Bandung	9.8	1.6	18.2	18.6	Telecommunication
5	944	Bank Negara Indonesia	Jakarta	5.4	1.4	67.3	12.1	Banking
6	1194	Bayan Resources	Jakarta	3.3	1.0	2.9	39.6	Coal mining
7	1591	Chandra Asri Petrochemical	Jakarta	2.1	0.0	5.4	49.3	Oil and gas
8	1605	Amman Mineral Internasional	Jakarta	2.0	0.3	9.9	46.6	Mining
9	1738	Adaro Energy	Jakarta	6.1	1.6	10.5	5.6	Coal mining

== See also ==
- Economy of Indonesia
- List of companies of Indonesia
- List of largest companies by revenue
