= Karen Agustiawan =

Indonesian businesswoman

- Born: Galaila Karen Kardinah; 19 October 1958 (age 67)
- Education: Bandung Institute of Technology
- Occupations: Former CEO and president director of Pertamina
- Spouse: Herman Agustiawan

Karen Galaila Agustiawan (born Galaila Karen Kardinah; 19 October 1958) is an Indonesian who served as the president director and CEO of Indonesia's state oil and gas company Pertamina between 2009 and 2014. In 2011, Forbes named her first on its list of "Asia's 50 Power Businesswomen".

== Early life and career ==
Agustiawan was born on 19 October 1958. She is the daughter of Dr. Sumiyatno, the first Indonesian envoy to the World Health Organization and former president of the Biofarma pharmaceutical company.

In 1983, she graduated from the Bandung Institute of Technology with a degree in Engineering physics. She had initially intended to become a professor, but at the urging of her father she decided to pursue a career in business. After graduating, she took a job at Mobil, working as a quality controller for seismic drilling projects. She later worked as a project leader in the company's Exploration Computing Department. In 1998, she left Mobil for Landmark Concurrent Solusi, the Indonesian branch of Landmark Graphics Corporation. As a result of Landmark's merger with Halliburton, Agustiawan was promoted to the project manager of oil and gas accounts in 2002. In 2006, she became the first woman head of Pertamina's upstream division. In February 2009 she was appointed CEO and president director of the company, making her the first female to hold the position. During her tenure as CEO she oversaw the development of alternative energy sources such as coal bed methane extraction and established a liquefied natural gas distribution system with Perusahaan Listrik Negara.

In June 2013 she was reappointed by the government for a second five-year term as CEO of Pertamina. She was the first CEO of Pertamina for many years to complete her full term.

In August 2014 it was announced that she had resigned. The minister for state-owned enterprises, Dahlan Iskan, was reported as saying that she had been offered teaching duties at Harvard University in the United States and that she would immediately take up the offer. At Harvard, she subsequently took up a position as an International Council Member within the Belfer Center for Science and International Affairs.

== Corruption issues ==
In January 2014, lawyer Rudi Alfonso alleged several legislators had threatened to have Karen fired if Pertamina did not give them money. “She has often received threats that she will be fired. But she never responded to such requests," he said. Rudi Rubiandini, the former head of Indonesia's upstream oil-and-gas regulator SKKMigas, had claimed Karen provided gratuities to members of the House of Representatives Commission VII on energy.

In April 2018, it was reported the Attorney General's Office had named Karen a corruption suspect in relation to Pertamina's investment in the Basker Manta Gummy (BMG) block in Australia in 2009. The alleged corruption was said to have caused state losses of Rp 568 billion (about US$40 million). She was sentenced to eight years of prison in June 2019. Karen immediately filed to appeal the verdict. The Supreme Court in 2020 accepted the appeal and overturned her conviction.

She was detained again in september 2023 allegedly being involved for ongoing graft investigation related to the company's procurement of liquefied natural gas (LNG) over the past decade.

== Personal life ==
She is married to Herman Agustiawan, who works at Indonesia's National Energy Council. They have three children.
