= Suharso =

Indonesian physician (1912–1971)

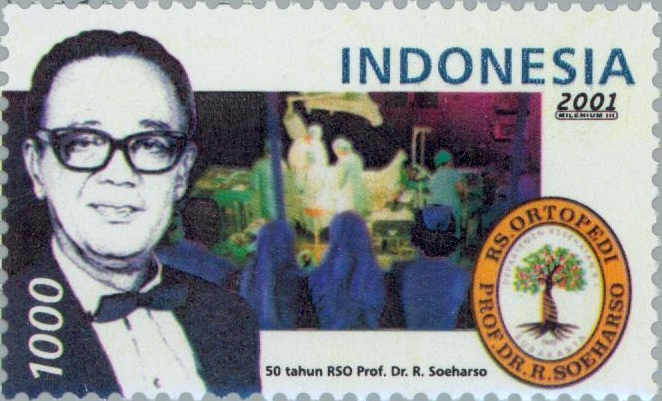
Suharso in a 2001 Indonesian stamp

Suharso (1912–1971), also spelled Soeharso, was an Indonesian medical doctor known for his work with disabled people and in the rehabilitation of people injured during the Indonesian National Revolution. He was declared to be a National Hero of Indonesia in 1973.

== Biography ==
=== Early life ===
Suharso was born in Ampel district, Boyolali Regency, Central Java, Dutch East Indies on 13 May 1912, at the foot of Mount Merbabu. His father was Sastrosuharjo, a police officer. The family partly owed their position and had land ownership in the village from Suharso's grandfather's services to the Surakarta Sunanate. In 1919 Suharso began his primary education in the Hollandsch-Inlandsche School (HIS) in Salatiga. He was still studying there when his father died in 1922. After graduating in 1926, he moved on to the Meer Uitgebreid Lager Onderwijs school in Surakarta, and after finishing there in 1930, to the Algemene Middelbare School in Yogyakarta. During his time at those schools, he also became a follower of the Jong Java movement and had an increasing interest in politics and science. He then continued his education at the Nederlandsch-Indische Artsen School (NIAS) in Surabaya. During his time there he also became interested in cultural matters and founded a Javanese cultural organization called Siwa Matoyo. Upon graduating from as a medical doctor from NIAS in 1939 he started to work at the central hospital (Centrale Burgerlijke Ziekeninrichting) in Surabaya. However, due to the subservient position of native doctors in the Indies, he was soon sent off to work in a less desirable position in the Eastern part of the Dutch East Indies. He was first supposed to be transferred to Sambas Regency, but at the last minute his transfer was changed to Ketapang Regency. It was there that he met his wife, Johar Insiyah. They were married in June 1941 in Pontianak, Ketapang.

=== Wartime and Indonesian revolution ===
During the Japanese occupation of the Dutch East Indies, in 1942, Suharso fled the hospital, and returned to Java where he started to work at a hospital in Surakarta. Intellectuals like him were being targeted by the Japanese as part of their occupation tactics; his wife's father back in Kalimantan was killed for that reason and the Japanese tried to use that as blackmail to force Suharso back to work in the hospital there. After the Indonesian Declaration of Independence in 1945, he continued to work for a time in the hospital in Surakarta, which was in Dutch-controlled territory, but also joined the Indonesian Red Cross Society and worked in the field in his birth region of Ampel district and towards Salatiga. He started to smuggle fighters on the Indonesian side in and around the region. It was during this time that he started to research medical techniques for rehabilitation of war wounded. In that era the only place in Java to get Prosthesis was in Bandung. Suharso began to recruit people to build prosthetic limbs as well as to develop techniques for rehabilitating injuries, and founded what would eventually become a rehabilitation centre.

=== After Indonesian independence ===
Suharso gained attention and support from the government of newly independent Indonesia, and in 1950 he got special funding to travel to England to research Orthopedics and Prosthetics at a higher level. Upon his return, he put into practice more advanced production techniques for prosthetics than had been previously possible in Indonesia. The arrival of a German prosthetics expert in 1954 in his centre also helped modernize their techniques once again. A 1953 newspaper article noted that the rehabilitation centre had roughly 400 patients and that it offered a number of retraining programs for different trades. In 1954, with an expansion of government pensions and social assistance for members of the Armed Forces, Suharso's Rehabilitation Centre was placed under the Ministry of Social Affairs and a new facility specifically for children (the Yayasan Pemeliharaan Anak-anak Cacad) was opened as well, followed by an Orthopedic clinic in the following year.

In the 1960s, Suharso continued to expand his efforts to build national support for disabled Indonesians who were not able to access the centre's services. In 1962, he founded the Yayasan Pembina Olah Rage Penderita Cacat (Indonesian: Sports Development Foundation for People with Disabilities) and in 1967 the Yayasan Balai Penampungan Penderita Paraplegia, a support organization for paraplegics, in Surakarta.

Suharso died on 27 February 1971, and was buried near his birthplace in Boyolali Regency. On 6 November 1973, he was declared to be a National Hero of Indonesia. He also became the namesake for the KRI Dr. Soeharso
