= Nederlandsch-Indische Artsen School =

Predecessor to Airlangga University

The Nederlandsch-Indische Artsen School (Dutch: Netherland Indies School of Physicians), commonly known by its initials NIAS, was a medical training school for Javanese and other Pribumi students which operated in Surabaya, Dutch East Indies from 1913 to 1942. After Indonesian independence, the school was incorporated into Airlangga University.

== History ==
Before the foundation of NIAS in 1913, in the nineteenth century, there was a type of training in the Dutch East Indies called Dokter Djawa, a form of rudimentary medical certification for Javanese people who were not permitted to attend European schools. That Dokter Jawa School, founded in 1851, began as a few rooms in the military hospital in Batavia; teaching was in Malay until around 1875, and after that in Dutch. In 1902, a more rigorous Dutch-medium medical program was launched in Batavia called the School for Training of Native Doctors STOVIA. The type of training given there was more rigorous and the students received the title 'Indies Physician' rather than Dokter Jawa.

NIAS was founded in 1913 in a residential house in Surabaya, East Java. The training it offered at first was very basic, as resources and teachers were in short supply during the First World War, and no student actually graduated until the early 1920s. After the end of the war, government funding was approved for the construction of a new building which would include an auditorium and library.

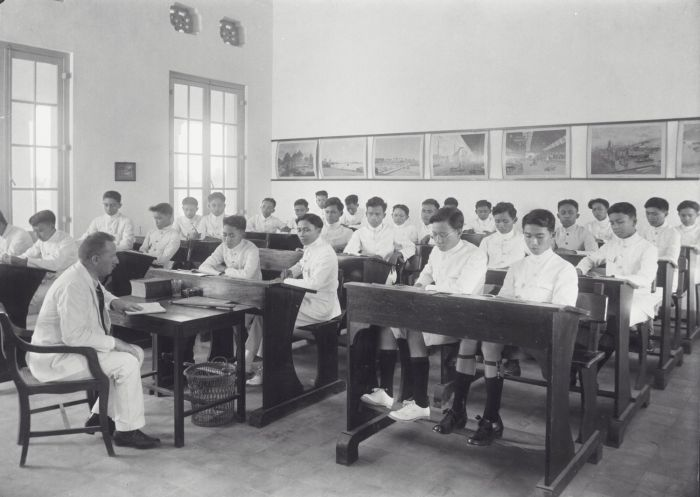
Classroom of the Netherland Indies School for Physicians (NIAS), Surabaya, Dutch East Indies, circa 1925

In 1923 the new purpose-built building was opened and the first cohort of certified graduates were sent out to begin their service. During the 1920s the institution hired a number of European-trained doctors as instructors, most famously Dr. Soetomo. In 1928 a new school of dentistry was established next door to NIAS, called School Tot Opleiding van Indische Tandartsen (STOVIT).

Upon the Japanese invasion of the Dutch East Indies in 1941, NIAS was closed. Students from the program were transferred to Jakarta and enrolled in a new Japanese-run medical school called Ika Daigaku.

After Indonesia achieved its independence from the Netherlands, the former NIAS was incorporated into a new university founded in Surabaya, Airlangga University, which was officially announced by Sukarno in 1954.

== Noteworthy graduates ==
- Ibnu Sutowo, independence fighter and cabinet minister under Suharto
- Suharso, doctor known for pioneering physical rehabilitation and prosthetics in Indonesia
- G. A. Siwabessy cabinet minister under Suharto
- Satrio Sastrodiredjo, Communist Party politician
