= Ibnu Sutowo =

Indonesian cabinet minister and military officer

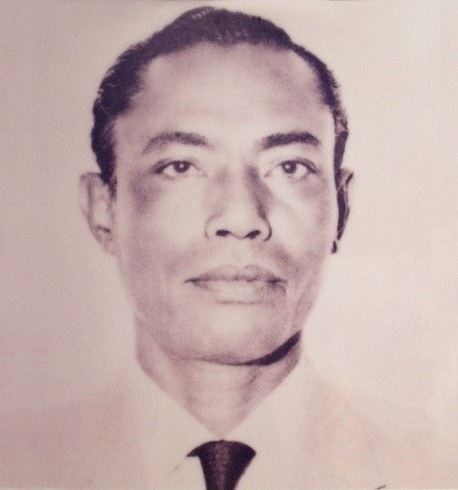
- Sutowo in 1966

Chairman of the Indonesian Red Cross Society
- In office 1986–1992
- Preceded by: Soeyoso Soemodimedjo
- Succeeded by: Siti Hardijanti Rukmana

Minister of Mines, Oil and Natural Gas
- In office 24 February 1966 – 25 July 1966
- President: Soekarno
- Preceded by: Armunanto
- Succeeded by: Slamet Bratanata

State Ministers Assigned to the Presidium
- In office 1 April 1965 – 21 February 1966
- President: Sukarno

President-Director of Pertamina
- In office 9 October 1968 – 3 March 1976
- Preceded by: Position established
- Succeeded by: Piet Haryono

Personal details
- Born: 23 September 1914 Cepu, Dutch East Indies
- Died: 12 January 2001 (aged 86) Jakarta, Indonesia
- Resting place: Kalibata Heroes' Cemetery, Jakarta
- Party: Golkar
- Domestic partner: Zaleha Binti Sjafe'ie
- Children: 7 (including Adiguna Sutowo)
- Parent(s): Soewondo Sastrodiredjo (father); Siti Komariah (mother)
- Education: Nederlandsch-Indische Artsen School
- Occupation: Military officer; businessman
- Known for: Role as President-Director of Pertamina

Military service
- Allegiance: Indonesia
- Branch/service: Indonesian Army
- Years of service: 1946–1976
- Rank: Lieutenant General

Ibnu Sutowo (23 September 1914 – 12 January 2001) was an Indonesian army officer, Cabinet Minister and former head of the Indonesian oil and gas producer Pertamina.

== Early life ==
Sutowo was born at Cepu, 23 September 1914. His father had been a regency head near the city of Semarang in Central Java. His privileged background at the time of the colonial Dutch East Indies allowed him to attend a superior Dutch school and then medical school in Surabaya.

== Education and early career ==
Upon graduation, Sutowo was assigned to a colony of Javanese transmigrants in Belitung in South Sumatra. During the Japanese occupation in World War II, Sutowo, like many indigenous Indonesians filling in for imprisoned Europeans, assumed many local administrative powers. By the time of Japan's surrender, he was a leader in irregular forces backing the Indonesian Republic in its fight for independence. On 12 September 1943, he married Zaleha, the daughter of a wealthy family.

In 1945, Sutowo was appointed a combined staff and medical officer of the republican army fighting the Dutch for the Palembang region's oil fields and plantations, and once Indonesia's independence was secured in 1949, he worked in the region's civilian health service whilst remaining in active army duty.

He was appointed head of the South Sumatra's Sriwijaya Division in 1955, a division which earned much revenue for the army during the independence struggle by smuggling vast quantities of rubber, tea, pepper and coffee to Singapore. Although the independence struggle was over by late 1949, the lucrative trade continued, and Ibnu benefited through his wife, Zaleha, who later succeeded in business in her own right.

== Military activities ==
The Army commander, General Nasution, recognised Sutowo's administrative skills and appointed him in 1956 as Chief of Logistics and subsequently added the position of Chief of Operations. He returned to Palembang to talk his former troops out of joining the Revolutionary Government of the Republic of Indonesia in Sumatra and Permesta in Sulawesi. His military prospects were thwarted by the 1958 Tanjung Priok smuggling scandal in which he was the main actor.

== Head of Pertamina ==
In 1957, Dutch assets in petroleum were nationalised, initially by communist insurgents who declared worker control of the refineries. In 1958, General Nasution crushed the communists and founded the corporation Pertamina, naming Sutowo as its head. Initially, Sutowo followed Sukarno's philosophy of Cold War non-alignment and self-reliance, insisting that foreign investors provide technology transfer in return for oil exports, and preferring independent oil companies to Western multinationals. He found common cause with the Japanese Indonesia hand Shigetada Nishijima, who began negotiations that year and signed a major agreement in 1960.

=== 1965 activities ===
Through 1962, Sutowo continued to eagerly support Sukarno's policy of self-reliance and nationalization, even though this was driving away major American, British, and Australian investors. However, the Indonesian economy began to falter under Sukarno's leadership. In 1965, Sutowo formed a small clique with Alamsyah Ratu Perwiranegara and Adam Malik, working to quietly undermine Sukarno's legitimacy among oil financiers and lay the groundwork to replace Sukarno with the military general Suharto. Shigetada Nishijima and the American oilman Langbourne Williams, having discussed with Sutowo beforehand, both quickly threw their support behind Suharto after the failure of the 30 September Movement. Sutowo served as Minister of Mines, Oil, and Natural Gas in Suharto's "New Order" emergency cabinets of 1966. Sutowo's younger brother had been the Communist mayor of Surabaya. The New Order's promotion of Sutowo despite his Communist connections was exceptional in this period of Communist purges.

=== Scandal ===
Using the proceeds from the 1970s oil price rises, he expanded the state run oil monopoly's interests far beyond oil production to include investments in oil tankers, steel and construction. Bruce Rappaport, an oil tanker broker, was accused of price gouging, and corruption, in a World Bank investigation of Ibnu and Pertamina. Rappaport settled more than $1 billion in claims against Indonesia for several hundred million dollars. The dispute included a $2.5 million loan from Rappaport's bank to Ibnu that had not been repaid. In 1976, Pertamina had built up debts of US$10.5 billion (equivalent to 30% of Indonesia's gross domestic product at the time) and was unable to service them. Ibnu was placed under house arrest pending an investigation, before being "dismissed with honour", and in 1978 the attorney general announced he had been found "not involved" in criminal activity. He continued to manage 37 private companies. Ibnu argued the Pertamina's financial "crisis" had been "manufactured" solely as a means to oust him.

== Death ==
Sutowo died on 12 January 2001 at Pertamina Central Hospital in Jakarta. Mourners who took part in ceremonies to pay their respects included Army Chief of Staff, General Tyasno Sudarso, Vice President Megawati Sukarnoputri, senior politician and member of the House of Representatives, Taufiq Kiemas, former president-director of Pertamina, Abdul Rachman Ramly, former Kostrad commanders Kemal Idris and Prabowo Subianto, and former vice-president Sudharmono.

== See also ==
- Pertamina
- Bruce Rappaport
