= Yair Klein =

Israeli mercenary

- יאיר קליין
- Born: 1943 (age 82–83); Israel
- Occupation: Arms dealer
- Organization: Spearhead Ltd
- Known for: Mercenary company

Yair Klein (Hebrew: יאיר קליין; also known as Jair Klein) is a former Israeli army 35th Paratroopers Brigade lieutenant colonel, who established a private mercenary company called Spearhead Ltd. Through Spearhead Ltd, Klein provided arms and training to armed forces in South America, Lebanon, and Sierra Leone. Klein and his company were accused of training the death squads of drug traffickers and right-wing militias in Colombia in the 1980s.

He was convicted by judicial authorities in Colombia for training several members of Colombian paramilitary groups and the militias of drug traffickers, including Gonzalo Rodríguez Gacha and Pablo Escobar Gaviria. The Colombian government made unsuccessful attempts to obtain his extradition from Israel. In a 2007 interview with Caracol TV, Klein claimed that he was sent to Colombia by request of the National Police in order to train its members, and stated that he was willing to go back and help destroy the FARC guerrillas. He also criticized the demobilization of the paramilitaries, saying it was "stupid" to do so while the guerrillas remained a threat.

== Guns to Colombia via Antigua ==
Klein, with the help of Bruce Rappaport, was heavily involved in the Guns for Antigua scandal of 1989, helping Maurice Sarfati launder guns from Israel through Antigua to Colombia, intending to supply Israeli-made weapons to the Medellin Cartel. He was also intended to run the training school for mercenaries that was to be set up on Antigua through which the guns were to be laundered, however, the plan was exposed before this could be set up. Klein was put on trial for three counts of exporting military equipment and expertise without the requisite licenses at the Jerusalem Magistrate's Court. Klein pleaded guilty and was convicted in late November 1990. During the trial, he explained that he pleaded guilty "to put an end to the witch hunt running rampant in some of the press, based on rumours and speculation which are harming the state and me." He claimed he had acted "in good faith and in the belief that my actions were within the law.

== Sierra Leone ==
Klein spent 16 months in a Sierra Leone prison between 1999 and 2000 on charges that he smuggled arms to rebels from the Revolutionary United Front, a rebel guerrilla army that fought a failed war in Sierra Leone from 1991 to 2002.

== Arrest warrant ==
On 3 April 2007 Interpol issued an international arrest warrant for Klein and two other Israeli collaborators, Melnik Ferri and Tzedaka Abraham, on charges of criminal conspiracy and instruction in terrorism.

== Arrest and extradition ==
Klein was captured by Russian Police in Moscow, Russia on 28 August 2007. The government of Colombia and its president, Álvaro Uribe, asked for his extradition to Colombia. He faced a sentence of 10 years and 8 months in a Colombian prison, with a bail of 22 Colombian minimum salaries. Klein was formally accused by a superior tribunal in Manizales for participating in the training and doctrine of illegal paramilitary groups. Despite the authorization given by a Russian tribunal to extradite Klein to Colombia, the European Court of Human Rights decided to suspend the surrendering of the suspect. According to Dmitri Yampolski, the legal representative of Klein, an eventual extradition of his client would have as a consequence that his rights and liberties would be violated. Yair Klein stated during trial in Russia that an extradition to Colombia is a "death sentence". The ambassador of Colombia in Moscow, Diego José Tobón, said that "these are just delaying measures and as any judicial decision it has risks, however in Colombia, detained persons are given all the guarantees and as a proof of that, Colombia has not received a single complaint of detained paramilitaries or other delinquents."

In November, 2010 Russian authorities decided to follow the ruling by the European Court of Human Rights and refuse extradition. Klein then returned to Israel, calling the international arrest warrant "complete nonsense" and announcing his intention to begin writing books. Colombian Justice Minister Germán Vargas Lleras stated that the Colombian government was "examining alternatives in order to enforce the verdict. The international community, including Russia and Israel, need to ask themselves how such things are allowed to happen."

== See also ==
- Paramilitarism in Colombia
- United Self-Defense Forces of Colombia
