= Louis Blom-Cooper =

English author and lawyer

Sir Louis Jacques Blom-Cooper QC FKC (27 March 1926 – 19 September 2018) was an English author and lawyer specialising in public and administrative law.

== Early life ==
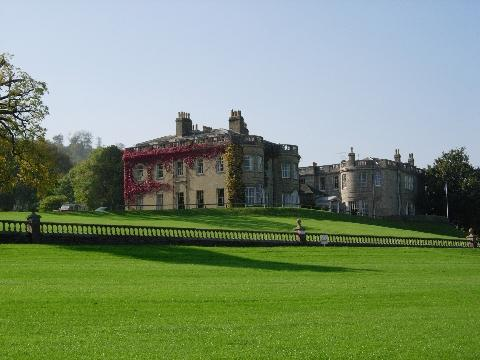
Seaford College

Born in London, his parents were the grocer Alfred Blom-Cooper and Ellen Flesseman. Blom-Cooper and his family were Jewish. He did national service as a Captain in the East Yorkshire Regiment from 1944 to 1947. Louis Blom-Cooper was educated at Port Regis School, Seaford College, University of British Columbia, King's College London (LLB,1952), the University of Amsterdam, and at Fitzwilliam College, Cambridge. He was called to the Bar at Middle Temple in 1952.

== Career ==
He was an academic at the University of London from 1962 to 1984. Prior to this he was a columnist for The Observer. He was Chair of the Mental Health Act Commission from 1987 to 1994 and a Judge in the Court of Appeal of Jersey and of Guernsey from 1988 to 1996.

He has chaired more than a dozen inquiries over the last decade including the Guns for Antigua scandal, and the Jasmine Beckford and the Ashworth Hospital Inquiries. He sat as a Deputy High Court Judge on housing and judicial review cases until 1996.

Blom-Cooper is well known for his regulatory work, particularly as Chair of the Press Council now the Press Complaints Commission and later as the founding chair of the premium rate telephony regulator, ICSTIS, later PhonepayPlus and now the Phone-paid Services Authority.

In 1992 he was appointed by the Secretary of State for Northern Ireland as the first Independent Commissioner for the Holding Centres. He held this appointment until April 1999. He was recently called to the Bar of Northern Ireland and granted Silk in Northern Ireland. He was also counsel to the Saville Inquiry acting for the Northern Ireland Civil Rights Association.

=== The A6 murder, Regina v. James Hanratty ===
In 1963 Blom-Cooper argued that James Hanratty was probably guilty. In 2002 modern testing of DNA from Hanratty's exhumed corpse convinced Court of Appeal judges that his guilt was proved "beyond doubt".

=== Hunter & Callaghan v Duckworth & Company and Blom-Cooper ===
The 1997 book The Birmingham Six and Other Cases considered recent miscarriages of justice. It prompted an unsuccessful libel action in the Irish courts from Gerry Hunter and Hugh Callaghan.

Initially Blom-Cooper argued that the publication of the book in Ireland was outside of his control. When this failed, he relied on European Convention on Human Rights#Article 10—right to freedom of expression and the newly formulated defence of Qualified privilege—provided good practice was followed it was acceptable to get things wrong. Previously inaccuracy would have led to financial penalty. Despite this, solicitor Gareth Peirce accused Blom-Cooper of "shoddy research" and "total nonsense" in respect of the book.

== Campaigner ==
Blom-Cooper was involved in the foundation of Amnesty International in 1961, supporting Peter Benenson's idea for an appeal for amnesty for political prisoners. It was at Blom-Cooper's suggestion that Benenson wrote to David Astor, proprietor of the Observer to publicise the campaign. Blom-Cooper also took part in a small committee of individuals who helped carry through the appeal which led to Amnesty International.

He was also a Patron of Prisoners Abroad a registered charity which supports Britons who are held overseas, and was a trustee of the Howard League for Penal Reform.

== Clubs ==
He was a member of the Athenaeum Club.

== Author ==
Blom-Cooper's published works include

- Bankruptcy in private international law (1955)
- The Law as Literature: An Anthology of Great Writing in and about the Law (1961) (as editor)
- The A6 murder, Regina v. James Hanratty: The semblance of truth (1963)
- The language of the law: An anthology of legal prose (1965)
- The Hanging Question: Essays on the Death Penalty (1969)
- Law and Morality (1976)
- The Case of Jason Mitchell- Report of the Independent Panel of Inquiry; Edited by Louis Blom-Cooper
- Occupational Therapy -An Emerging Profession in Health Care (1989)
- The Falling Shadow: One Patient's Mental Health Care 1978–1993 (1995) co-editors Elaine Murphy; Helen Hally
- The Birmingham Six and Other Cases (1997) (ISBN 0-7156-2813-5)
- Law and the Spirit of Inquiry : Essays in Honour of Sir Louis Blom-Cooper QC (1999) co-editors Charles Blake, Gavin Drewry
- With Malice Aforethought: A Study of the Crime and Punishment for Homicide
- The Court of Appeal (2007) co-editors Suzanne Fullbrook;Charles Blake
- The Penalty of Imprisonment: Why 60 Per Cent of the Prison Population Should Not Be There (2008), ISBN 1-84706-153-2
- Power of Persuasion: Essays by a Very Public Lawyer (2015)
- Public Inquiries: Wrong Route on Bloody Sunday (2017)
- Unreasoned Verdict: The Jury's Out (2019)

Media offices
Preceded by Zelman Cowen	Chairman of the Press Council; 1988–1990	Succeeded by Position abolished
