= Pertamina =

Indonesian state-owned energy holding company

PT Pertamina (Persero)

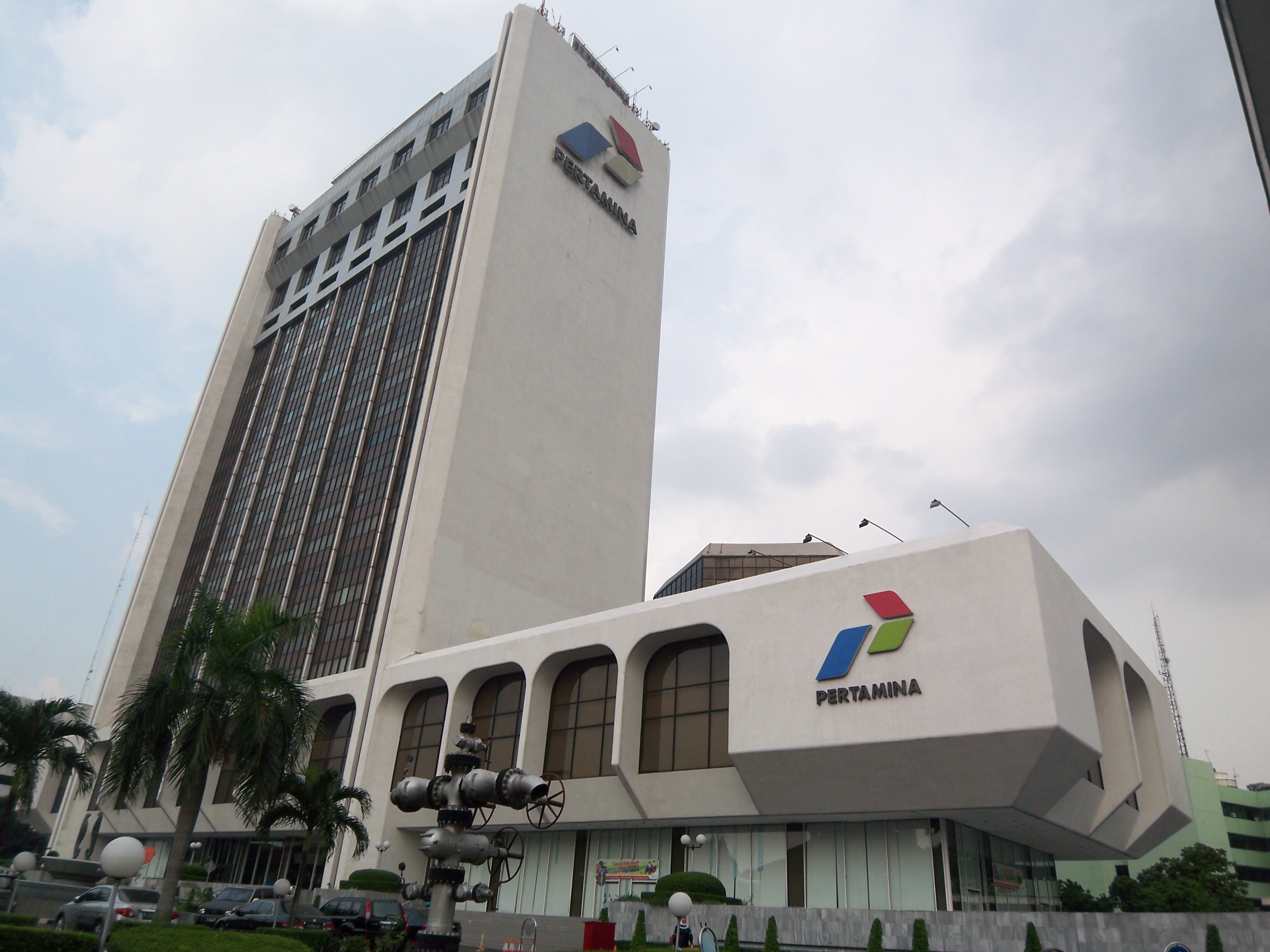
- Pertamina headquarters in Jakarta
- Formerly: PN Pertambangan Minyak dan Gas Bumi Nasional (1968–1971); Perusahaan Pertambangan Minyak dan Gas Bumi Negara (1972–2003)
- Type: State-owned perseroan terbatas Statutory corporation between 1968 and 1971; statutory corporation under special Act between 1972 and 2003
- Industry: Petroleum
- Founded: August 1968; 58 years ago
- Founder: Ibnu Sutowo
- Headquarters: Jl. Medan Merdeka Timur, Gambir, Jakarta, Indonesia
- Key people: Police Commissioner General (Ret.) Mochamad Iriawan (president Commissioner); Simon Aloysius Mantiri (president director)
- Products: Fuels, lubricants, petrochemicals
- Revenue: ▲US$ 84.89 billion (2023)
- Operating income: ▲US$ 4.1 billion (2023)
- Net income: ▲US$ 3.81 billion (2023)
- Total assets: ▲US$ 100.98 billion (2023)
- Total equity: ▲US$ 51.25 billion (2023)
- Owner: Danantara
- Number of employees: 13,526 (2020)
- Subsidiaries: See Subsidiaries
- Website: www.pertamina.com

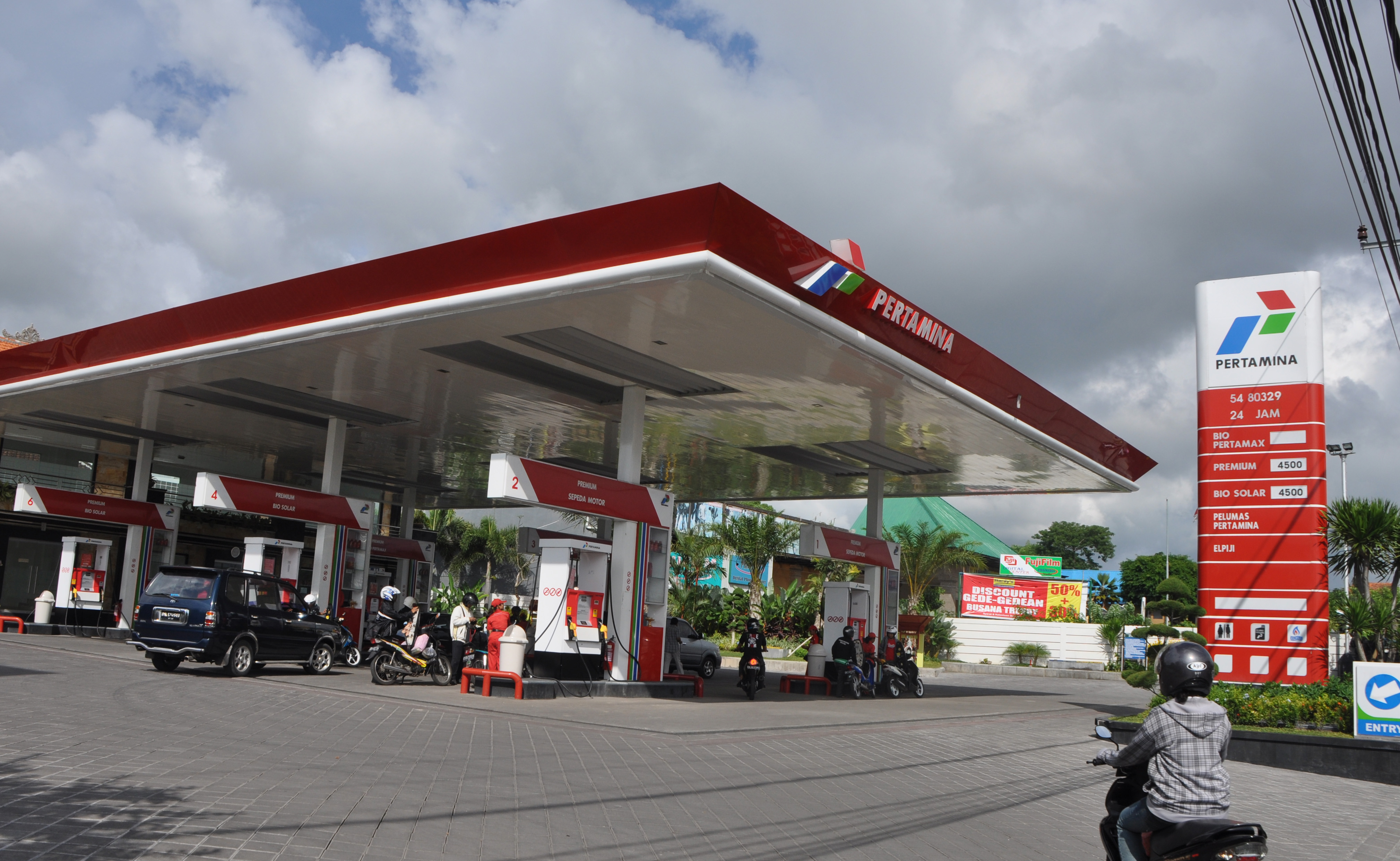
Pertamina fuel station in Bali

PT Pertamina (Persero) (Note: Formerly an abbreviation of Perusahaan Negara Pertambangan Minyak dan Gas Bumi Nasional (lit. 'National Oil and Natural Gas Mining State Corporation') between 1968 and 31 December 1971 and Perusahaan Pertambangan Minyak dan Gas Bumi Negara (lit. 'State Oil and Natural Gas Mining Company') between 1 January 1972 and 2003) is an Indonesian state-owned oil and natural gas corporation, headquartered in Jakarta. It was created in August 1968 by the merger of Pertamin (established 1961) and Permina (established in 1957). In 2020, the firm was the third-largest crude oil producer in Indonesia behind US-based companies ExxonMobil and Chevron Corporation. According to the 2020 Fortune Global 500 list, Pertamina is the largest company in Indonesia.

== History ==
=== Nationalization ===
In 1957, Royal Dutch Shell's assets in Indonesia (trading as Bataafse Petroleum Maatschappij) were nationalised, from which Permina was founded as a state-owned oil monopoly, headed by Lieutenant-General Ibnu Sutowo. Sutowo's position as the second deputy of Abdul Haris Nasution was the beginning of the armed forces' involvement in the oil industry. Permina distributed oil for the entire archipelago.

Permina founded the Apprentice Technical School (Sekolah Kader Teknik) in Brandan to train and produce experts in the field. In 1962, the company went on to establish the Oil Academy in Bandung. The academy's curriculum covered the technical aspects of the petroleum industry, and the graduates became the main source of labor for Permina (which was renamed Pertamin in 1961).

In 1960, the Provisional People's Consultative Assembly adopted a policy that oil and gas extraction could only be carried out by the state, through a state-administered company. Pertamin was responsible for the administration, management and controlling of the exploration and production. The policy was short-lived. An agreement between the state and foreign companies was affirmed that gradually, oil refinery manufactures and other assets in marketing and distribution were to be sold to Indonesia within five to fifteen years.

In 1968, to consolidate the oil and gas industry for its management, exploration, marketing and distribution, Permina and Pertamin merged and became PN. Pertamina. It continued to do little drilling itself but made production-sharing agreements with foreign companies.

=== The 1970s ===
After the merger, Pertamina's production rose considerably (about 15% each in 1968 and 1969, and nearly 20% in 1973). By the end of 1973, it produced 28.2% of Indonesia's oil, with agreements of Caltex and Stanvac to produce the rest (67.8% and 3.6%, respectively). Its assets included seven refineries, oil terminals, 116 tankers, 102 other vessels and an airline. It was also active in cement, fertiliser, liquid natural gas, steel, hospitals, real estate, a rice estate, and telecommunications.

The 1974 oil price increases produced revenues of USD 4.2 billion in that year, equivalent to approximately one-sixth of Indonesia's gross domestic product. Much of this revenue was used by Sutowo to expand Pertamina's interests far beyond oil production to include investments in oil tankers, steel and construction. Pertamina built the Bina Graha, the presidential executive office building in Jakarta. The global oil crisis of the 1970s greatly increased oil prices and thus Pertamina's profits. The company initially provided a fiscal lift to the hopes of Indonesia's development planners.

For President Suharto and other members of the ruling elite, revenue from Pertamina was "an ongoing source of funding" without accountability. "They ran this cash-cow into the ground, using it for both military and personal ends." Historian Adrian Vickers describes the endemic corruption at Pertamina:

"At each stage of the transaction chain, somebody was getting a percentage... If accidents occurred, as in 1972 when eighty impoverished people died... they could be covered up."

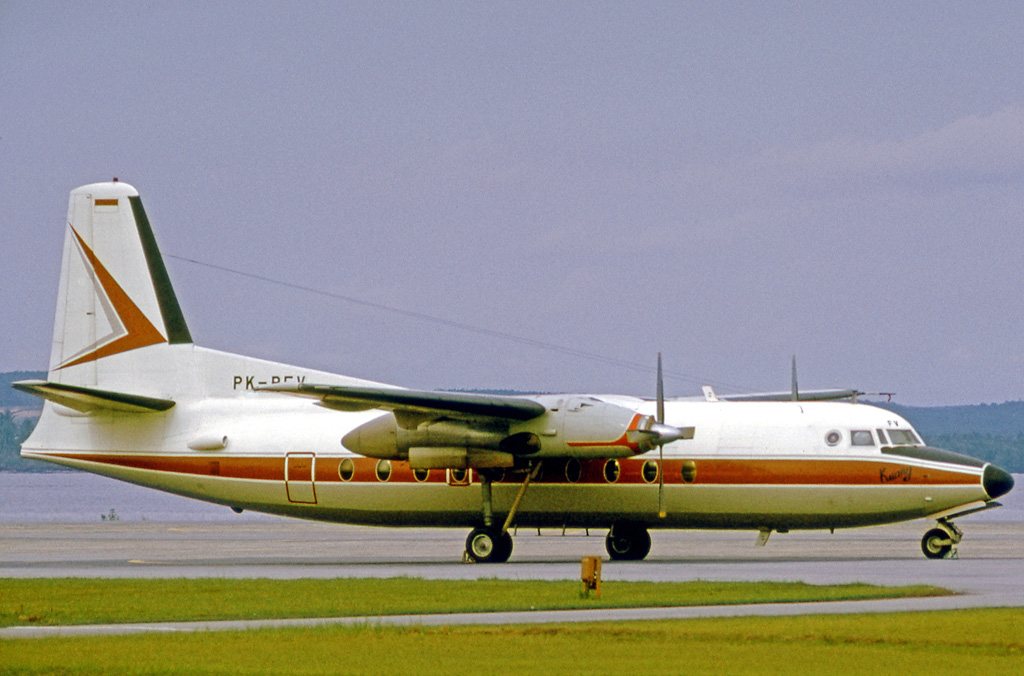
Fokker F.27 Series 200 Friendship of Pertamina used for transport of employees and equipment during the 1970s

In 1973, the government's ability to borrow money from overseas was constrained, and Pertamina was no longer providing revenues to the state. Instead, the massive enterprise turned out not to be making money but accumulating losses. In February 1975, Pertamina could no longer pay its American and Canadian creditors. An investigation followed, which revealed over US$10 billion in debt, mismanagement, and corruption within the company. This debt was equivalent to approximately thirty per cent of Indonesia's GNP at the time. Others offer a figure of a $15 billion debt. A public investigation damaged the reputation of the national elite both among Indonesians and foreigners.

However, charges against Ibnu Sutowo were dismissed and he and his family remained among the richest and most powerful in Indonesia, well into the 21st century. The government took over the operation of the company and sought means by which to repay its debts. Pertamina's debt problems were eventually solved through a large government bail-out, which nearly doubled Indonesia's foreign debt.

=== Since the 1980s ===
Human rights observers have long expressed concerns about Indonesia's hostility to labour unions. According to the Multinational Monitor: "In 1985, the government ordered the firing of over 1,600 workers at Pertamina and foreign oil companies, charging that they had been members of the Indonesian Communist Party, which had been permanently banned 19 years earlier when Suharto took power."

To execute a clause in the 2001 Oil and Natural Gas Act, in 2003 Pertamina legally became PT PERTAMINA (Persero), as per the enactment of Government Regulation No.31/2003. Pertamina is now under the coordinator of the State Minister of State-owned Enterprises.

Like other contractors, Pertamina holds a Cooperation Contract with the Oil and Gas Regulatory Body. With its transformation into a limited company, Pertamina has become a business entity with the main target of making a profit.

=== Corporate identity ===
In October 2020, Pertamina unveiled a new corporate identity, replacing its logo that had been in continuous use since the 1970s. The redesigned symbol was presented by management as representing the company's strategic transformation from a national oil and gas company into a global energy company, aligned with its stated ambition to achieve net zero emissions by 2060.

=== 2024 Pertamina LNG graft scandal ===
In June 2024, Karen Agustiawan, Pertamina's president director from 2009 to 2014, was sentenced by the Jakarta Corruption Court to nine years in prison for graft, surrounding the procurement of liquefied natural gas (LNG) from Cheniere Energy. News agency Antara estimates the that purchase contract resulted in state losses of Rp1.7 trillion (US$113.84 million). In August 2024, the conviction was upheld by the Jakarta High Court.

Other executives, including Yenni Andayani and Hari Karyuliarto, are also implicated and under investigation for their involvement in decisions that led to substantial financial losses. Luhur Budi Djatmiko, another former executive, faces scrutiny related to a separate corruption case involving a land purchase in South Jakarta that caused the state a loss of Rp348 billion.

=== Export-import and gasoline quality corruption scandals ===
On 25 February 2025, the Attorney General’s Office identified seven individuals as suspects in a corruption case involving state-owned energy firm Pertamina, its subsidiaries, and private contractors. The alleged misconduct, which occurred between 2018 and 2023, reportedly resulted in state losses amounting to Rp 193.7 trillion (US$11.9–12 billion).

The suspects include Riva Siahaan, CEO of Pertamina Patra Niaga; Yoki Firnandi, CEO of Pertamina International Shipping; and Sani Dinar Saifuddin, Director at Kilang Pertamina Internasional. Prosecutors claimed that the three executives bypassed a regulation requiring Pertamina to prioritize local crude oil purchases, instead opting for costly imports.

In response, the suspects justified these actions by asserting that domestic crude did not meet refinery specifications, despite evidence proving otherwise. Additionally, Pertamina International Shipping allegedly exaggerated crude oil transportation costs, marked up to 13%-15%, profiting Muhammad Kerry Andrianto Riza, one of the suspects from private sector. Oil trader Mohammad Riza Chalid, Muhammad Kerry's father, had his house in South Jakarta raided by prosecutors as part of the case investigation, even though he was not yet named as a suspect.

Additional suspects from the private sectors include: Dimas Werhaspati, Commissioner of PT Navigator Khatulistiwa and PT Jenggala Maritim; and Gading Ramadhan Joedo, Commissioner of PT Jenggala Maritim and PT Orbit Terminal Merak.

Investigations also uncovered that Pertamina Patra Niaga adulterated subsidized Pertalite RON 90 gasoline with the higher-quality Pertamax RON 92 and sold it at an inflated price, which was denied by Corporate Secretary of Pertamina Patra Niaga, Heppy Wulansari, on 26 February, without providing any proof.

On 25 February, member of House of Representatives (DPR) Eko Hendro Purnomo stated that the DPR will summon Minister of State Owned Enterprise Erick Thohir without providing any details on the date. Erick Thohir himself was too busy taking care of PSSI since he still was available to make comments on the Indonesian national team under 23 and under 20.

On 26 February, interviewed by Tempo, Universitas Gadjah Mada law professor M. Fatahillah Akbar stated that Pertamina consumers could take class action law suits against Pertamina both under criminal and civil law at the same time.

== President directors ==
During the 1970s, until 1976, the president director of Pertamina was Ibnu Sutowo, a well-known figure in Indonesia. Since then, there have been a number of president directors. Recent president directors have included the following:

No	Name	Term of office		Remarks
No	Name	Start	End	Remarks
1	Soegijanto	1996	1998	
2	Martiono Hadianto	1998	2000	Before his appointment as president director of Pertamina, Martiono was briefly Finance Director of the state-owned airline company Garuda Indonesia
3	Baihaki Hakim	2000	2003	Baihaki was formerly president of Chevron Texaco's subsidiary in Indonesia PT Caltex Pacific Indonesia. He was appointed as president director of Pertamina by the president Abdurrahman Wahid in 2000. Subsequent to his resignation in 2003, there was controversy surrounding decisions taken in Pertamina during his period as president director concerning the purchase of giant tankers for the transport of oil.
4	Ariffi Nawawi	2003	2004	
5	Widya Purnama	2004	2006	Widya Purnama was appointed from outside of the energy sector, formerly having been president (since 2002) of the Indonesian telecommunications company PT Indosat.
6	Ari Hernanto Soemarno	2006	2009	
7	Karen Agustiawan	2009	2014	In February 2009 it was announced that Karen Agustiawan would become president director of Pertamina for a five-year term. Her appointment was extended in 2013. She resigned for unannounced reasons in August 2014. It was said at the time that she had plans to teach in Harvard University in the United States.
8	Dwi Soetjipto	2014	2017	In November 2014, the new president of Indonesia Joko Widodo announced a major reorganisation of the board of Pertamina as part of a series of reform measures for the energy sector. A new president director, Dwi Soetjipto, was appointed along with a number of new members to the board. The appointment of Dwi Soetjipto, previously president director of the major state-owned cement firm PT Semen Indonesia, attracted media attention because unlike most previous president directors of Pertamina, he had little previous experience in the oil sector.
9	Elia Massa Manik	2017	2018	In March 2017, after Soetjipto was dismissed due to leadership issues, the Board appointed Manik who had served as president director of Elnusa, a Pertamina subsidiary, from 2011 to 2014. He then spent a period as the CEO of PT Perkebunan Nusantara (PTPN) III, the holding company of 14 state-owned agriculture firms.
10	Nicke Widyawati	2018	2024	In late August 2018, it was announced that president Jokowi had decided that Nicke Widyawati, who had been acting president director since March, would be confirmed in the position of head of Pertamina. The decision was announced at a press conference in the Ministry for State-Owned Enterprises on 29 August.
11	Simon Aloysius Mantiri	2024	present	Appointed by Minister of State-Owned Enterprises, Erick Thohir, under the Presidency of Prabowo Subianto, after briefly served as President Commissioner, when he was tapped to replace Basuki Tjahaja Purnama, who resigned from the post during the last stages of the Presidency of Joko Widodo, before the 2024 Indonesian general election.

== Facilities ==
=== Refineries ===
Pertamina has not built any new refineries since the Balongan refinery was opened in West Java in the mid-1990s.

PTT Public Company Limited and Pertamina signed into partnership to build a new petrochemical complex in Indonesia for an estimated cost of US $4 to 5 billion.

As of 2013, Pertamina operates six oil refineries which have a total combined capacity of around 1 million barrels (160 thousand cubic metres) of oil per day:

Pertamina: Refineries in Indonesia
No	Refinery Unit (RU)	Unit	Province	Capacity (10^{3} bbl/d)	Capacity (10^{3} m^{3}/d)
1	RU II	Dumai	Riau	127	20.2
2	RU III	Plaju (Musi)	South Sumatra	127	20.2
3	RU IV	Cilacap	Central Java	348	55.3
4	RU V	Balikpapan	East Kalimantan	260	41
5	RU VI	Balongan	West Java	125	19.9
6	RU VII	Kasim	West Papua	10	1.6
	Total			997	159

Source: Indonesian Ministry of Energy and Resources, 2012 Handbook of Energy and Economic Statistics of Indonesia.
(Note: By world standards, none of Indonesia's refineries are large. The world's largest refinery, at Jamnagar in India, has a production capacity of over 1,200,000 barrels (190,000 cubic metres) per day. As a rule of thumb, refineries need to produce at least 200,000 bbl (32,000 m^{3}) per day to reach reasonable international standards of efficiency.)

There are several other refineries in Indonesia which Pertamina has responsibilities for:

Other Refineries in Indonesia
No	Unit	Province	Capacity (10^{3} bbl/d)	Capacity (10^{3} m^{3}/d)
1	Sei Pakning	Riau	50	7.9
2	Cepu	Central Java	4	0.64
3	Tuban (TPPI)	East Java	100	16

Source: Indonesian Ministry of Energy and Resources, 2012 Handbook of Energy and Economic Statistics of Indonesia.

In addition to the refineries which Pertamina owns, Pertamina has invested in two operating companies that manage output from LNG plants.

- PT Badak LNG operates a plant in Bontang, East Kalimantan, with 8 trains having a total capacity of 22.5 million tons per annum.
- PT Donggi Senoro LNG in Uso Village, Batui Subdistrict, Banggai Regency, Central Sulawesi Province, with 1 train with a capacity of 2 million tons per annum.

Pertamina also invested in the PT Arun 6 LNG trains near Lhokseumawe, Aceh, which had a total capacity of 12.5 million tons per annum. They closed down due to a lack of feed gas in 2014, and now Arun has used an LNG import terminal.

During 2012 and early 2013, it was announced several times that there were plans to build two more large fuel refineries, each with a capacity of around 300,000 barrels (48,000 cubic metres) per day, perhaps in Balongan, West Java (or, alternatively, in Bontang, East Kalimantan) and in Tuban, East Java. The first facility was planned to be built by Pertamina in partnership with Kuwait Petroleum, while the second was expected to be built by Pertamina in co-operation with Saudi Aramco. Total investment was expected to be around $20 billion. One main problem holding up an agreement to build the refineries was the issue of financial concessions to be provided for the foreign investors. Eventually, in September 2013 it was announced that the plans for the first refinery had been cancelled. At the same time, the government said that there were plans for yet a different refinery project which would be constructed solely by Pertamina and funded by the state. The crude oil for this alternative project was expected to be supplied from Iraq. Pending further progress on these large investment plans, Pertamina has announced (late 2014) plans to upgrade the existing refineries so as to add around 500,000 bbl (79,000 m^{3}) per day to Pertamina's current refining capacity of around 1 million bbl (160 thousand m^{3}) per day.

Pertamina also has two gas reserves and a petrochemical company. Pertamina's products include a great variety of fuels, chemicals, additives, and retail products.

=== Gas station ===
Pertamina has the largest distribution network for petroleum products (gas stations, etc.) in Indonesia.

=== Bright Convenience Store ===
Along with the gas stations, Pertamina also has a convenience store chain, integrated with their gas stations. The development of Bright convenience stores and cafes is self-governed by PT Pertamina Retail.

== Subsidiaries ==
Pertamina has 27 subsidiaries.

- Pertamina EP

PT Pertamina EP (PEP) is engaged in exploration. PEP has also been undertaking other supporting businesses, which have been intended to back up the main business directly or indirectly.

Presently, Pertamina EP produces around 127.6 million barrels (20.3 million cubic metres) of oil per day and around 1,054 million cubic feet (29.8 million cubic metres) per day at standard conditions for gas.

Pertamina EP Working Areas of 140.000 km2 were once largely PT Pertamina (Persero)’s Oil and Gas Mining Authority Zone. The working areas are managed through its own operation and partnership co-operation.

Pertamina EP Working Areas consist of five assets. The operation of those assets comprise 19 Field Areas, namely Rantau, Pangkalan Susu, Lirik, Jambi and Ramba in Asset 1, Prabumulih, Adera, Limau and Pendopo in Asset 2, Tambun, Subang and Jatibarang in Asset 3, Cepu in Asset 4 as well as Sangatta, Sangasanga, Bunyu, Tarakan, Tanjung and Papua in Asset 5.

Besides the management of working areas as stated earlier, other business patterns include management through projects, such as Pondok Makmur Development Project in West Java, Paku Gajah Development Project in South Sumatera, Jawa Gas Development Project in Central Java, and Matindok Gas Development Project in Central Sulawesi.

- Pertamina Gas

Pertamina established PT Pertagas on 23 February 2007, and it became PT Pertamina Gas in 2008. The company undertakes gas transportation, trading and processing. In the gas transmission business, Pertamina owns a gas pipeline network with a total volume of 34,000 km-inches in Northern Sumatra, Central Sumatra, Southern Sumatra, Western Java, Eastern Java, and East Kalimantan

In January 2009, PT Pertamina Gas obtained a Transportation Permit and in February 2009, it received an exclusive right from BPH Migas for gas transportation along 43 transmission routes. These permits and exclusive rights complemented the business permit that had been issued previously (in September 2008). By obtaining a business license and special rights, PT Pertamina Gas now has a regulatory basis to play the principal role in the gas business in Indonesia.

- Pertamina Geothermal Energy

PGE was founded on 12 December 2006. This Pertamina subsidiary carries out geothermal exploration and exploitation in 15 working areas (WKP) in Indonesia, namely: Sibayak-Sinabung, Sibual-buali–Sarulla, Sungai Penuh-Sumurup, Tambang Sawah-Hululais, Lumut Balai, Waypanas-Ulubelu, Cibereum-Parabakti, Pengalengan (Patuha-Wayang Windu), Kamojang-Darajat, Karaha-Telagabodas, Dieng, Iyang-Argopuro, Tabanan-Bali, Lahendong-Tompaso and Kotamobagu. It went public in 2023 (IDX: PGEO).

- Pertamina EP Cepu

PEP Cepu, which was established on 14 September 2005, is a subsidiary of PT Pertamina (Persero) that focuses on the upstream oil and gas business. In the Cepu Block, Pertamina has a 45% interest in partnership with Mobil Cepu Ltd (as the operator) and the Regional Owned Enterprise (BUMD) that manages the KKS for the Cepu Block.

- Pertamina Drilling Services Indonesia

PT PDSI was established on 13 June 2008 as a drilling service management business entity. The services provided comprise drilling, workover activities, and drilling services that use a Daily Rate and Integrated Drilling Management (MPT) system for oil, gas, and geothermal wells.

Presently, PT PDSI owns 34 drilling rigs (28 owned by PT PDSI and 6 transferred from PT Usayana)

- Pertamina Hulu Energy

PHE is one of the Upstream Directorate subsidiaries working in the oil and gas upstream business and is also an upstream business vehicle for managing the domestic and overseas co-operation portfolio in the form of Production Sharing Contracts (PSC), Joint Operating Body-Production Sharing Contracts (JOB-PSC), Indonesian Participating / Pertamina Participating Interests (IP/PPI) and Badan Operasi Bersama (BOB). PHE’s overseas working areas covered: Western Desert Block 3, Iraq; Block 10 & 11.1, Offshore South Vietnam; Block SK-305, Offshore Sarawak, Malaysia; Sabratah 17-3 Block, Offshore Libya; Sirte 123-3 Block, Libya; Block 13, Red Sea, Offshore Sudan; Block-3, Offshore Qatar; and Basker Manta Gummy Block, Australia.

- Pertamina Internasional EP

Pertamina Internasional Eksplorasi dan Produksi (PIEP) is established on 18 November 2013, based on the need for international asset management that is focused on overseas assets of PT Pertamina (Persero).

- Pertamina EP Cepu ADK

PT Pertamina EP Cepu ADK hereinafter referred to as PEPC ADK was established on 15 August 2013 in order to manage Fields of Alas Dara and Kemuning (ADK). Following the prevailing rules and legislation in the Ministry of Energy and Mineral Resources, the PSC between SKKMigas and PEPC ADK was signed on 26 February 2014. PEPC ADK is the operator of Alas Dara and Kemuning, located in Blora, Central Java, which was previously operated by Mobil Cepu Ltd. (MCL). In line with the commitment to the Government, PEPC ADK shall conduct Well Re-entry, Perform G&G Study, GGR Study, and exploration drilling. Since established, the PEPC ADK has never changed its name.

- ConocoPhillips Algeria Ltd

ConocoPhillips Algeria Ltd. owns three onshore oil fields. The company is based in Algeria. As of 27 November 2013, ConocoPhillips Algeria Ltd. operates as a subsidiary of PT Pertamina (Persero).

- Pertamina Gas Negara
- Pertamina Power Indonesia
- Pertamina Patra Niaga

Holding company for Pertamina's downstream operations.

- Kilang Pertamina Internasional
- Pertamina Trans Kontinental
- Pertamina Retail
- Pertamina Lubricants
- Pertamina Internasional Shipping
- Pertamina Training & Consulting
- Patra Jasa
- Pertamina Bina Medika IHC

Holding company for state-owned hospitals; Pertamina owns 51%, minority shareholders include the Indonesia Investment Authority and Swire.

- Pelita Air Service
- Pertamina Pedeve Indonesia

Owns minority stock in Pertamina subsidiaries to satisfy "two-shareholder minimum" required by the Indonesian Limited Companies Act.

- Elnusa, Tbk.
- Pertamina Internasional Timor S.A.
- Pertamina Hulu Indonesia
- Pertamina East Natuna
- Pertamina Energy Trading Limited
- Pertamina E&P Libya
- Tugu Pratama Indonesia
- Pratama Mitra Sejati

== Products ==
There are various PERTAMINA products consisting of fuel (BBM), non-fuel, gas, petrochemical products, and lubricants.

Fuel (BBM)

Fuel Products:

- Kerosene
- HSD (High-Speed Diesel)
- MDF (Marine Diesel Fuel)
- MFO (Marine Fuel Oil)
- Motor Gasoline (e.g. Premium 88 and Solar)

Special Fuel

Special Fuel products:

- Aviation Gasoline
- Aviation Turbine Fuel
- Pertalite (RON 90)
- Pertamax (RON 92)
- Pertamax Green (RON 95, Ethanol 5% (E5))
- Pertamax Turbo (RON 98)
- Pertamax Racing (RON 100)
- Solar/Bio Solar (CN 48, Sulfur 3.500 ppm)
- Dexlite (CN 51, Sulfur 1.200 ppm)
- Pertamina Dex (CN 53, Sulfur 300 ppm)

Non-Fuel (Non-BBM)

Non Fuel Products:

- Asphalt
- Calcined Coke
- Green Coke
- Heavy Aromate
- Paraffin Wax
- Solvent
- Lube Base Oil
- Slack Wax

Lube Base Oil

Pertamina’s Lube Base Oil Products based on their function:

- Automotive Gear Oil
- Circulating Oils
- Heavy-Duty Diesel Engine Oils
- Industrial and Marine Engine Oils
- Industrial and Hydraulic Oils
- Passenger Car Oils
- Powershift Transmissions and Heavy Equipment Hydraulic Oils
- Refrigerating Oils
- Two-Stroke Gasoline Engine Oils

Gas

Gas products include:

- LPG (Liquefied Petroleum Gas)
- Gas Fuel (BBG)
- Musicool (Substitute refrigerant for CFC, with low pollution and environmentally friendly)

Petrochemical

Petrochemical products include:

- Benzene
- Paraxylene
- Polypropylene
- Pure Terephthalic Acid (PTA)
- Sulfur

== Commercial automotive partnerships ==
Pertamina is an official recommended fuel and lubricants partner for Lamborghini for automobiles since 2015.

== Sports sponsorships ==
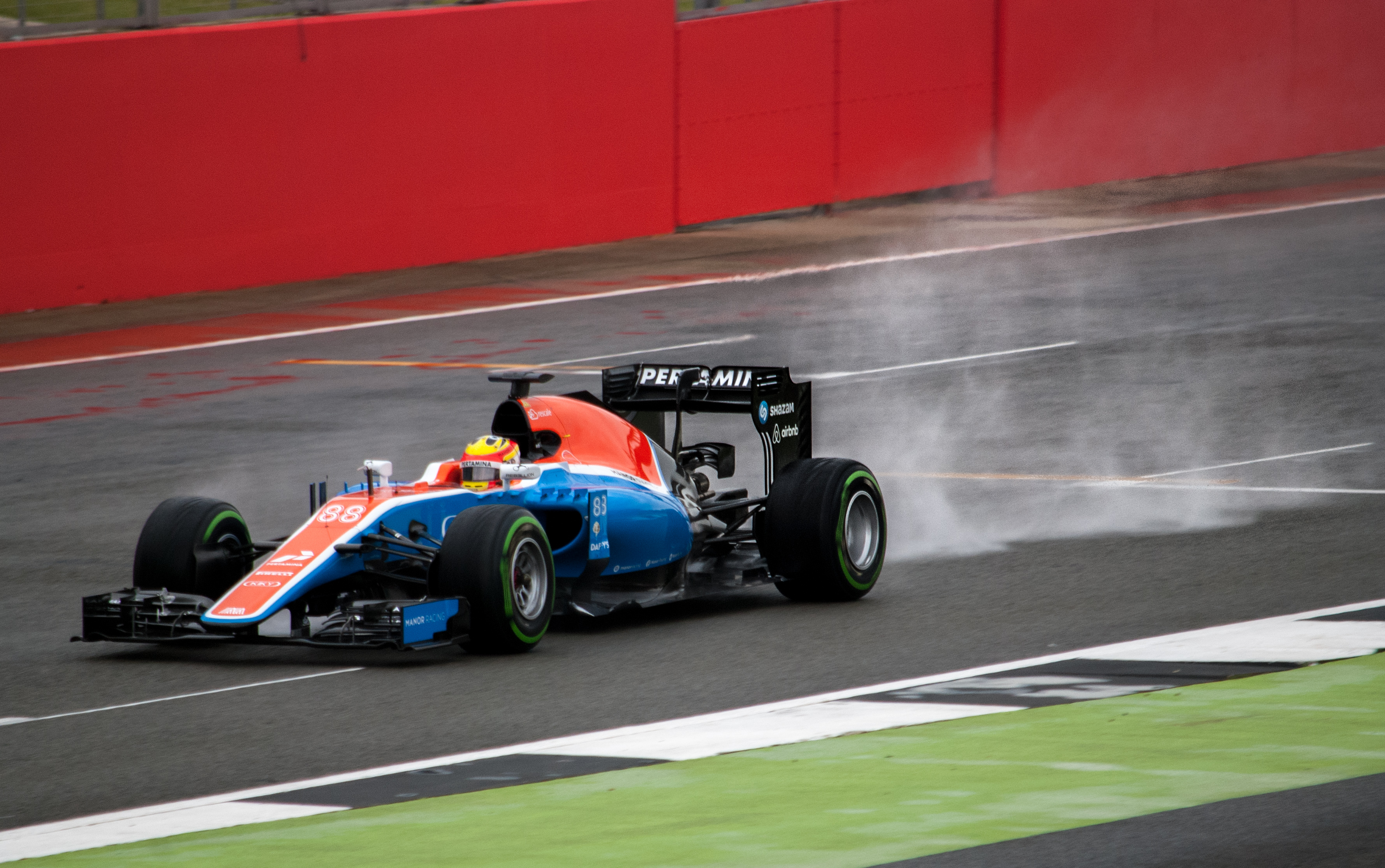
Rio Haryanto in Manor Racing

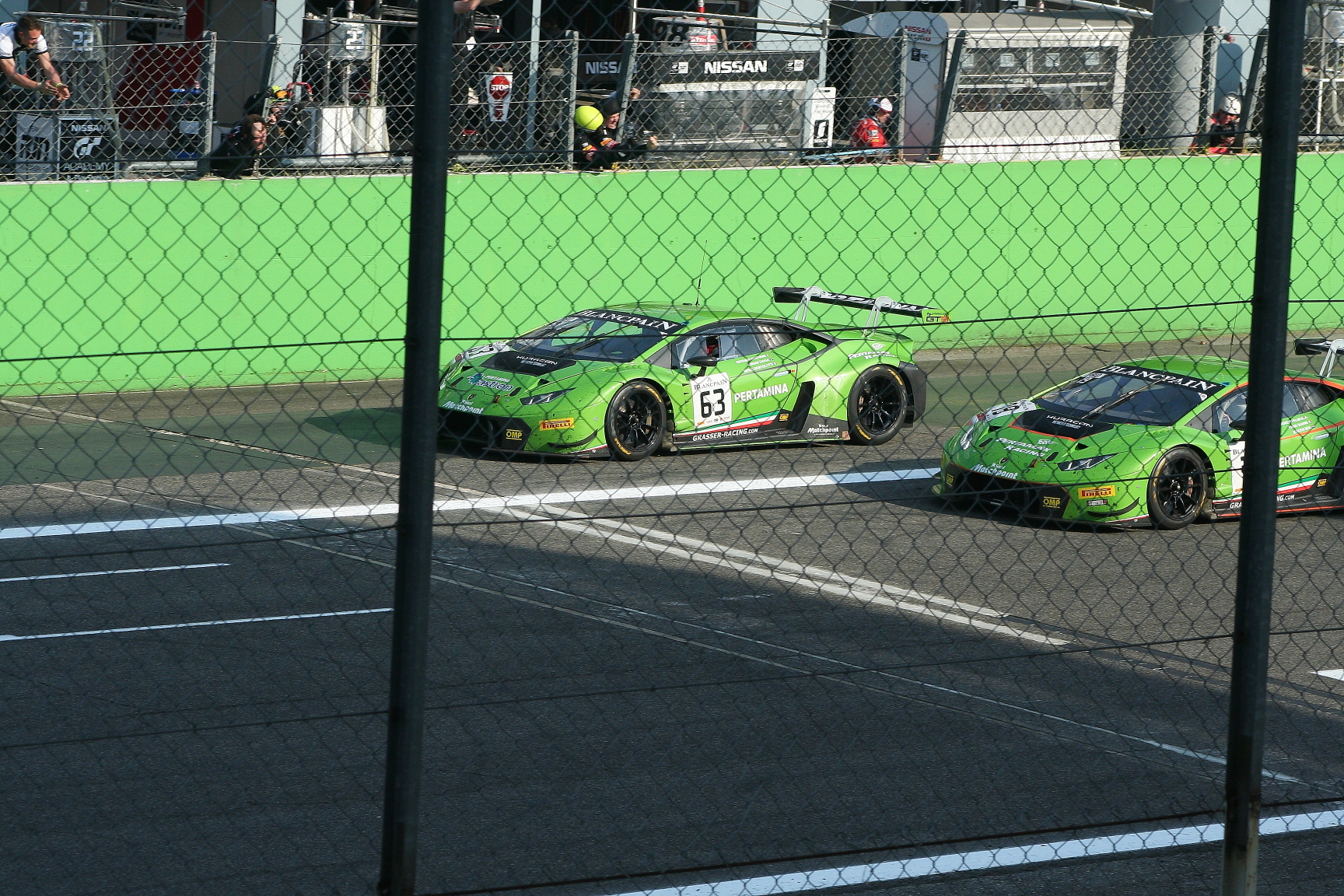
Lamborghini Super Trofeo

From 2005 until 2007 Pertamina became the main sponsor for Doni Tata Pradita in Yamaha Team who raced in the MotoGP 125cc and 250cc class wildcard entry in Malaysian motorcycle Grand Prix. The partnership was extended to full 2008 season, with Pradita scored a single point in China.

Then starting the 2021 season, Pertamina collaborated with the Mandalika Racing Team and SAG Team to compete both in Moto2 World Championship and the CEV Moto2 Championship.

Rio Haryanto, Indonesia's first Formula One driver, was sponsored by Pertamina throughout his junior career and played a role in securing his drive with the Manor Racing team in 2016. However, Pertamina ended their sponsorship with Manor halfway through the season as Haryanto was demoted to reserve driver due to lack of funding.

Since 2016 Pertamina has also supported Indonesian driver Sean Gelael, with its brandings prominently featured in his race cars ever since.

Pertamina also sponsored the Italian automotive manufacturer Lamborghini since 2015 as an official global lubricant partner, which also extended to Lamborghini Super Trofeo as title sponsor.

Pertamina is the main sponsor for Mandalika International Street Circuit and Indonesian motorcycle Grand Prix, as well as the VR46 Racing Team

== See also ==
- Bataafse Petroleum Maatschappij
- Shell plc
- MyPertamina
