= Madura State Polytechnic =

University in Indonesia

- Politeknik Negeri Madura
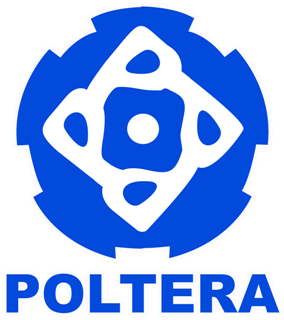
- the Seal of "POLTERA" (Indonesia)
- Motto: Quod Lux Clarior Futura
- Motto in English: The Light of Brighter Future
- Type: Polytechnic College; Public University; State University; Educational institution Research institution
- Academic affiliations: ✓ UNIPOLTECH association ✓ PMDK Politeknik Negeri; ✓ Kemenristekdikti Indonesia
- President: Dr. Arman Jaya
- Focused on: Maritime transport Marine Technology; Occupational safety and health
- Location: Taddan Highway, Camplong, Sampang, East Java, Indonesia; 7.215594°S 113.272442°E
- Campus: Rural
- Established: 29 October 2012 as a polytechnic college of Madura
- Inaugurated: 11 November 2012 as a Madura State Polytechnic
- Colors: Red heart
- Nicknames: Blue Gears; Pride of Engineer
- Executive board: The BEM of Poltera; POLTERA TV
- Activity units: UKM of Nature lover; UKM of Martial arts; UKM of Badminton; etc.
- Website: http://www.poltera.ac.id
- Poltera's Video Profile

Academic administration
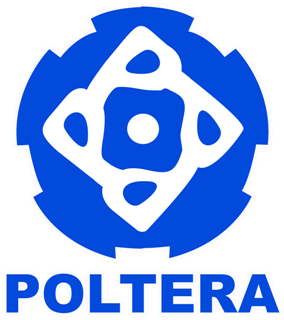
- The President of Polytechnic College; Ministry of Research, Technology and Higher Education
- Incumbent; Dr. Arman Jaya since 2017
- Term length: 4 years
- Inaugural holder: Ir. Achmad Ansori, DEA
- Formation: 2012

The Madura State Polytechnic was known in abbreviation as POLTERA, and formerly founded by Bina Sampang Mandiri (BSM) foundation in Madura island of Indonesia. The campus purposes to aim for the first Applied Technology model-based polytechnic college which is not similarly with Engineering model-based University. Since it was inaugurated as a state university as one of the well-known several polytechnics in East Java, which located in Sampang. Then previously founded in the year of 2012, the polytechnic is under the auspices of Ministry of Education (Kemendikbud). In the year of 2014, the auspices was replaced to the Ministry of Research, Technology and Higher Education (Kemenristekdikti). Poltera is not only educational role-model of engineering science in which was focussing towards maritime transport and marine technology as a kick-starter, but is also adopts model of industry-oriented education in tomorrow's engineer for the future of polytechnic (POLTECH).

Since 2012, Poltera was the first vocational education system in Madura. So, Poltera is located in Camplong by UTC+07:00 or West Indonesia Time (WIB), province of East Java, which institution is equivalent to the university, especially the Institute of Technology. Poltera has been officially established to organizes academic and non-academic activities, as the initial pioneer with the coordination of two well-known institutions from Surabaya, such as the Electronic Engineering Polytechnic Institute of Surabaya (EEPIS) and the Shipbuilding Institute of Polytechnic Surabaya (SHIPS) as the temporary foundation for the readiness, towards establishment of an independent polytechnic college. For the constructions, lectures, academics and its facilities, in which explanation based on interview of first Director, Ir. Achmad Ansori, DEA. that in mid-2016, Poltera plans to utilize existing building facilities for lectures program of the only applied courses in Madura and as the flagship campus in Indonesia, especially Madura. Since establishment, the Union of polytechnic (UNIPOLTECH) is an association of state polytechnic colleges in Indonesia (automatically), and Plotter Dies Natalis of birthday celebrations in which officially commemorated every 11 November by interval (born in 2012) of several achievement on progress.

== History ==
=== The Madura State Polytechnic Establishment in 2012 ===
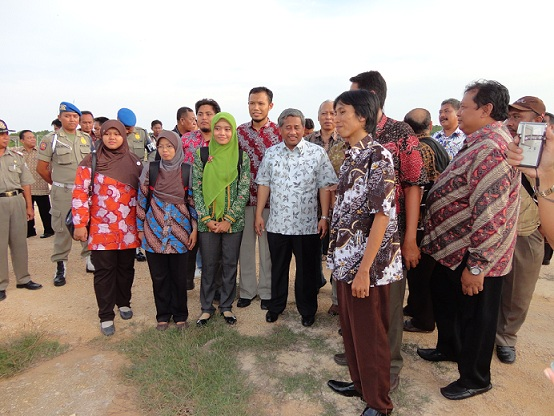
The Visitation of Minister of Education and Culture

The Polytechnic of Madura in establishment, the process was initially initiated by Yayasan Bina Sampang Mandiri (BSM), which was chaired by Ir. Mohammad Syaifurrahman Noer, he is more familiarly known by the nickname Cipung, son of H. Mohammad Noer, former Governor of East Java. It was greeted enthusiastically by the Regent of Sampang at that time. Furthermore, BSM Foundation in cooperation with the government of Sampang Regency realized the idea, and agreed to name the Polytechnic of Madura the so-called Poltera. The Ministry of Education and Culture (Mendikbud) Indonesia, Prof. Dr. Ir. H. Muhammad Nuh, DEA. (In the tenure of 22 October 2009 – 20 October 2014) has given a tremendous appreciation of the request for the establishment of the Madurese Polytechnic. During his visit to the location of the Madura Polytechnic campus on 12 May 2012, he said that the Madurese Polytechnic will directly become the State Polytechnic, said Mendikbud Indonesia at that time period which is the alma mater of the Sepuluh Nopember Institute of Technology also known as Institut Teknologi Sepuluh Nopember (ITS) in Surabaya, became the basic evidence of the seriousness of Kemendikbud of Indonesia in developing State Polytechnic in Madura. The establishment of Poltera aims to meet the needs of qualified human resources (Smart, Excellence, Dignity) for the industrial sector in which the graduates are prepared to become actors in development.

The institutional status is clear with the presence of Permendikbud 67/2012 which states that Poltera is a state polytechnic, while funding support ranges from seventy-five billion rupiahs to one-hundred billion rupiahs, which is gradually disbursed.

— Prof. Muhammad Nuh

In accordance with the Presidential Regulation no. 10 Year 2016, Poltera is one of 35 colleges that have been established to become new public institutions. Most of these new state universities originally came from private universities. Poltera was established in 2012 on the initiative of BSM Foundation, and subsequently through Minister of Education Decree No. 67 of 2012 was confirmed to be a college.

=== The movement to a new building and start in 2016 ===
In the beginning of academic year of 2012/13, Poltera has three majors of study program: Industrial Electrical Technology, Heavy Industry Technology, and Shipbuilding Technology. Total students amounted to 251 people, supported by 19 lecturers, and 13 staff formations of academic administration. Building facility that can be used for lecturing activities is a lecture building of Industrial Electrical Technology which consisting of three floors, and one building workshop of Building Engineering Department of Ship. However, Inspectorate II Team, inspector general of Kemenristekdikti RI, is assisted by Internal Supervisory Unit (SPI), M. Ishak, and Dr. Ir. I Made Gede Arimbawa, found that the facilities available still require improvement and refinement. Some notes from the review activities of the work payable in Poltera in 2016 dated 28 March – 1 April, among others, building hygiene, testing mechanical engineering facilities, safety equipment testing, roof leaks, roof work, still need to be done before delivery to the Poltera. The lecture facility of the Mechanical Engineering Department was still in the completion stage of three floors. At the end of 2016, Poltera plans to finish building completion of workshop, until now the construction of Poltera building is still ongoing as the improvement of facilities and infrastructure of advanced science education which is advanced and updated in technological development.

After merger in the academic year of 2018/2019, Poltera has four majors of study program by addition of Nursing Academy.

=== The Merger of Nursing Academy Pamekasan in 2018 ===
Nursing academy of the Pamekasan district government was merged with Poltera, that is because a number of State Universities have merged with the campus owned by the Regional Government. This was done by the regional government under the pretext of Law 23 of 2014.

== Study Program ==
=== Diplôme of Strata-0 Degree ===
Applied associate degree is expected to be a professional or energy-driven industrial-scale independent, applicative, and innovative. Polaris Diploma Program has been established since the establishment of Poltera, some of the study programs have been accredited and some are still in process.

Student admission of Polytechnic College of Madura by interest tracker and aptitude test throughout Indonesia
Term of degree	Academic degree	Program of study	Accreditation status	Capacity
Diploma in associate degree (Vocations)	Associate of Applied Technology (title: A.Md.)			
Diploma in associate degree (Vocations)	Associate of Applied Technology (title: A.Md.)	Associate Industrial Electrical Technology	Accredited	30
Diploma in associate degree (Vocations)	Associate of Applied Technology (title: A.Md.)	Associate Heavy Industry Technology	Accredited	31
Diploma in associate degree (Vocations)	Associate of Applied Technology (title: A.Md.)	Associate Shipbuilding Technology	Accredited	31
Diploma in associate degree (Vocations)	Associate of Applied Technology (title: A.Md.)	Associate Nursing Academy	Accredited	100
Total				192

=== Baccalauréat of Strata-1 Degree ===
Applied bachelor's degree is expected to be a leader in the field or industrial scale developers who are able to solve technical problems with certain methods and realize more efficient, effective, and advanced performance levels.

== Identity ==
The Poltera symbol is in the shape of a dark blue tooth, five teeth, and in it are four white "P" letters that are interconnected to form a rhombus, in the middle there is a small white circle and the bottom of the gear is dark blue of "POLTERA" written symmetrical about the gears. The meaning of the symbol that the gear with the number of five teeth has a strong and dynamic meaning and brings the soul of Pancasila; four P letters that are interconnected means that the island of Madura which has a strong character, unites in independence, and determination to continue developing for the nation and state; and the four basic pillars connected to each other, namely the spirit of independence; human resources which include lecturers, students, and education personnel who have quality character and mindset; extensive network with business and industry at home and abroad; and good governance and encourage positive spirit. White circle means Poltera as the center of science and technology development. The writing "POLTERA" comes from the Madurese language which consists of the word "POL" has full meaning; and "TERA" has a light meaning; blue is a spectrum of calm, firm colors, and describes the extent of the sky and ocean; and the white color of the symbol means noble character and pure intentions towards the effort to achieve mutual glory.

THE DIVERSITY COLORS OF MADURA STATE POLYTECHNIC
Name	Competence	Flag
State Polytechnic College of Madura	Being a Polytechnic of Excellence, Intelligence, and Dignity.	The institution Flag of Madura State Polytechnic " Acronym: Poltera "
Study program of Shipbuilding Technology	1. Vocational education is applied to this course, so in addition to face-to-face lecture theory, there is also a face-to-face lecture practice or practicum.; 2. Current curriculum, referring to the industry's competency-based curriculum.; 3. Expected with industry-based curriculum then the existing graduates can be absorbed entirely by the industry with appropriate competence.	Department Flag of Shipbuilding Technology " Acronym: TBK "
Study program of Industrial Electrical Technology	1. Produce junior technician (A.Md.) in the field of industrial installation supported by generation, system design, system improvement, English, ethics, and entrepreneurship.; 2. Produce research and dedication and service to the public in the field of electricity. generate acceptance and benefit for the Diploma program of three industrial electrical techniques through cooperation with various parties in a sustainable manner in the field of education, research and service and community service.	Department Flag of Industrial Electrical Technology " Acronym: TLI "
Study program of Heavy Equipment Engine Technology	1. To organize vocational education in the field of planning, design and machine machine technology.; 2. To produce graduates who are faithful and devoted to the omnipotent God, responsive to the changes and progress of the times and professional graduates in the field of planning, design and technology of machine tools.; 3. Develop and nurture the life of the academic community in heavy machine engineering courses through professional management of higher education management work program.; 4. Building cooperation with industry in the education process through the provision of subjects related to machine machine technology, practical subjects related to machine machine technology, field work practice, industry apprenticeship for lecturers, planning and development of curriculum and sap and holding lectures general.provide services to the public in the field of planning, design, and maintenance of machine tools for the needy.	Department Flag of Heavy Equipment Engine Technology " Acronym: TMAB "

== President of Madura State Polytechnic ==
Below is a list of the Director of the State Polytechnic of Madura as a track record of the history of Poltera, especially from its inception to the next in sustained leadership.

THE LIST OF PRESIDENT OF MADURA STATE POLYTECHNIC
No.	Photo	President	First	Last	Information
1.		Ir. Achmad Ansori, DEA	2012	2017	One of the founders since the building was in the stage of the development process which was then inaugurated on 10 October 2016
2.		Ir. Achmad Ansori, DEA	2017	~~2021~~	Officially he formerly was appointed by Kemenristekdikti on 17 May 2017 and he died on 25 August 2017 after 101 days officiate
3.		Dr. Arman Jaya	2017	2018	Deputy-1 was inaugurated rises to replace temporary as the director until the 1st director in term of acclamation, then another decision by senate for re-election
4.		Dr. Arman Jaya	2018	2022	Elected based on the results of closed Senate Meeting on 19 December 2018 with 9 votes and appointed by Kemenristekdikti on 20 December 2018
