= SMA Negeri 8 Jakarta =

- Logo SMAN 8 Jakarta

Location
- Jalan Taman Bukitduri; South Jakarta, Jakarta 12840; Indonesia

Information
- Type: Public school
- Established: August 1, 1958
- Status: Rintisan Sekolah Bertaraf Internasional
- Principal: Rita Hastuti
- Grades: 10-12
- Enrollment: 1200
- Campus type: Urban
- Accreditation: A
- Yearbook: Gema Cinta Smandel
- Magazine: Takitri
- Website: www.sman8jkt.sch.id

SMA Negeri 8 Jakarta (also known as SMANDEL) is a selective, coeducational public high school in Jakarta, Indonesia. It is located on Jalan Taman Bukitduri, South Jakarta. The school is distinguished by Ministry of Education as Rintisan Sekolah Bertaraf Internasional (RSBI), or pioneering international school, and one of designated Excellent Schools in the province of Jakarta. The school is colloquially referred to as Delapan (Indonesian: Eight) by Jakartans.

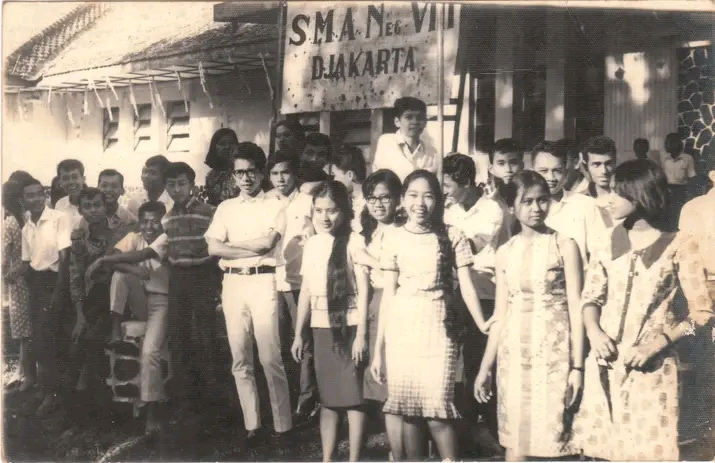
Condition and situation at SMA Negeri 8 Jakarta in 1960s

SMA Negeri 8 Jakarta is known for its selective admission process, achievements in science competitions such as the National Science Olympiad, and an excellent performance of its students in the Indonesian university entrance examination known as SNMPTN. The school has been ranked as one of the best high schools in the country for multiple times.

== History ==
SMA Negeri 8 Jakarta opened its doors on August 1, 1958. At that time, the school was located at Taman Slamet Rijadi. The present school building in Bukitduri was opened by Governor Ali Sadikin on March 30, 1971.

In 2004, the school became the resource center for the studies of physics and astronomy in Jakarta. Also in 2008, SMA Negeri 8 Jakarta started an international program in cooperation with Cambridge University.

== Partnerships ==
As a pioneering international school, the school has established relationships with schools abroad. Sister schools are located in Singapore, Thailand, Australia, and Turkey. Some foreign universities have also established partnerships with the school, and they visit SMA Negeri 8 Jakarta and organize information sessions.

SMA Negeri 8 Jakarta has graduates attending Indonesian universities, and each year there is a homecoming tradition for those alumni. They talk before the entire senior class to promote their colleges and help prospective university students prepare themselves for the admission process.

The school is one of the model schools in Indonesia. Other schools refer to its academic and organizational systems, and annually SMA Negeri 8 Jakarta receives tens of official visits from other schools, both domestic and international. In academic year 2009/2010, the school received 45 official visits. Faculty members and the members of central student government of the school visit schools as a part of comparative study. Some faculty members have been invited to officially visit schools in other parts of Southeast Asia as well as Australia.

The school offers homestay and cultural immersion opportunities for its students. Students travel to the United States, United Kingdom, or Australia with teachers as chaperons. Under the partnership with Singaporean and Japanese universities, it is possible for teachers and student alike to attend workshops and summer camps abroad. Students are selected each year to participate in exchange programs, where they study in foreign high schools and stay with local families. Students of the school have been sent to the United States, Switzerland, Belgium, Italy, France, and Norway to name a few.

SMA Negeri 8 Jakarta has a tradition of traditional performing arts, such as saman. Student performers have been invited to perform in Indonesia and overseas.

== Notable alumni ==
- Vena Annisa, broadcaster and VOA presenter
- Mesty Ariotedjo, medical doctor, harpist, model, socialite
- Meutya Hafid, Journalist and minister of Communications and Digitals
- Nicholas Saputra, actor, class of 2002
- Siti Nurbaya Bakar, former minister of Environment and Forestry
- Juliari Batubara, former minister of social affairs
- Kaneishia Yusuf, singer and actress
- Annisa Suci Ramadhani, Regent of Dharmasraya (2025 - present)
- Tri Edhi Budhi Soesilo, Indonesian environmental scientist
