= Supriatna =

Indonesian geographer (born 1967)

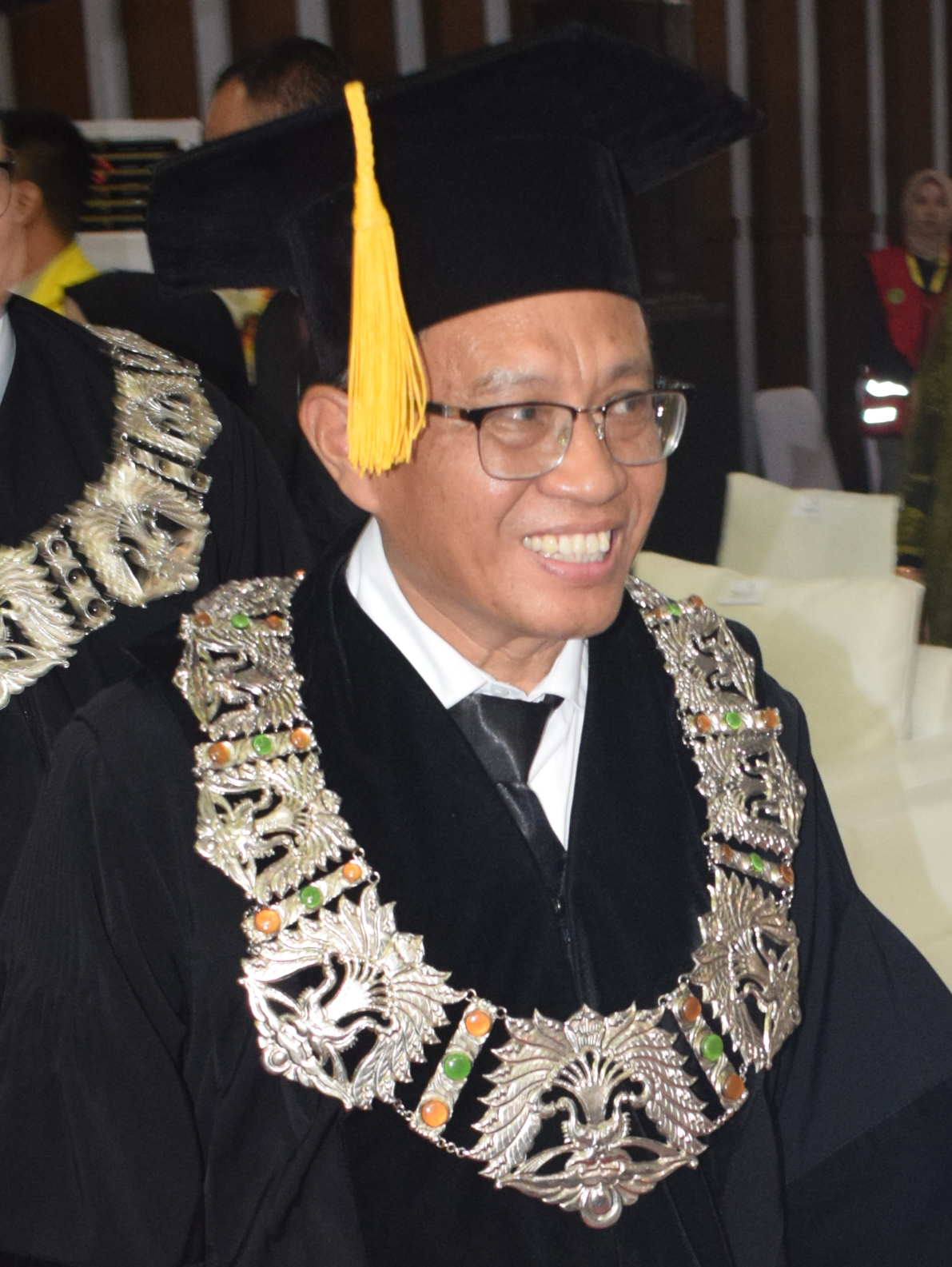

Director of the Graduate School of Sustainable Development
- Incumbent
- Assumed office 22 October 2025
- Preceded by: office established

Director of the University of Indonesia School of Strategic and Global Studies
- Acting
- In office 3 March 2025 – 22 October 2025
- Preceded by: Athor Subroto
- Succeeded by: office abolished

Director of the University of Indonesia School Of Environmental Science
- In office 26 February 2025 – 22 October 2025
- Preceded by: Tri Edhi Budhi Soesilo
- Succeeded by: office abolished

Personal details
- Born: 14 March 1967 (age 59) Sukabumi, West Java, Indonesia
- Education: University of Indonesia (Drs., Dr., Prof.); Bandung Institute of Technology (MT)

Academic background
- Thesis: Sustainable Landscape Model for the Cimandiri Estuary in West Java, Indonesia (2016)
- Doctoral advisor: Jatna Supriatna; Raldi Hendro Koestoer; Noverita Dian Takarina

Academic work
- Discipline: Geography
- Sub-discipline: Geographic information system Remote sensing

Supriatna (born 14 March 1967) is an Indonesian professor of geography and academic administrator at the University of Indonesia. He is currently the Director of the University of Indonesia School of Environmental Science since 26 February 2025, and the acting director of the University of Indonesia School of Strategic and Global Studies since 3 March 2025.

== Early life and education ==
Supriatna was born in Sukabumi on 14 March 1967 as the son of Zaenal Emuch and Yohana Lobo. He completed his primary education at the 1st Cikole State Primary School in Sukabumi in 1981, followed by secondary education at the 2nd Sukabumi Junior High School in 1983 and the 1st Sukabumi State High School in 1986. He then pursued his higher education at the University of Indonesia, graduating with a Bachelor of Science degree in Geography from the Faculty of Mathematics and Natural Sciences in 1992. He continued his studies at the Bandung Institute of Technology, earning a Master of Engineering degree in Geodesy from the Faculty of Earth Sciences and Technology (FTSP) in 1998. In 2016, he obtained a doctorate in Environmental Science from the Postgraduate Program in Environmental Science (PSIL) at the University of Indonesia. He also holds a Professional Geographer certification from the Indonesian Geographers Association (IGI) in 2024.

== Academic career ==
Supriatna began his career as a lecturer in the University of Indonesia Department of Geography, teaching digital cartography and geographic information system. He began his academic career as the department's student affairs coordinator in 1998 before being promoted to the department secretary a year later. On 8 April 2004, Supriatna was appointed as the deputy dean for non-academic affairs of the Faculty of Maths and Natural Sciences under dean Adi Basukriadi, serving in the position until 2014. On 31 July 2012, Supriatna was appointed as the acting dean of the faculty by rector Gumilar Rusliwa Soemantri, citing Adi's expired term as his reasoning. In response to the dismissal, Adi and several other deans who were dismissed filed a letter of complaint to education Minister Mohammad Nuh, explaining their motion of no confidence against Gumilar. Adi and these deans was restored to his position following a meeting between the university's board of trustees and the minister of education in August that year.

After serving as deputy dean for ten years, Supriatna was appointed as the head of the Geosciences Study Center in the faculty, serving from 2014 to 2016. He then returned to structural position at the geography department and became the coordinator of geographic information system and remote sensing specialization (Ketua KBP SIG dan PJ, Ketua Kelompok Bidang Pembelajaran Sistem Informasi Geografis dan Penginderaan Jauh) from 2016 to 2017. After briefly serving as the head of the geography's master studies in 2017, Supriatna became the head of the applied geography center in the faculty on the same year, serving until 2019. The next year, he was appointed as the chair of the geography department. He was re-appointed as center head in 2019 and as department head in 2022. From 2022 to 2024, Supriatna was also involved in the Nusantara transition team, serving as the coordinator for mapping and spatial planning. Supriatna was promoted to the rank of full professor on 1 September 2024. His inaugural speech on 15 January 2025, titled Spatial Modelling for Sustainable Development, discussed the use of various geographic technologies to analyze land cover changes, urbanization dynamics, and ecosystem sustainability, as well as the integration of geography in various disciplines.

Supriatna was named as the Director of the University of Indonesia School of Environmental Science (SIL, Sekolah Ilmu Lingkungan) on 22 January 2025 after passing a series of selection. He was installed for the position on 26 February. On 3 March 2025, Supriatna was named as the acting director of the University of Indonesia School of Strategic and Global Studies (SKSG, Sekolah Kajian Stratejik dan Global), following the removal of the previous director, Athor Subroto, in relation to his involvement in the doctorate promotion of Minister of Energy and Mineral Resources Bahlil Lahadalia. Supriatna was tasked to restructure and improve the internal structure of SKSG, enhance aspects related to human resources, update and refine the learning processes, and ensuring accountability and transparency in the school. As a result of the restructuring, SKSG and SIL were merged to form the Graduate School of Sustainable Development (Sekolah Pascasarjana Pembangunan Berkelanjutan, SPPB) on 22 October 2025, and Supriatna was installed as its director on the same day.

== Association memberships ==
Aside from teaching at the University of Indonesia, Supriatna also taught at the National Development University "Veteran" Jakarta. He is also a member of a number of academic organizations, such as the Indonesian Geographers Association, Indonesian Lecturers Association, Indonesian Geospatial Council, Indonesian Environmental Experts Association, Indonesian Disaster Experts Association, and MIPAnet.

== Personal life ==
Supriatna is married to Vreshty Winda Aryanti and has a son and a daughter. The couple currently resides in Cimanggis, Depok.
