= Rasio Ridho Sani =

Indonesian senior bureaucrat

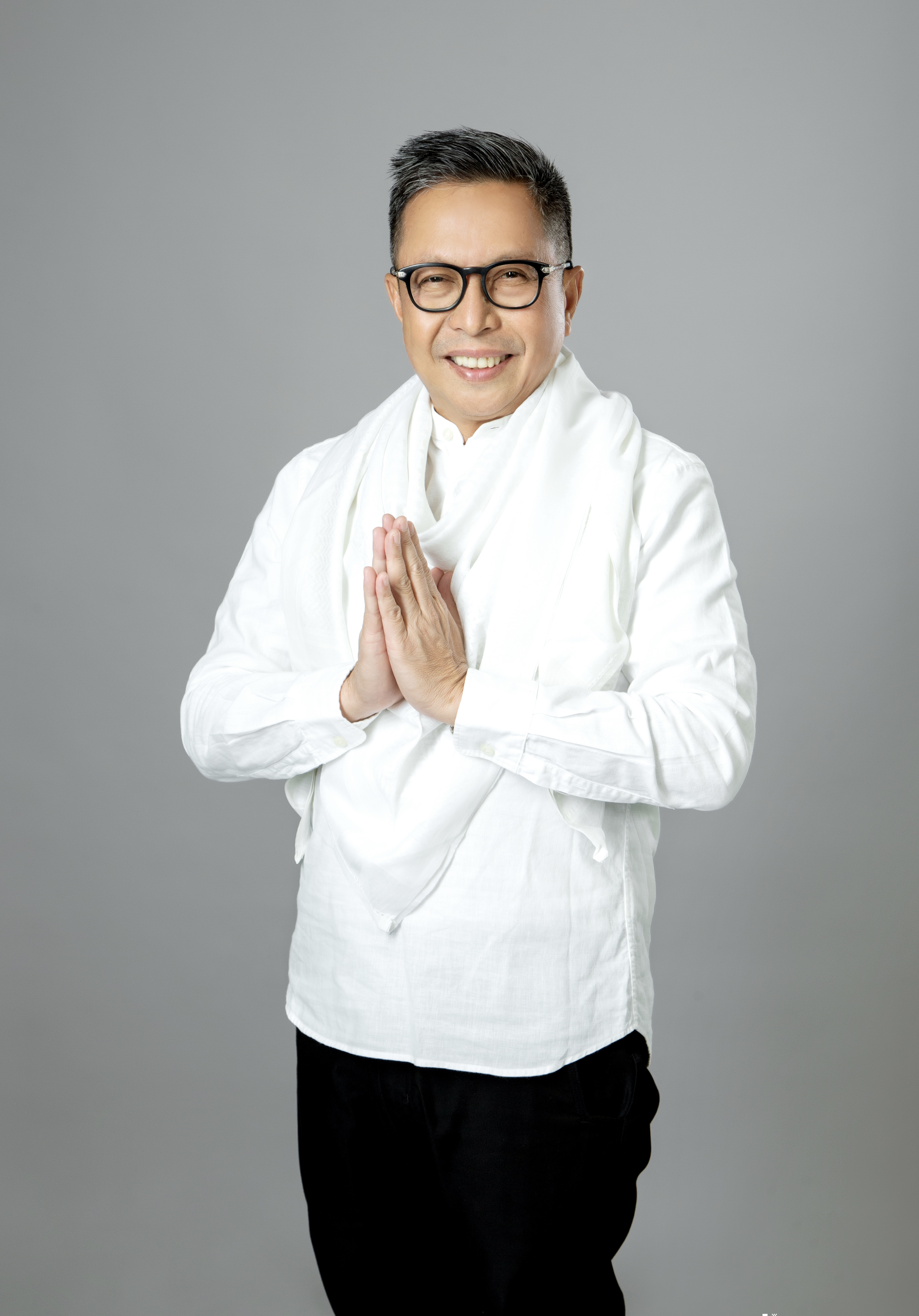

Deputy to the Ministry of Environment for Pollution and Environmental Damage Control
- Incumbent
- Assumed office 6 January 2025
- Minister: Hanif Faisol Nurofiq
- Preceded by: Sigit Reliantoro (acting)

Deputy to the Ministry of Environment for Law Enforcement
- Acting
- In office 21 October 2024 – 6 January 2025
- Minister: Hanif Faisol Nurofiq
- Preceded by: Himself (as Director General of Law Enforcement)
- Succeeded by: Rizal Irawan

Director General of Law Enforcement, Ministry of Forestry and Environment
- In office 29 May 2015 – 21 October 2024
- Minister: Siti Nurbaya Bakar
- Preceded by: office established
- Succeeded by: himself (as Deputy of Law Enforcement)

Secretary to the Ministry of Environment
- In office 26 September 2014 – 29 May 2015
- Minister: Balthasar Kambuaya; Siti Nurbaya Bakar
- Preceded by: Hermien Roosita; M. R. Karliansyah (acting)
- Succeeded by: Bambang Hendroyono (as Secretary General of the Ministry of Forestry and Environment)

Deputy in the Ministry of Environment for Waste, Hazardous Waste, and Toxic Materials Management
- In office 30 July 2013 – 26 September 2014
- Minister: Balthasar Kambuaya
- Preceded by: Masnellyarti Hilman
- Succeeded by: Ilham Malik

Personal details
- Born: 11 July 1966 (age 59) Pangkalpinang, South Sumatra, Indonesia
- Education: University of Indonesia (S.Si., Dr.); University of Sydney (M.Com); University of Potsdam (MPM)

Rasio Ridho Sani (born 11 July 1966) is an Indonesian senior bureaucrat in the Ministry of Environment. Since 2025, he has served as the Deputy for Pollution and Environmental Damage Control. Previously, from 2015 to 2025, he served as the Director General of Law Enforcement in the Ministry of Environment and Forestry, becoming the first official to hold a director general position dedicated to law enforcement functions.

== Education ==
Rasio was born on 11 July 1966 in Pangkalpinang. He attended the Aisyiyah kindergarten in the city where he finished his education there in 1972. He then continued his education to the Muhammadiyah elementary school, but moved to the 21st Pangkalpinang state elementary school in 1977, which he completed in 1979. He finished advanced education at the 1st Pangkalpinang State Middle School in 1982 and at the 1st Pangkalpinang State High school in 1985.

Upon graduating from high school, Rasio studied chemistry at the University of Indonesia. During his university years, Sani was actively involved in student organizations, serving as the chairman of his major's student association (1987-1988), secretary general of the faculty's student representative body (1988-1989), and secretary general of the Indonesian Chemistry Student Associations Alliance from 1990 to 1991. He graduated with a Bachelor of Sciences in 1991. He later became the secretary general of the faculty's alumni association from 2008 to 2012.

In 1997, Rasio received the Australian Development Scholarship from the Australian government for his master's studies in finance and economics at the University of Sydney. He graduated with a master of commerce degree in 1999. Two years later, Rasio received another scholarship for a second master's degree from the New Zealand Overseas Development Assistance (NZODA) and the Deutsche Stiftung fur Internationale Entwicklung (DSE) in 2001. He pursued master studies in public management from the University of Potsdam, where he was selected as a student representative in his major's board of directors, and graduated in 2002. On 12 January 2017, he received his doctorate in public relations from the University of Indonesia, with a thesis titled A Model of Multi-Layered Collaborative Governance for the Management and Restoration of the Ciliwung Watershed Ecosystems. His advisors were Eko Prasojo and Andreo Wahyudi Atmoko.

== Career ==
Rasio Ridho Sani's career in environmental management began in 1991 as a technical staff in the Deputy for Pollution Control at the Environmental Impact Management Agency. From 1993 to 1994, he was the technical coordinator for small scale industrial pollution control program in the agency. He then served as co-coordinator for the Proper Prokasih program, a program aimed at assesing the role of companies in maintaining clean river, from 1994 to 1996, and subsequently as coordinator for law enforcement program by the agency from 1996 to 1997. In 1997, he undertook an internship at the US-EPA Region IX Office in San Francisco, USA. From 2000 to 2001, he was the acting head of the sub-directorate for mobile source air pollution control agency.

From 2002 to 2004, Sani served as the executive secretary for the Proper program at the Ministry of Environment. He briefly served as the acting assistant deputy for data and information in the ministry from 2004 to 2005 before resuming his prior role until 2010. During his second term as executive secretary, he also served as the acting assistant deputy for mining, energy, oil and gas affairs, serving under the deputy of toxic waste management. During his tenure as executive secretary, Sani was entrusted in a number of roles in international conference. He was the National Coordinator for Media at the COP 13 UNFCC Climate Change Ministerial Conference in Bali in December 2007 and chairman of the Implementation Committee for the Basel Convention COP 9 UNEP Ministerial Conference in Bali in 2008.

From 2010 to 2013, Sani was the ministry's chief of planning and foreign cooperation. During his tenure, he chaired the executive committee of the UN High-Level Dialogue in Solo in July 2011, the Children and Youth Conference for Sustainable Development (TUNZA-UNEP) in Bandung in September 2011, and the UNEP Ministerial Conference for Ozone Layer Protection in Bali in November 2011. He chaired a number of international organizations, including as a member of the executive board for the Strategic Approach to International Chemicals Management representing Asia Pacific from 2012 to 2015.

=== Senior position ===
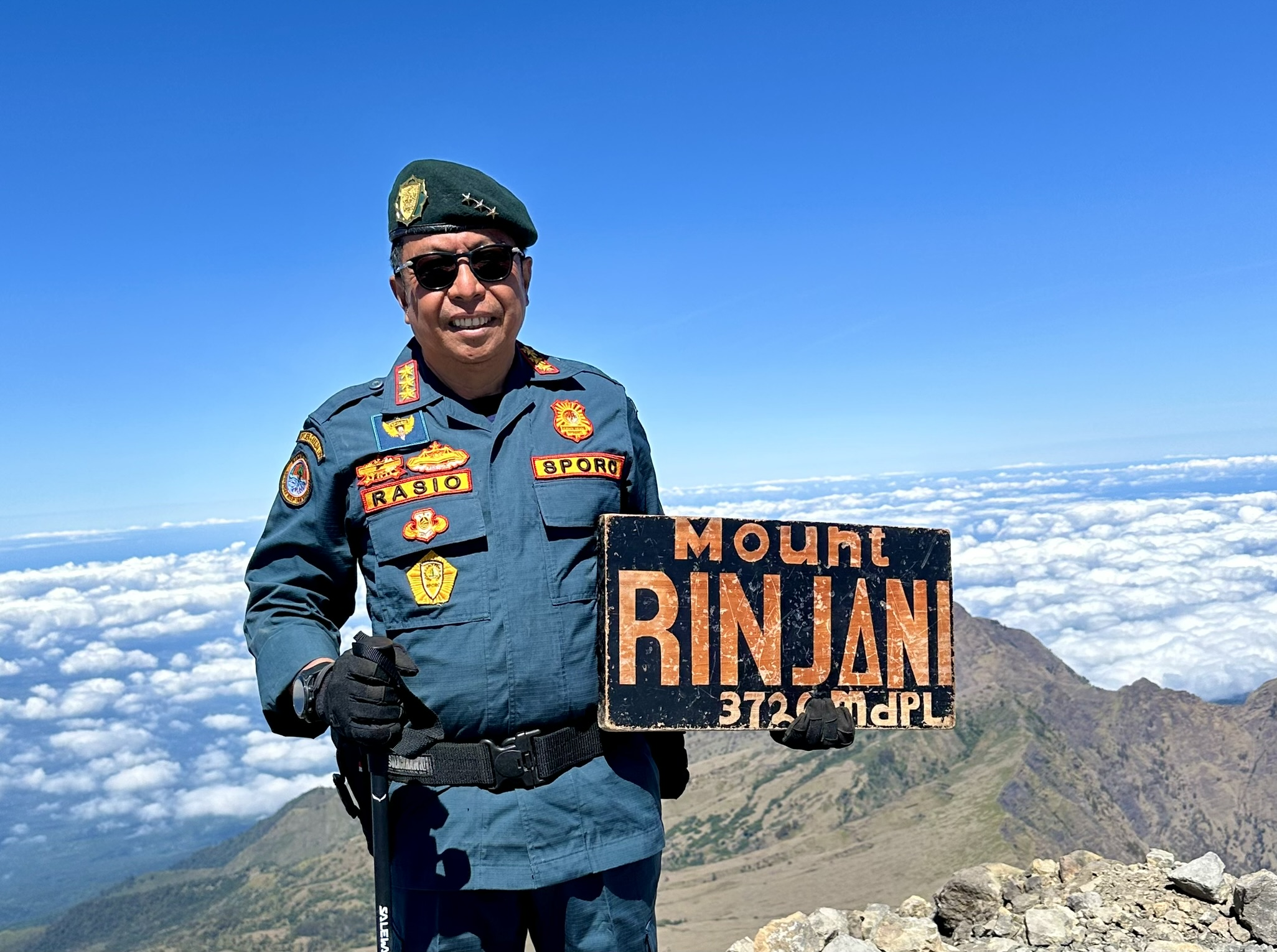
Rasio Ridho Sani at Mount Rinjani with his forest police uniform in 2024.

After serving as bureau chief for three years, on 30 July 2013 Rasio was promoted to a senior position in the ministry as the Deputy in the Ministry of Environment for Waste, Hazardous Waste, and Toxic Materials Management, replacing the retiring Masnellyarti Hilman. As deputy, Rasio oversaw the decentralization of authority for issuing permits to dispose of hazardous and toxic waste.

On 26 September 2014, Rasio was installed as the secretary to the minister for environmental affairs, the most senior bureaucratic position in the ministry, replacing Hermien Roosita who had retired in April that year. Less than a month after his appointment, the ministry of environment was merged with the ministry of forestry to form the ministry of forestry and environment. Rasio was offered by the new minister, Siti Nurbaya Bakar, between retaining his old role or serving in the newly established role of the ministry's director general of law enforcement. Rasio choose to serve in the new role, and he was installed for the post on 29 May 2015. During his brief tenure as secretary, Rasio oversaw the launching of an online service platform for public environmental services, which integrates 23 types of services.

As the director general, Rasio developed the institutional model of the directorate general, which was the first of its kind. The model was replicated by the Ministry of Energy and Mineral Resources in the development of the ministry's own law enforcement agency. The directorate general under him received an award from the police for its cooperation in law enforcement in 2018 and 2019. Rasio himself, in 2019, received the Environmental Enforcement Award for its use of digital tools, cyber patrols on social media and e-commerce, and geospatial tech for tracking environmental crimes, efforts in identifying and addressing internal corruption, and for promoting women into leadership roles and institutionalizing gender-friendly policies. He received the same award in 2020, with this time jointly with the national police, for cross-border efforts in tackling environmental crimes.

In October 2015, Rasio was involved in a dispute that almost turned physical between him and member of Indonesia’s House of Representatives Adian Napitupulu. When questioned about the ministry's role in resolving environment issues, Rasio stated directly his disliking of Adian, sparking a feud between the two. Adian then announced his plans to file a formal complaint against Rasio.

Rasio was named as one of the nominees for the acting governor of Bangka Belitung between 2021 and 2022. In the 2024 Indonesian local elections, Rasio announced his intentions to run for the mayor of Pangkalpinang. Although he applied to several parties for recommendation, he cancelled his intentions. He had previously announced his candidacy for the same position in 2013.

Following the establishment of the environment ministry, Rasio retained his role, albeit in a new nomenclature as the deputy for law enforcement. During his brief acting tenure, Rasio ordered the closure of landfills in Bekasi and Depok. On 6 January 2025, Rasio was appointed as the deputy for pollution and environmental damage control.

== Medal ==
In recognition of his service, Rasio received a number of medal, including:

- Civil Servants' Long Service Medal, 3rd Class (Indonesian: Satyalancana Karya Satya X Tahun) (2003)
- Civil Servants' Long Service Medal, 2nd Class (Indonesian: Satyalancana Karya Satya XX Tahun) (2012)
- Role Model Medal (Indonesian: Satyalancana Wirakarya) (2021)
- Civil Servants' Long Service Medal, 1st Class (Indonesian: Satyalancana Karya Satya XXX Tahun) (2022)
