= Poltera =

Poltera is a surname. Notable people with the surname include:

- Celest Poltera (active late 1980s), Swiss bobsledder
- Gebhard Poltera (1923–2008), Swiss ice hockey player
- Ulrich Poltera (1922–1994), Swiss ice hockey player

== See also ==
- Madura State Polytechnic, aka POLTERA
