= Mesty Ariotedjo =

Medical doctor

- Born: Dwi Lestari Pramesti; 25 April 1989 (age 37); Jakarta, Indonesia
- Education: University of Indonesia
- Occupation: Pediatrician
- Years active: 2007–present

Dwi Lestari Pramesti Ariotedjo (born 25 April 1989), also known as Mesty Ariotedjo, is the CEO at Tentang Anak, a parenting products brand in Indonesia. Pramesti is also a pediatrician and public health practitioner. She started building Tentang Anak while taking maternity leave during COVID-19.

Mesty Ariotedjo is the youngest member of World Economic Forum 2014 from Indonesia. She is also a member of Global Shapers Jakarta.

== Early life ==
Mesty Ariotedjo was born in Jakarta. Her father, Arie Ariotedjo, works as a business executive in a various companies. Her mother, Arti Ariotedjo (née Prawirakusumah), is a socialite and a housewife. Her grandfather, Sri Bima Ariotedjo, was the Indonesian Ambassador to the Philippines.

Ariotedjo was raised as a Muslim. She has Javanese ancestry from her father and Sundanese from her mother. Ariotedjo graduated from SMA Negeri 8 Jakarta in 2007. In 2012, she graduated from Faculty of Medicine, University of Indonesia.
