= Tifatul Sembiring =

Indonesian politician (born 1961)

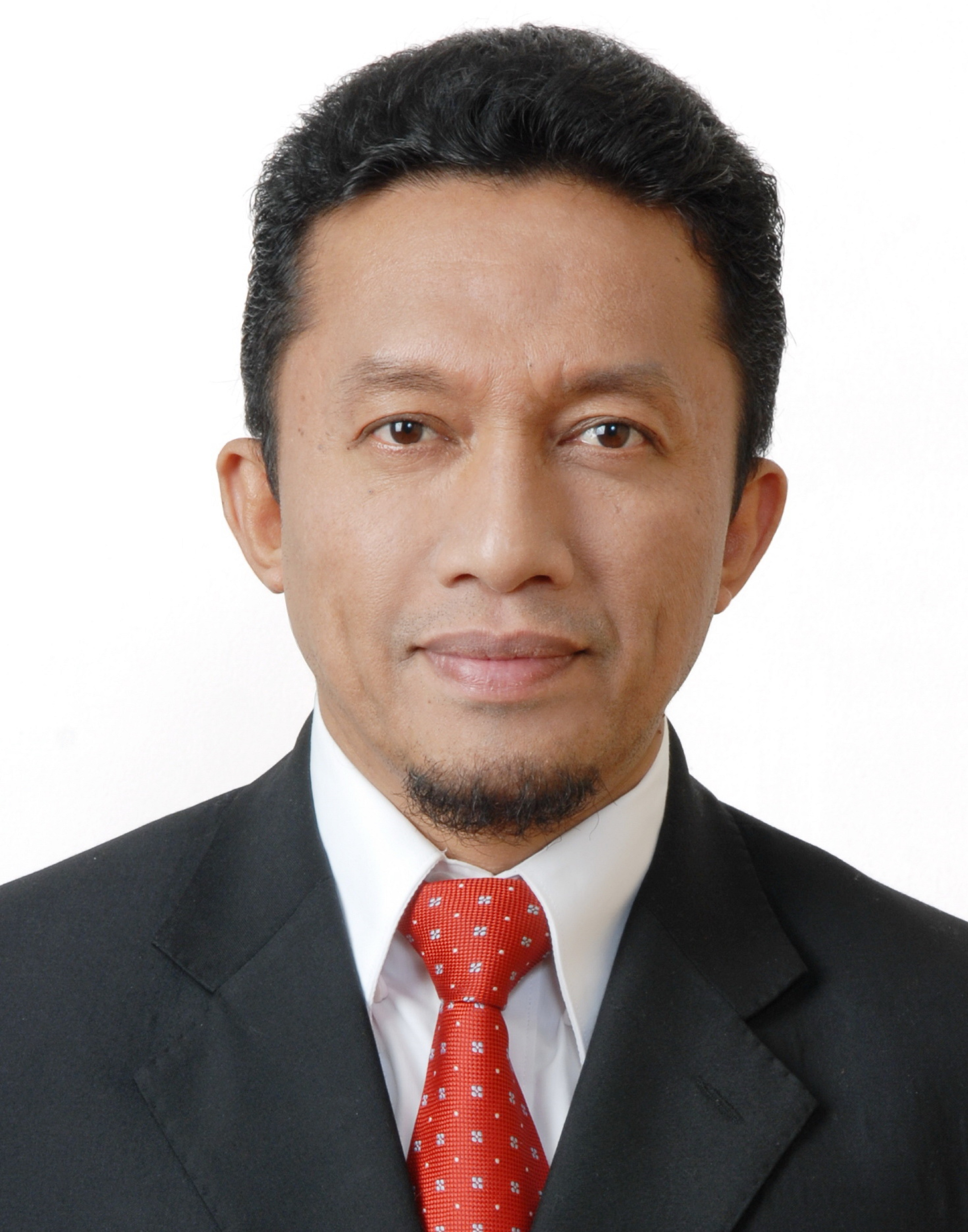

Member of People's Representative Council
- Incumbent
- Assumed office 1 October 2014
- In office 1 October 2009 – 22 October 2009
- Constituency: North Sumatra I

Minister of Communications and Informatics
- In office 22 October 2009 – 1 October 2014
- President: Susilo Bambang Yudhoyono
- Preceded by: Muhammad Nuh
- Succeeded by: Rudiantara

4th President of Prosperous Justice Party
- In office 11 October 2004 – 22 October 2009
- Preceded by: Hidayat Nur Wahid
- Succeeded by: Luthfi Hasan Ishaaq

Personal details
- Born: 28 September 1961 (age 64) Bukittinggi, West Sumatra, Indonesia
- Party: Prosperous Justice Party
- Children: 7

Tifatul Sembiring (born 28 September 1961) is an Indonesian politician. He was chairman of the Prosperous Justice Party and Minister of Communication and Information in the Second United Indonesia Cabinet.

== Biography ==
=== Life and Family ===
His father is of Karo descent and moved to Bukittinggi where he married a Minangkabau woman. Sembiring is the head of a big family in Guguak Tabek Sarojo, Agam, West Sumatra by the title Datuk Tumangguang. He is married to Sri Rahayu and has seven children: Sabrina, Fathan, Ibrahim, Yusuf, Fatimah, Muhammad, and Abdurrahman Sembiring.

=== Education ===
Sembiring has a degree in computer engineering from the Jakarta STI&K Information and Computing Management School (Indonesian: Sekolah Tinggi Ilmu Manajemen Informatika dan Komputer Jakarta STI&K), Jakarta, and was active in several Indonesian Islamic organisations from his student days, such as the Indonesian Student's Association (PII).

== Controversy ==
In 2009, he blamed immorality for a Sumatra earthquake and other natural disasters. As he addressed a Friday prayer meeting in Padang, Sumatra, the minister said "there were many television programmes that destroyed morals. Therefore, natural disasters would continue to occur."

His ambition to filter the internet for 'negative' content, shelved in early 2010 in the face of broad opposition, may be revived after a celebrity sex scandal centred on Ariel (Nazril Irham), which Sembiring controversially linked to the crucifixion of Jesus Christ. The move has the backing of then-president Dr Susilo Bambang Yudhoyono and would involve a blacklist of offensive material monitored by a special task force, which gave birth to the controversial Internet Positif. ("Positive Internet") program.

He has also linked pornography to HIV/AIDS and said that funding to fight the disease was a waste of money, also stating that the widespread availability of Indonesian pornography, mostly featuring students, caused natural disasters. He was much criticized for quoting Adolf Hitler on his Twitter page, posting "the union between two children, when both of them complete each other, this is magic - Adolf Hitler". He was questioned by Indonesian Twitter users for shaking the hand of U.S. First Lady Michelle Obama during her husband's November 2010 trip to Indonesia. His hesitation in condemning the kidnapping of 276 girls by the terrorist group Boko Haram in Nigeria drew criticism and raised questions about his suitability to serve in the government.

In May 2014, the Ministry of Communications and Information Technology tweeted from his account that video sharing site Vimeo would be banned. Citing Indonesia’s controversial anti-pornography law, passed in 2008, the minister said the site included displays of “nudity or nudity-like features”. The ban came at a moment when films made in Indonesia had begun to attract attention on the world stage, with Joshua Oppenheimer’s The Act of Killing joining the ranks of the most acclaimed documentaries of all time.

On 26 February 2016, he tweeted from his account quoting an Islamic hadith that promotes killing people who practice homosexuality. This sparked criticism from the general public, some Muslim scholars, and human rights advocates due to "growing intolerance" towards the LGBT community in Indonesia. He responded to the critics by calling them anti-Prophet Mohammed and anti-Quran but eventually deleted the post yet remained unapologetic. Mardani Ali Sera, Spokesperson for the Prosperous Justice Party (PKS) denied that the death penalty for homosexuality is the party’s official stance. PKS then clarified by differentiating between “LGBT victims” and “LGBT movements”.

== Legislator ==
Sembiring had been elected four times into the People's Representative Council, firstly in the 2009 election where he represented North Sumatra's first electoral district. He was reelected there in 2014, and again in 2019. In the 2019 legislature, Sembiring was the chair of the Prosperous Justice Party's faction. His fourth reelection was in the 2024 election with 92,704 votes.

Political offices
Preceded by Muhammad Nuh	Minister of Communication and Information; 2009–2014	Succeeded by Rudiantara
Party political offices
Preceded by Hidayat Nur Wahid	Chairman of Prosperous Justice Party; 2004–2009	Succeeded by Luthfi Hasan Ishaaq
