= Vena Annisa =

Indonesian broadcaster

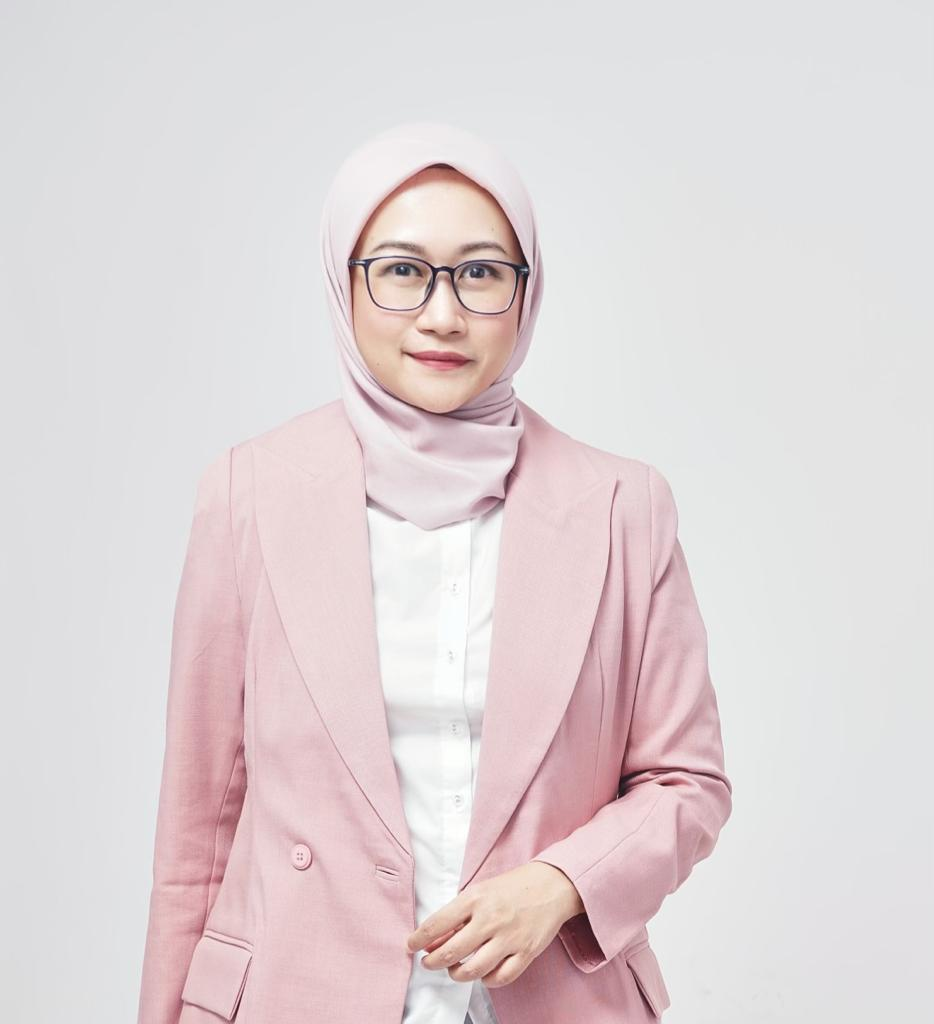
- Born: 1977 (age 48–49); Bandung, Indonesia
- Occupation: Actress Presenter Producer
- Years active: 2000-present

Vena Annisa is a notable Indonesian broadcaster. She works for Voice of America creating programs for Indonesian youths and teens.

== Personal background ==
Vena Annisa Dilianasari was born in Bandung, Indonesia, in August 1977. Vena has 26 years of experience as a practitioner and educator in the communication industry. After working as a broadcaster, TV host, media entrepreneur, and program director at a communication school in Indonesia, the award-winning journalist spent 12 years as an International Broadcaster and Multimedia Journalist for Voice of America in Washington, D.C.

She holds a Bachelor's degree in Communication from the University of Indonesia and a Master's degree in Media Entrepreneurship from the American University in Washington, D.C.

Vena is the CEO and co-founder of V&V Communications, a communication training company.

== Broadcasting career and achievements ==
Upon completing Open Door Exchange Program, she started to work as radio announcer in Prambors radio in Jakarta. At that time, she was the only high-school student announcer. She eventually host the morning prime time segment in Prambors, together with Irfan Ihsan. She then moved into television broadcasting by hosting Buletin Sinetron, an infotainment show in RCTI TV, and various other TV shows.

She founded a production house REC Production in 2002, and produced the first teenager reality show in Indonesia, Katakan Cinta. This show won Panasonic Award for the most popular reality show in 2003.

She is working for VOA, doing youth, teenager, and entertainment segments such as Cek and Ricek and VOA Direct Connection with Irfan Ihsan.
