= Surabaya Shipbuilding State Polytechnic =

Shipbuilding Institute of Polytechnic Surabaya (SHIPS)
- Politeknik Perkapalan Negeri Surabaya (PPNS)
- Type: State Polytechnic
- Affiliations: Paguyuban Politeknik Seluruh Indonesia, Forum Komunikasi Mahasiswa Politeknik Se- Indonesia
- Director: Ir. Eko Julianto, MT, MRINA
- Location: Surabaya, Indonesia
- Website: www.ships.ppns.ac.id

The development of Shipbuilding Institute of Polytechnic Surabaya, or SHIPS (in Indonesian: Politeknik Perkapalan Negeri Surabaya (PPNS)) can be traced back to 1987, when it was established as a polytechnic by Sepuluh Nopember Institute of Technology (ITS) The institute was elevated to an independent institute in 2012.

SHIPS as a state polytechnic offers courses and training in the field of shipbuilding and marine-related industries.

== Facilities ==
Laboratories:

- Automatic Fire Extinguisher Laboratory
- Ergonomic Laboratory
- Workplace Measurement Laboratory
- Chemistry Laboratory
- First Aid Laboratory
- CAD, CAM and Design Laboratory
- Non Metal Workshop (trial pond, mold loft, wooden ship and fiberglass ship workshop, wood dry oven)
- Construction laboratory (plat and profile bending, hydraulic cutting, plat, profile and pipe rolling, furnace, High Rigidity Axial Fid System CNC (3,3 m wide), CNC cutting, SMAW, GMAW and GTAW welding, NCP plasma cutting), Wire cutting (EDM), Injection Molding, etc.
- Material Testing Laboratory (DT and NDT)
- Basic Metal Workshop
- Machining Workshop
- Pneumatic and Hydraulic Laboratory
- Internal Combustion Engine Laboratory
- Marine Diesel Simulator Laboratory
- External Combustion Engine Laboratory
- Fluid and Cold storage system Laboratory
- Instrumentation, Basic Electric and Physic Laboratory
- Electronic, Control and Microprocessor Laboratory
- Electric Machine Laboratory
- Electrical Repair Laboratory
- Power Electronics and Drive Laboratory
- Robotic Camp

== Department and Studies program ==
- 1) Study Program Diploma IV of Safety and Healthy Engineering
- 2) Marine Engineering Department
- 3) Ship Building Engineering Department
- 4) Marine Electrical Engineering Department
