= Electronic Engineering Polytechnic Institute of Surabaya =

State vocational university in East Java, Indonesia

- Politeknik Elektronika Negeri Surabaya
- Logo of EEPIS
- Other name: "PENS JOSS!"
- Motto: Bridge to the Future
- Type: Polytechnic College; State University; Public University; Research institution; Educational institution
- Established: June 2, 1988
- Affiliations: The union of Polytechnic colleges in Indonesia
- President: Ali Ridho Barakbah, S.Kom, Ph.D.
- Academic staff: 536
- Administrative staff: 244
- Students: 5051
- Location: Jl. Raya ITS - Kampus ITS Sukolilo, Surabaya, Jawa Timur, Indonesia; 7°16′35.8″S 112°47′37.9″E
- Campus: Urban, 25,000 m^{2} (270,000 sq ft)
- Colors: Grey Grey
- Website: www.pens.ac.id

- Location in Surabaya

The Electronic Engineering Polytechnic Institute of Surabaya (EEPIS), known in Indonesia as Indonesian: Politeknik Elektronika Negeri Surabaya (PENS) is a state vocational university located in Surabaya, East Java, Indonesia. The polytechnic was established in 1988 as part of a program in Sepuluh November Institute of Technology (ITS). PENS focused on vocation education in science and technology, especially engineering and applied sciences.

Currently, PENS is a leading vocational university Indonesia, offering the nation's first master degree and doctoral degree in applied science. The official ranking from Ministry of Research and Higher Education in 2019 shows PENS as the number 1 polytechnic in Indonesia.

== History ==
The institute was founded with the support and assistance of the Japan International Cooperation Agency (JICA), who sent a team in 1985 to assess the need for aid. Led by Prof. Y. Naito from Tokyo Institute of Technology, the team conducted an initial assessment to the area that resulting agreement for the development of the campus.

In 1987, construction of the institution began. Japan also provided training for EEPIS instructors, both before and after the opening of the school, in Indonesia and Japan. It was officially inaugurated on June 2, 1988, by the Indonesian president Suharto.

Since its inception, the institution has held several names. When it opened, it was the Politeknik Elektronika & Telekomunikasi. From 1992 to 1991 it was entitled Politeknik Elektronika Surabaya, at which time it came under the umbrella of Institut Teknologi Sepuluh Nopember. In 1996, it was retitled to Politeknik Elektronika Negeri Surabaya (PENS).

After 24 years under the statute of Institut Teknologi Sepuluh Nopember, the institution is no longer a part of ITS. The transition year was 2012. Since then, EEPIS is independently separated from ITS and started to stand on its own statute.

== Education ==
As a technical educational institution in the field of applied science, PENS has a long-term vision to provide education platform in the field of EEPIS in cooperation with many local governments in East Java established Community College as an embryo of vocational education in their district. The cooperation begins in the 2002 and the teaching took place in local vocational high school (SMK). In 2014, more than 1500 graduates are supplied by this schema.

== Degrees ==
PENS offers Diploma-III and Diploma-IV Degrees. Diploma-III is a three-year degree course, while Diploma-IV is a four-year course. The Diploma-III graduates will hold associate degree and Diploma-IV graduates will be granted with bachelor of applied science (B.A.Sc) or Sarjana Terapan (S.Tr) in Indonesian.

In 2013, PENS became a pioneer of vocational postgradute degree in Indonesia by opening of Master of Electronics Engineering and Master of Informatics and Computer Engineering. The postgraduate programmes will have more practice in the laboratorium compared to other similar program in academic universities.

In 2016, EEPIS has signed an MoU with GMF AeroAsia to provide a specialized vocational education for the company to fulfill the necessity of skilled graduates with Aircraft Maintenance Training Standard (AMTO) certificate. The graduates will be directly contracted by GMF AeroAsia as a professional worker. In the same year, PLN, an Indonesian government-owned corporation also signed same MoU with mutual schema.

The first Vocational Doctoral Degree in the nation is launched by Directorate General of Vocational, Ministry of Education, Culture, Research and Technology in 2024 with subject of Doctor of Cyber-Physical System.

The programmes that the institution offers in main campus are:

Diploma III / Associate Degree:

1. Electronics Engineering
2. Telecommunications Engineering
3. Industrial Electrical Engineering
4. Information Technology
5. Multimedia Broadcasting Technology

Diploma IV / Bachelor of Applied Science:

1. Electronics Engineering
2. Telecommunications Engineering
3. Industrial Electrical Engineering
4. Information Technology
5. Mechatronics Engineering
6. Computer Engineering
7. Power Generation System
8. Game Technology
9. Internet Engineering Technology
10. Multimedia Engineering Technology
11. Applied Data Science
12. Digital Business
13. Manufacture Design Engineering Technology
14. Safety Engineering Technology

Master Degree of Applied Science:

1. Master of Electronics Engineering
2. Master of Informatics and Computer Engineering

Doctoral of Applied Science:

- Doctor of Cyber-Physical System

There are also programmes offered in outside of main campus, those are:

Lamongan Campus

- Diploma III of Information Technology
- Diploma III of Multimedia Broadcasting Technology

Sumenep Campus

- Diploma III of Information Technology
- Diploma III of Multimedia Broadcasting Technology

== Campus ==
The EEPIS building is located on the campus of Institut Teknologi Sepuluh Nopember. It includes labs as well as classrooms, workshops, offices and student dormitories. It also includes a canteen, libraries and mosques. Mojokerto local district signed a Memorandum of Understanding with EEPIS to expand the main campus to their area in 2017. It is hoped that within this agreement, local society will be able to access higher education easier.
