= Tri Edhi Budhi Soesilo =

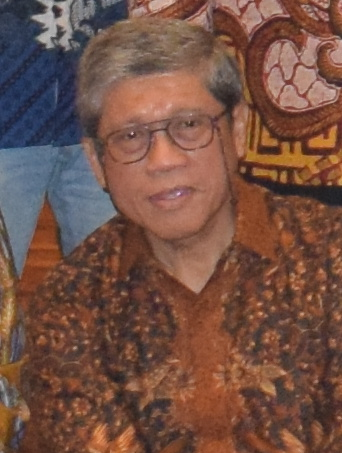

Director of the University of Indonesia School Of Environmental Science
- In office 30 September 2020 (Note: Acting until 26 February 2021) – 26 February 2025
- Preceded by: Emil Budianto
- Succeeded by: Supriatna

Personal details
- Born: January 31, 1961 (age 65) Sukabumi, West Java, Indonesia
- Education: University of Indonesia

Academic background
- Thesis: Dioxin waste control using environmentally-friendly bleach: a study on the use of chlorine-based oxidator in pulp industry by a simulation of system dynamics model for policy analysis (2005)
- Doctoral advisor: Farid Anfasa Moeloek; Muhammadi Siswosudarmo; Haryoto Kusnoputranto

Academic work
- Discipline: Environmental sciences

Tri Edhi Budhi Soesilo (born 31 December 1961) is an Indonesian environmental scientist and a lecturer at the University of Indonesia. He is the director of the university's School of Environmental Science from 2020 until 2025.

== Early life and education ==
Tri Edhi Budhi Soesilo was born in Jakarta, Indonesia on 31 December 1961, as the second of five children to M. Rusdi and Sri Sudarsih. He spent his childhood in South Jakarta, where he completed his primary education at the 1st North Manggarai State Elementary School in 1972, followed by secondary education at the 3rd Manggarai Junior High School in 1975 and the 8th Jakarta State High School in 1979. He then studied medicine at the University of Indonesia.

At his second year in the university, Tri began working as a biology teacher at his high school almamater. He was described as a teacher who made complex biological concepts easy to understand for his students, inspiring his students to study biology. He also became a research mentor to students in the school, especially those in the Science and Library subsections.

He and several of his seniors and juniors from the 8th Jakarta State High School established the BTA 8 tutoring service, which prepared students from the school for university entrance exams. Aside from teaching at his almamater and BTA, he also taught at the Feksos Nonformal Education Center from 1984 to 1985.

He graduated as a physician from the University of Indonesia in 1987. He holds a master's degree and doctorate in environmental science from the University of Indonesia in 1998 and 2005, respectively. He received the cum laude distinction for his doctorate thesis defense.

== Academic career ==
Upon graduating as a physician from the University of Indonesia in 1987, Tri began working as a staff at the cancer surgery department at the Dharma Nugraha Hospital in Matraman, East Jakarta. He continued to teach in several other education institutes, such as the Santa Lusia Nonformal Education Center in Cawang, Santo Lukas Nonformal Education Center, and the 6th Jakarta State High School. After the BTA tutoring service expanded its services to other provinces in Indonesia, Tri also taught at the center's branch in Ambon, Maluku and Manado.

Tri joined the Center for Human Resources and Environmental Research (PPSML, Pusat Penelitian Sumber Daya Manusia dan Lingkungan) at the University of Indonesia as a research staff shortly after receiving his master's degree. He also taught at various departments in the University of Indonesia, and from 2001 to 2004 as an associate lecturer at the Jenderal Soedirman University.

In 2010, Tri becamethe secretary of the environmental sciences major. After completing his term as secretary, in July 2014 Tri became the chair of the major. Under his leadership, in 2015 the major prepared an academic manuscript which advocated for the elevation of the environmental science major into a school. The University of Indonesia School of Environmental Sciences was established in 2016 and Tri became the deputy director of the school a year later.

Following the sudden death of director Emil Budianto on 30 September 2020, Tri became the acting director of the school. After undergoing a series of selection, on 22 February 2021 Tri became the permanent director of the school. He was installed four days later and served for a four-year term until he was replaced by Supriatna.

== Personal life ==
Tri married Susi Soviana in 1989. The couple has two sons and a daughter and currently resides in Bogor.
