= Siti Nurbaya Bakar =

Indonesian politician

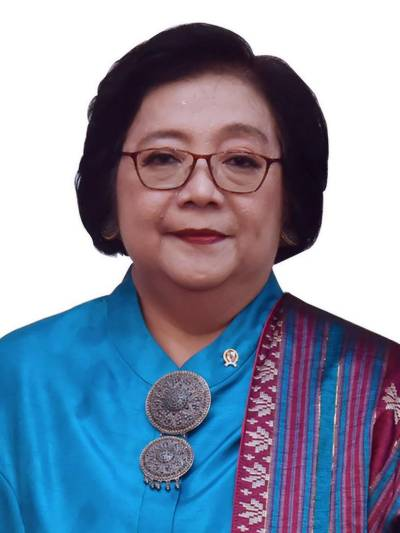
- Portrait in 2019

10th Minister of Environment and Forestry
- In office 27 October 2014 – 20 October 2024
- President: Joko Widodo
- Preceded by: Zulkifli Hasan; Balthasar Kambuaya

Personal details
- Born: 28 July 1956 (age 70) Jakarta, Indonesia
- Spouse: Rusli Rachman
- Children: Meitra Mivida, Ananda Tohpati
- Education: Bogor Agricultural University; ITC Enschede; University of Siegen

Siti Nurbaya Bakar (born 28 July 1956) is the Minister of Environment and Forestry in Indonesian President Joko Widodo's Working Cabinet.

== Early life ==
Siti was born in Jakarta on 28 July 1956, the daughter of Mochammad Bakar, a police officer from Jakarta, and Sri Banon from Lampung province.

After completing SMA Negeri 8 Jakarta high school in Jakarta, she studied at Bogor Agricultural Institute (IPB), earning a degree in engineering.

== Career ==
After graduating from college, she started work in 1981 for the Regional Development Planning Board (Bappeda) in Lampung and remained there for 17 years.

In 1998, she moved back to Jakarta to work in the Home Affairs Ministry. She served as secretary general of the ministry for the 2001–2005 period. She was alleged to have received Rp 100 million in a fire truck procurement deal when she was the secretary general at the Home Affairs Ministry, but she was not pursued by the Corruption Eradication Commission (KPK) because she said the project had involved the minister and the ministry's director general without going through her.

She was appointed by president Susilo Bambang Yudhoyono as secretary general of the Regional Representatives Council (DPD) for 2006–2013.

In January 2013, Siti stepped down from the DPD and joined media tycoon Surya Paloh’s National Democrat Party. In 2014, she was elected to the House of Representatives (DPR), representing Lampung electoral district for the 2014–2019 period. She soon had to retire from the DPR after being appointed Minister of Environment and Forestry by President Joko Widodo.

== Personal life ==
Siti is married to Rusli Rachman and they have two children: Meitra Mivida and Ananda Tohpati.
