= Sepuluh Nopember Institute of Technology =

Public research university in Surabaya, Indonesia

- Institut Teknologi Sepuluh Nopember
- Seal of ITS
- Former name: Sepuluh Nopember Technical College
- Motto: Advancing in Humanity
- Motto in English: Advancing Humanity
- Type: Public nonprofit
- Established: November 10, 1957; 69 years ago
- Affiliations: ASAIHL; ASEA UNINET; Association of Universities of Asia and the Pacific
- Provost: Prof. Ir. Heru Setyawan, M.Eng.
- Rector: Bambang Pramujati, S.T., M.Sc.Eng., Ph.D
- Faculty: 1,012
- Undergraduates: 20,428
- Postgraduates: 2,525
- Location: Surabaya, East Java, Indonesia; 07°16′54″S 112°47′41″E
- Campus: Urban • Sukolilo campus: 1,896,000 m^{2} • Manyar campus: 5,176 m^{2} • Cokroaminoto campus: 4,000 m^{2}
- Alumni: 45,208
- Colors: ITS Dual Blues
- Website: its.ac.id

- ITS campus location

Sepuluh Nopember Institute of Technology (Indonesian: Institut Teknologi Sepuluh Nopember; abbreviated as ITS) is a national public research university located in Surabaya, East Java, with a strong emphasis on scientific, engineering, and vocational education system. Located on 180-hectares green area, ITS is home to more than 1,000 faculty members and over 20,000 undergraduate and graduate students.

ITS was ranked first in Indonesia and 64th globally in the Times Higher Education (THE) Impact Rankings 2021, which assess universities' contributions to the United Nations Sustainable Development Goals. ITS has incorporated sustainability initiatives through its Smart Eco Campus program. The institute has also undertaken several projects related to renewable energy and electric transportation, including the Widya Wahana Project, described as Indonesia's first solar-powered car, and the Jalapatih Project, described as Indonesia's first solar-powered ship.

In 2014, ITS launched an electric bus project, and in 2017 it established a teaching-industry partnership involving GESITS, an electric scooter developed for the Indonesian commercial market. These initiatives have focused on the development and application of renewable-energy and electric-vehicle technologies in Indonesia.

ITS also incorporates student participation in social and environmental activities into its educational programs. Student involvement in environmental initiatives and competitions can be recognized through its credit-based evaluation system as part of the institute's character-building curriculum.

The Indonesian second-oldest public technological institute covers 33 undergraduate programs, six vocational study programs, 20 master programs, 15 doctoral programs, and 20 International Undergraduate Programs (IUP). The institute has established seven programs with international accreditation (IABEE and ABET) and 16 programs with the AUN-QA international certification, with more than 360 international partner-institutions in 52 countries. ITS has been expanding its educational disciplines beyond sciences and engineering into fields such as arts, business management, and development studies. With two Indonesian best polytechnics, Electronic State Polytechnic (PENS) and Shipbuilding State Polytechnic (PPNS), operate independently in the same area as ITS' main campus in Sukolilo, ITS has been continuously transforming the City of Surabaya as a national powerhouse for advanced technological innovation, impactful scientific and engineering research, and best vocational education.

== History ==
=== Early years (20th Century) ===
ITS was founded as an humble technical college on November 10, 1957. In its early years, Angka Nitisastro, a medical doctor who became the first Rector of ITS, announced the student registration from his clinic. Following the suggestion of Indonesian Foreign Minister Ruslan Abdulgani (1914–2005), the establishment charter of ITS was signed by Sukarno (1901–1970), the first president of Republic of Indonesia. Both of them were born in Surabaya, which shared emotional connection with the city. In his speech, President Sukarno emphasized on the Spirit of Sepuluh Nopember, which refers to the legendary heroes who fought against colonialism and imperialism in the Battle of Surabaya on November 10, 1945, and annually being commemorated as Heroes Day in Indonesia. Initially, the small Sepuluh Nopember Technical College had only two departments, Civil Engineering and Mechanical Engineering. Three years later, ITS expanded by opening Electronic Engineering, Naval Architecture and Shipbuilding Engineering, and Chemical Engineering departments.

In 1965, ITS developed two more faculties, Architectural Engineering and the Faculty of Natural Sciences. In 1965, despite socio-political crises in Indonesia, ITS had established seven faculties: Faculty of Civil Engineering, Faculty of Mechanical Engineering, Faculty of Chemical Engineering, Faculty of Electrical Engineering, Faculty of Naval Architecture and Shipbuilding Engineering, and Faculty of Natural Science. In 1972, the campus of the Faculty of Civil Engineering was relocated to Jl. Manyar 8 Surabaya; the ITS campuses was separated. In the late of 1975, the Faculty of Architectural Engineering and Faculty of Natural Science were relocated to Jl. Cokroaminoto 12A, Surabaya. With financial aid from ADB, ITS started to build a large educational complex in eastern Surabaya, 1977.

In the early 1980s, reorganization took place in ITS, and the former faculties were downgraded into departments and merged into common discipline faculties. Hence the new ITS organization comprises four faculties: the Faculty of Mathematics and Natural Sciences, Faculty of Industrial Technology, Faculty of Civil Engineering and Planning, and the Faculty of Marine Technology. In 1988, ITS established its first polytechnic branch, Shipbuilding Polytechnic of Surabaya. This was followed by the second, Electronic Engineering Polytechnic of Surabaya.

=== New Development (21st Century) ===
In 2001, as a response to the visionary speech of President Abdurrahman Wahid in front of the faculties, ITS introduced a faculty of information technology consisting of two departments: Informatics Engineering and Information Systems. Two Indonesian leading polytechnics; Electronic State Polytechnic (PENS) and Shipbuilding State Polytechnic (PPNS) now operate independently on the same area at ITS' main campus in Sukolilo, a region in the eastern part of the City of Surabaya, East Java, that serves as a national center for advanced technological innovation in robotics and artificial intelligence, shipbuilding and marine engineering, clean and renewable energy, and smart city.

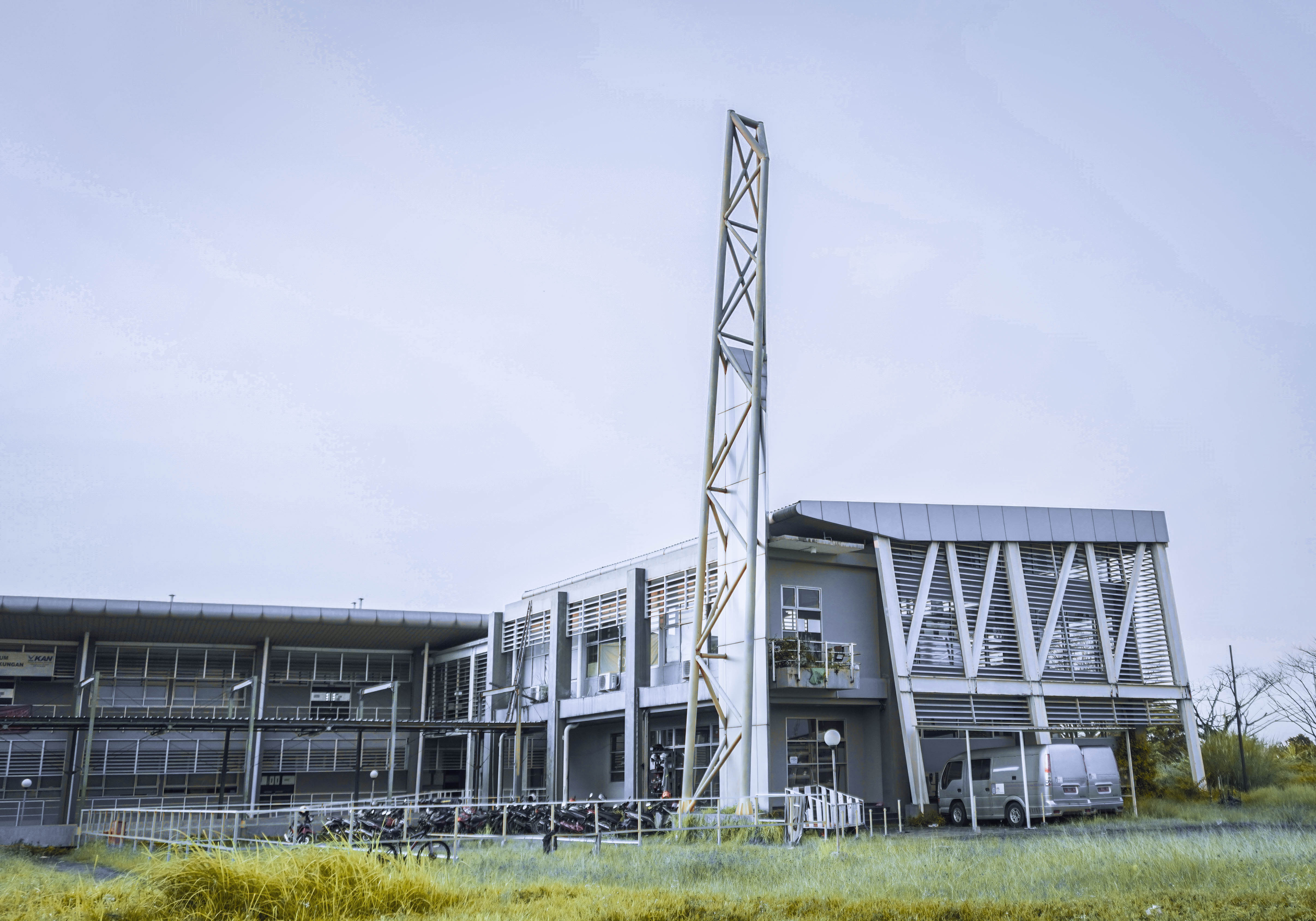
Back Parking lot of ITS Robotics Center

Today, ITS has three campus areas: Cokroaminoto, Manyar, and Sukolilo as the largest educational complex. In 2013, as a technological institute founded by a medical doctor, Angka Nitisastro, ITS marks its engagement to the advanced medical research by graduating its first doctoral graduate on medical engineering, Ingrid Nurtanio, lecturer at University of Hassanuddin. Muhammad Nuh initiated Indonesia's first undergraduate program Biomedical Engineering in 2007, which historically reconnect ITS to its early years when the newly born institute was led by a medical doctor, Angka Nitisastro.

== Campuses ==
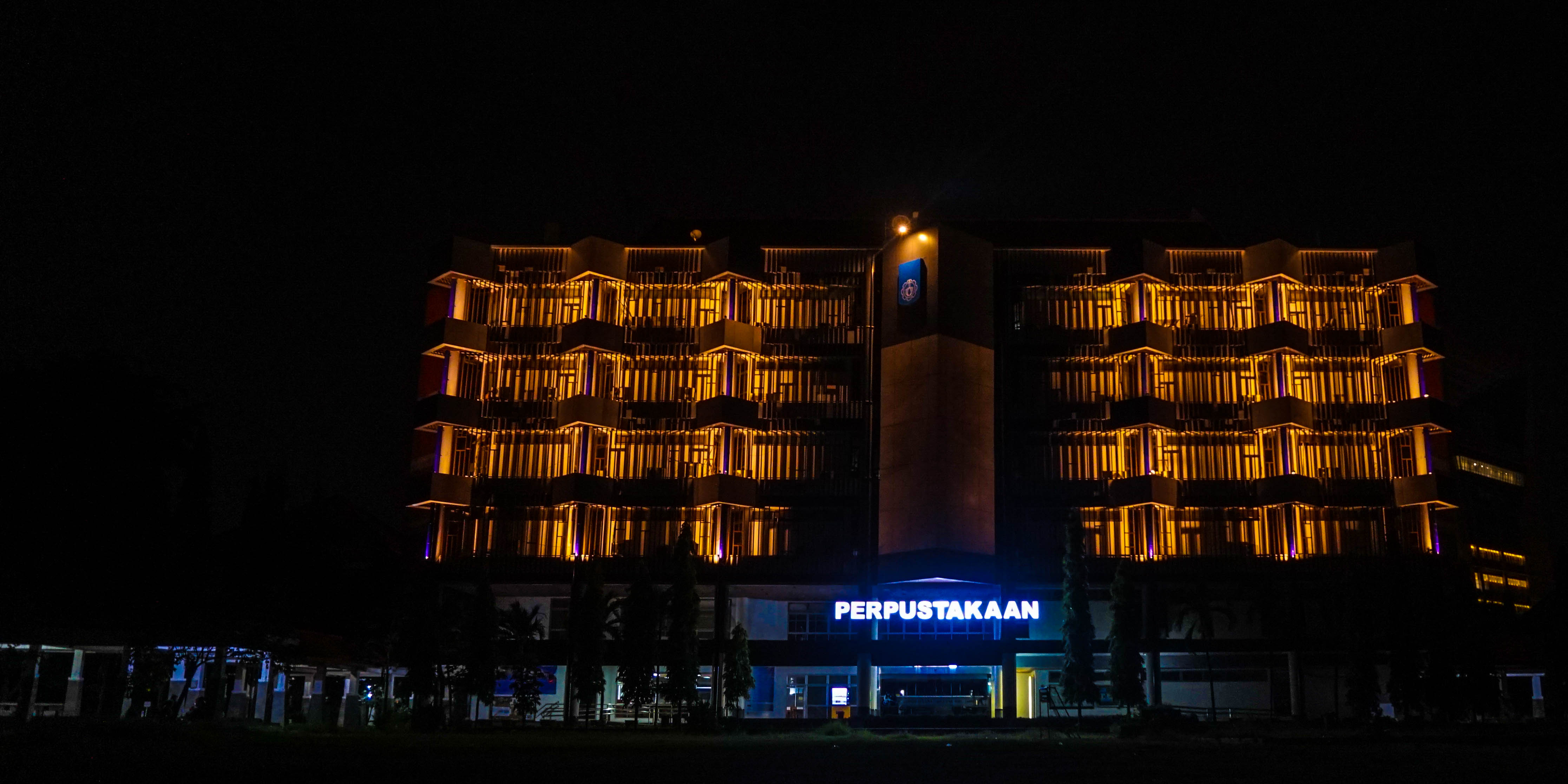
ITS Main Library

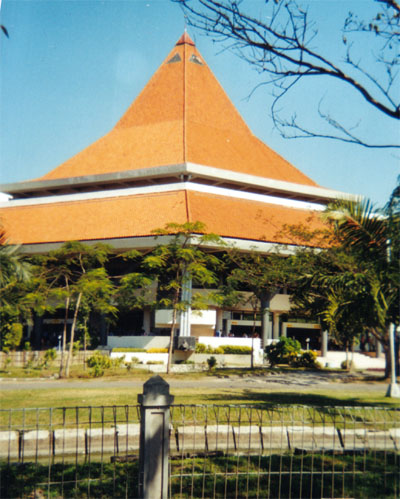
Graha Sepuluh Nopember, ITS Main Hall

=== Location ===
ITS is located in the City of Surabaya, the second-largest city in Indonesia.

Research Tower

Sciences Tower

ITS operates three campuses in Surabaya. Its main campus is located at Sukolilo, wherein all undergraduate programs are delivered, along with the postgraduate buildings, administrative building, main library, faculties housing, student community center, central cafeteria, football stadium, jogging track, and student dormitory that can accommodate 1200 freshmen. A smaller campus is located in Manyar district, providing a Civil Engineering diploma course. The third campus is located at Cokroaminoto Street, providing a postgraduate Technology Management Magister course.

== Academic facilities and campus life ==
December 14, 2010, President Dr. Susilo Bambang Yudhoyono officially signed the establishment of the Robotics Center Building (Gedung Pusat Robotika) in ITS' campus, Sukolilo, the Indonesian largest technological center for robotics and AI's research. Overall, ITS operates academic facilities on a land area of 187 hectares. ITS hosts graduation ceremony twice in an academic year in a main hall with a capacity of 4,000 occupants. Sport facilities can be found on the campus: a stadium and football ground, futsal courts, basketball courts, tennis courts, wall climbing, gymnasium and indoor badminton courts, rafting canal and jogging tracks.

== Faculties and departments ==
There are 9 faculties and 1 school, some departments offer diploma programs.

In early 2016, the Department of Industrial Engineering achieved ABET accreditation. In early 2015, the Department of Informatics, Department of Statistics and Department of Environmental Engineering also achieved AUN accreditation.

== Research and achievements ==
ITS is known for the systematic inclusion of student activism in its methodical curriculum; practical engagement in socio-technological activity is formally rewarded through its credit-based evaluation system as part of its character-building curriculum. Within this system, undergraduate student must pass the minimum numbers of required credit of social engagement in order to graduate from the institute. Undergraduate students are supervised by selected faculty members in technological project that deals with environmental or social issues for local, national, or international scale. Involvement in national and international competition are encouraged in order to integrate in-class learning and out-of-class impact.

=== Naval architecture ===
ITS launched Indonesia's first solar-powered ship, and took part in a world competition, Dong Energy Challenge, in 2014 in the Netherlands. In 2012, ITS participated in the Atlantic Challenge at Bantry, Ireland, and won The Spirit of Atlantic Challenge.

=== Robotic engineering ===
In 2012, a team of students was given the Toyota Award at the ABU Asia-Pacific Robot Contest (ABU Robocon) in Hong Kong. Two years later, a team of students was given the Second Runner Up and Best Engineering Award at the ABU Asia-Pacific Robot Contest (ABU Robocon) in Pune, India. In 2016, a team of students (ICHIRO) was given 10 medals at 21st FIRA Hurocup in Beijing, China. In the same year, a team of students (Barunastra) was given The Second Runner Up and Best Speed and Maneuverability at 9TH Annual International RoboBoat Competition - AUVSI Foundation in Virginia, USA. A year later, a team of students (ICHIRO) was given 14 medals at 22nd FIRA Hurocup in Kaohsiung, Taiwan.

=== Concept car ===
ITS launched Indonesia's first solar-powered car, Widya Wahana. It was tested in Australia, in a world solar car competition. In 2012, the urban energy-efficient concept car, Sapu Angin, won the Asia Pacific energy-saving car competition, Shell Eco Marathon Asia 2012, at Sepang, Malaysia. A year later, ITS (Sapu Angin Speed) won the Best Rookie Award of ICV at Student Formula Japan. Additionally, ITS won the Shell Helix Tribology Award (off-track award) at Shell Eco-Marathon Asia 2013. In the same year, Spectronic VI from ITS won first place among presentation posters and third place in competition at the Chem-e-car Competition in Chemeca 2013, in Brisbane, Australia. 2015, ITS won the Shell Eco Marathon (SEM) Asia 2015, in Manila, the Philippines, in the urban concept diesel category.

=== Electric vehicles ===
The institute launched and operated Indonesia's first electric bus in 2014 and Indonesia's first teaching industry (Gesits Project) that produces electric scooter for national commercial market in 2017 in order to transform Indonesia's fossil-based transportation fuel into the green technology.

=== Research ===
- Research and Society Service Centre (LPPM)
  - Environmental Centre
  - Energy Centre
  - Earth and Disaster Mitigation Centre
  - Marine Centre
  - Industrial Centre
  - IT & Multimedia Communication Centre
  - Continuing Education Unit
  - Intellectual Property Rights Unit
- RIMA-ITS (Research Institute For Web and Mobile Application - ITS)
- Laboratory for Housing and Human Settlements
- Robotic Research Centre

== Rankings ==
University rankings

Global – Overall
- QS World: =509 (2026)
- QS Employability: 301-500 (2022)

Regional – Overall
- QS Asia: 114 (2025)

The QS Asia University Rangkings 2024 has ranked Institut Teknologi Sepuluh Nopember (ITS Surabaya) as number 146. In 2023, ITS was ranked 621-630 worldwide according to the Top QS World University Rankings 2024, as well as ranked 146th in the Top QS Asian University Rankings 2024 (sixth in Indonesia after Gadjah Mada University, Bandung Institute of Technology, University of Indonesia, Airlangga University and Bogor Agricultural University).

=== Subject ===
QS World University Rankings by Subject 2026

World rank	Subject
151 – 200	▲ Architecture & Built Environment
201 – 250	
251 – 300	
301 – 350	▲ Chemical Engineering
351 – 400	▲ Electrical and Electronic Engineering; ▲ Mechanical, Aeronautical & Manufacturing Engineering
401 – 450	▲ Computer Science and Information Systems
451 – 500	
501 – 550	Mathematics
551 – 600	Business & Management Studies; Physics & Astronomy
601 – 650	Chemistry

QS by Clusters (2026)
Subject	Global	National
Arts & Humanities	-	-
Engineering and Technology	▲266	▲3
Life Sciences & Medicine	-	-
Natural Sciences	-	-
Social Sciences & Management	-	-

THE World University Rankings by Subject 2026
Subject	Global	National
Arts & humanities	-	-
Business & economics	▲801-1000	8
Computer science	801-1000	▲4
Education	-	-
Engineering	1001-1250	▲4
Law	201-250	▼2
Life sciences	1001+	▼9
Medical & Health	-	-
Physical sciences	▲1001-1250	▲5
Psychology	-	-
Social sciences	▼801-1000	▼7

== Student activities ==
ITS students participate in sports competitions. In 2015, Seaborg ITS's team won first place at College Bowl 2015, the largest football league held by Indonesian Flag Football Association (IFFA). Maritime Challenge ITS's team won first place at Atlantic Challenge International (ACI) 2014 in the Oar and Sail category, in France.

ITS has a variety of student organizations involved in politics, religion, sports, the arts, and other activities. These include:

- Student Executive Organization
- Student Legislative
- Manarul 'Ilmi Masjid Members
- PLH Siklus ITS, students' environmental organization
- ITS Students Choir
- ITS Foreign Language Society (IFLS)
- CLICK ITS, students' film and cinematography organization
- ITS Radio
- Pramuka ITS
- "Tiyang Alit" Theatre
- "Dr Angka" students cooperative
- Workshop of Entrepreneurship & Technology (WE&T-ITS)
- Maritime Challenge
- Loedroek ITS - traditional East Java play, converted to a more modern and contemporary style
- ITS Muay Thai Association
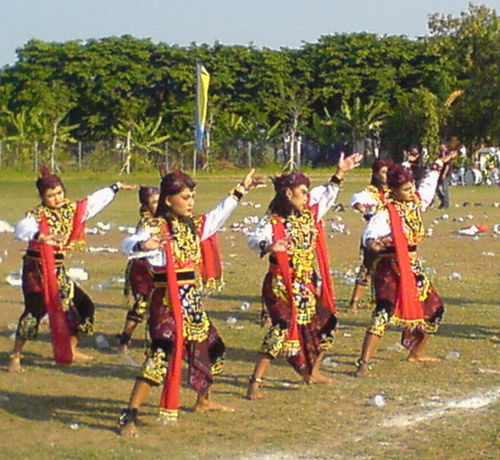
  Tari Remo (Remo Dance) was performed at the 45th anniversary of ITS
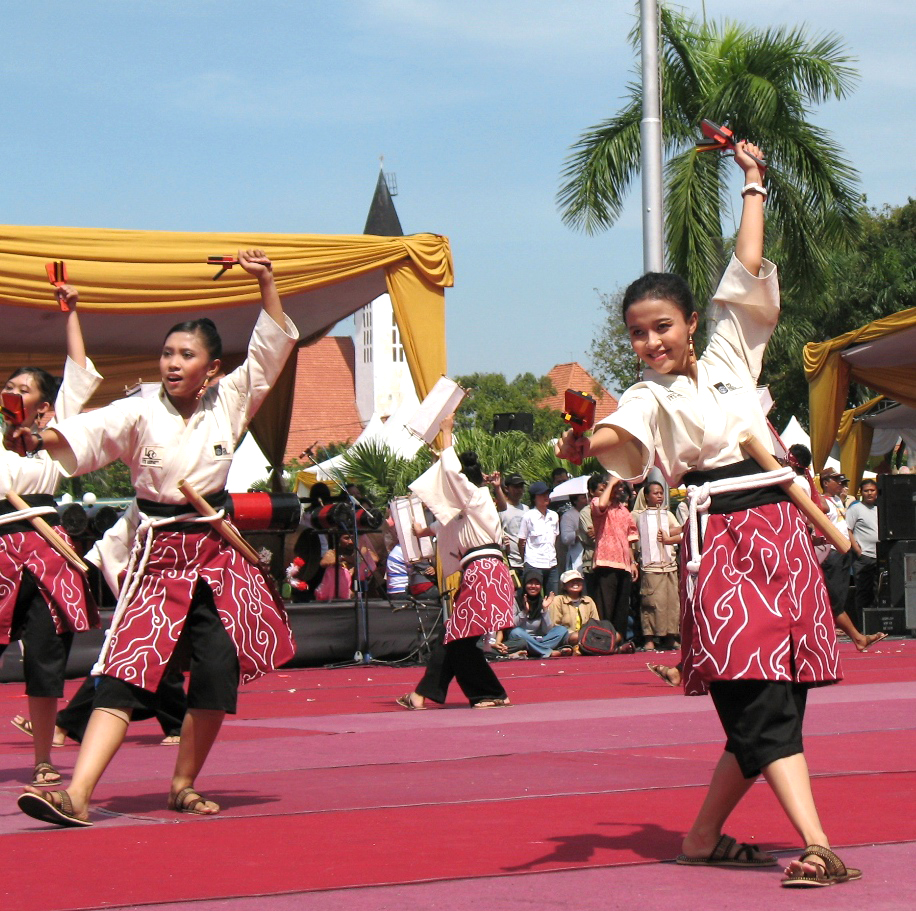
  Yosakoi dance, performed by ITS's team in Surabaya, during a Surabaya and Kōchi sister-cities celebration
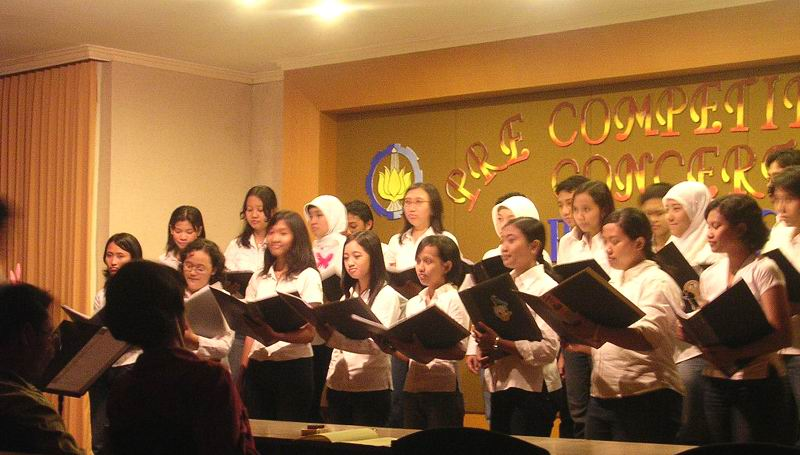
  ITS student choir in a contest

== Notable alumni ==
- Tri Rismaharini, former mayor of Surabaya (2010–2020) and Minister of Social Affairs of the Republic of Indonesia (2020–present); graduated from the Department of Architecture.
- Muhammad Nuh, Minister of Education and Culture of the Republic of Indonesia (2009 – 2014); graduated from the Department of Electrical Engineering.
- Agus Rahardjo, Head of the Corruption Eradication Commission (2015 – 2019); graduated from the Department of Civil Engineering.
- Nova Iriansyah, Governor of Aceh (2020–present); graduated from the Department of Architecture.
- Eri Cahyadi, Mayor of Surabaya (2021–present); graduated from the Department of Civil Engineering.
- Vandiko Gultom, Regent of Samosir (2021–present); graduated from the Department of Civil Engineering.
- Putri Raemawasti, journalist and Miss Universe Indonesia 2008 (Puteri Indonesia 2007); went to the Department of Industrial Engineering.

=== Dropped out ===
- Susilo Bambang Yudhoyono, President of the Republic of Indonesia (2004 - 2014) and songwriter; dropped out of the Department of Mechanical Engineering.
- Gombloh, folk singer-songwriter; dropped out of the Department of Architecture.
- Leo Kristi, folk singer-songwriter; dropped out of the Department of Architecture.
- Jonas Rivanno Wattimena, actor and singer; dropped out of the Department of Environmental Engineering.
