= Mohammad Nuh =

Indonesian former politician

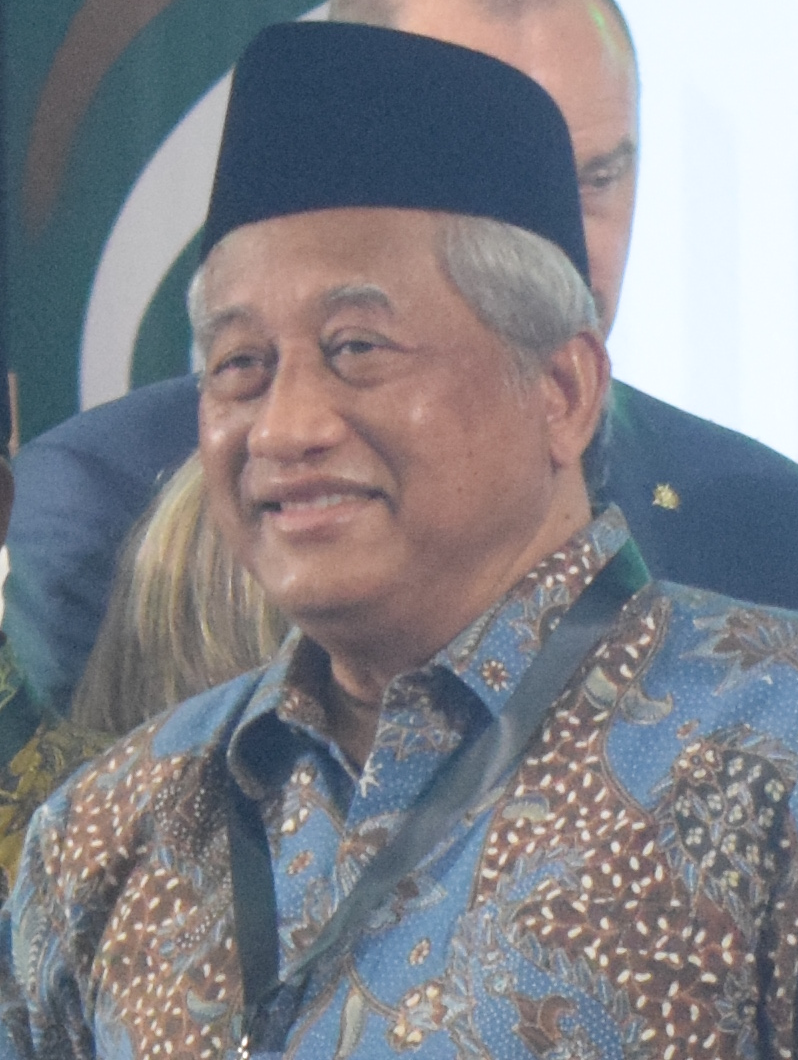
- Mohammad Nuh in 2024

26th Minister of Education and Culture of Indonesia
- In office 22 October 2009 – 21 October 2014
- President: Susilo Bambang Yudhoyono
- Vice President: Boediono
- Preceded by: Bambang Sudibyo
- Succeeded by: Anies Baswedan

Minister of Communication and Information of Indonesia
- In office 9 May 2007 – 21 October 2009
- President: Susilo Bambang Yudhoyono
- Preceded by: Sofyan Djalil
- Succeeded by: Tifatul Sembiring

Rector of Sepuluh Nopember Institute of Technology
- In office 13 April 2003 – 13 April 2007
- Preceded by: Soegiono
- Succeeded by: Priyo Suprobo

Personal details
- Born: 17 June 1959 (age 67) Surabaya, East Java, Indonesia
- Spouse: Layly Rahmawati
- Education: Sepuluh Nopember Institute of Technology
- Occupation: Academician

Mohammad Nuh (born 17 June 1959 in Surabaya) is an Indonesian former politician. He is a former Minister of Education and Culture of Indonesia in the Second United Indonesia Cabinet of Susilo Bambang Yudhoyono.

Nuh was born on 17 June 1959 in Surabaya into a large farming family. By profession an electrical engineer, he was educated at Sepuluh Nopember Institute of Technology and Montpellier 2 University, France.
