= 16th legislature of Antigua and Barbuda =

Parliament of Antigua and Barbuda (2023-present)

←	15th	17th	→
- Coat of arms of Antigua and Barbuda

Overview
- Legislative body: Parliament of Antigua and Barbuda
- Meeting place: St. John's
- Term: 18 January 2023 – 1 April 2026
- Election: 2023 Antiguan general election
- Government: Labour
- Opposition: UPP, BPM

Crown of Antigua and Barbuda
- Monarch: Charles III
- Governor-General: Sir Rodney Williams

Senate
- President: Alincia Williams-Grant
- Deputy President: Vacant

House of Representatives
- Speaker: Osbert Frederick
- Deputy Speaker: Robin Yearwood (until 18 February 2026); Randy Baltimore (from 27 March 2026)

The 16th legislature of Antigua and Barbuda served from the 2023 Antiguan general election on 18 January 2023 until its dissolution on 1 April 2026.

== Members ==
=== Senate ===
The Senate was appointed on 23 January 2023.

Position	Senator	Source
President of the Senate	Alincia Williams-Grant	
Leader of Government Business	Shenella Mary Shadida Govia	
Government Senator	Cheryl Mary Clare Hurst	
Government Senator	Kiz Johnson	
Government Senator	Philip Shoul	
Government Senator	Colin O'Neil Browne	
Government Senator	Dwayne George	
Government Senator	Michael Joseph	
Government Senator	Michael Freeland	
Government Senator (Barbuda representative)	Knacyntar Nedd	
Government Senator	Lamin Newton	
Opposition Senator	Pearl Quinn-Williams	
Opposition Senator	Johnathan Joseph	
Opposition Senator	Alex Browne	
Opposition Senator	David Massiah	
Independent Senator (Governor General’s representative)	Jamilla Kirwan	
Barbuda Senator (Barbuda Council)	Fabian Jones	

==== Changes to Senate during session ====
- Dwayne George sworn in on 3 August 2023; replacing Caleb Gardiner.
- Dwayne George resigns on 29 September 2023.
- Dwayne George sworn in on 26 October 2023.
- Cheryl Mary Clare Hurst announced on 21 August 2024 that she would be stepping down from the Senate for personal reasons. She is scheduled to be replaced by Richie Richardson.
- Samantha Marshall resigns on 12 November 2024, replaced by Michael Joseph.
- Osbert Frederick resigns on 14 November 2024.
- Shawn Nicholas resigns on 19 November 2024.
- Pearl Quinn-Williams sworn in on 25 November 2024.
- Lamin Newton sworn in on 29 November 2024.
- Rawdon Turner resigns on 27 December 2024.
- Michael Freeland sworn in on 21 March 2025.
- Kiz Johnson resigns on 24 October 2025.
- Jamilla Kirwan sworn in on 28 November 2025.
- Clement Antonio resigns on 5 December 2025.
- Kiz Johnson sworn in on 5 December 2025.
- Alex Browne resigns on 18 February 2026.
- Alex Browne sworn in on 31 March 2026.

=== House of Representatives ===
Political party	Member	Constituency
ABLP	Honourable Gaston Browne – Prime Minister	St. John's City West
ABLP	Honourable Steadroy Cutie Benjamin	St. John's City South
ABLP	Honourable Maria Bird-Browne	St. John's Rural East
ABLP	Honourable Randy Baltimore	St. Phillip North
ABLP	Honourable Molwyn Joseph	St. Mary's North
ABLP	Honourable Daryll Mathew	St. John's Rural South
ABLP	Honourable Everly Paul Chet Greene	St. Paul
ABLP	Honourable Charles Fernandez	St. John's Rural North
ABLP	Honourable Melford Walter Nicholas	St. John's City East
ABLP	Honourable Rawdon Turner	St. Peter
BPM	Honourable Trevor Walker	Barbuda
UPP	Honourable Richard Lewis	St. John's Rural West
UPP	Honourable Sherfield Bowen	St. Phillip South
UPP	Honourable Kelvin Simon	St. Mary's South
UPP	Honourable Algernon Watts	St. George
Independent	Honourable Anthony Smith	All Saints West
UPP	Honourable Jamale Pringle – Leader of the Opposition	All Saints East & St. Luke
None	Honourable Osbert Frederick	None (Speaker of the House of Representatives)

==== Changes to the House during session ====
- Kelvin Simon resigns on 7 June 2023.
- Kelvin Simon re-elected on 24 October 2023.
- Anthony Smith changes political affiliation on 15 July 2024.
- Asot Michael assassinated on 4 November 2024.
- Gerald Watt resigns as Speaker on 18 November 2024.
- Osbert Frederick elected as Speaker on 18 November 2024.
- Rawdon Turner elected on 15 January 2025.
- Robin Yearwood resigns on 18 February 2026.
- Randy Baltimore sworn in on 27 March 2026.
