= 17th legislature of Antigua and Barbuda =

Parliament of Antigua and Barbuda (2026-present)

←	16th	18th	→
- Coat of arms of Antigua and Barbuda

Overview
- Legislative body: Parliament of Antigua and Barbuda
- Meeting place: St. John's
- Term: 30 April 2026 – present
- Election: 2026 Antiguan general election
- Government: Labour
- Opposition: UPP, BPM

Crown of Antigua and Barbuda
- Monarch: Charles III
- Governor-General: Sir Rodney Williams

Senate
- President: Alincia Williams-Grant
- Deputy President: Phillip Shoul

House of Representatives
- Speaker: Osbert Frederick
- Deputy Speaker: Philmore Benjamin

The 17th legislature of Antigua and Barbuda served from the 2026 Antiguan general election on 30 April 2026.

== Members ==
=== Senate ===
Government senators were sworn in on 8 May 2026. All opposition senators were sworn in on 11 May 2026 except Malaka Parker. Jamilla Kirwan was sworn in on 12 May 2026. Tiffany Strann-Peters was sworn in on 14 May. Fabian Jones was sworn in on 29 June 2026.

Position	Senator	Source
Government Senator	Alincia Williams-Grant	
Government Senator	Shenella Mary Shadida Govia	
Government Senator	Shaquan O'Neil	
Government Senator	Abena St. Luce	
Government Senator	Joel Rayne	
Government Senator	Angelica O'Donoghue	
Government Senator	Colin O'Neil Browne	
Government Senator	Phillip Shoul	
Government Senator	Lamin Newton	
Government Senator	Tiffany Strann-Peters	
Government Senator (Barbuda representative)	Kendra Beazer	
Opposition Senator	Chester Hughes	
Opposition Senator	Jonathan Wehner	
Opposition Senator	Malaka Parker	
Opposition Senator	Ashworth Azille	
Independent Senator (Governor General’s representative)	Jamilla Kirwan	
Barbuda Senator (Barbuda Council)	Fabian Jones	

=== House of Representatives ===
Political party	Member	Constituency
ABLP	Gaston Browne	St. John's City West
ABLP	Steadroy Benjamin	St. John's City South
ABLP	Maria Browne	St. John's Rural East
ABLP	Randy Baltimore	St. Phillip North
ABLP	Philmore Benjamin	St. Mary's North
ABLP	Daryll Mathew	St. John's Rural South
ABLP	Chet Greene	St. Paul
ABLP	Charles Fernandez	St. John's Rural North
ABLP	Melford Nicholas	St. John's City East
ABLP	Rawdon Turner	St. Peter
ABLP	Michael Joseph	St. John's Rural West
ABLP	Kiz Nathaniel-Johnson	St. Phillip South
ABLP	Dwayne George	St. Mary's South
ABLP	Michael Freeland	St. George
ABLP	Anthony Smith Jr.	All Saints West
UPP	Jamale Pringle	All Saints East & St. Luke
BPM	Trevor Walker	Barbuda
–	Osbert Frederick	None (Speaker of the House of Representatives)
