= 15th legislature of Antigua and Barbuda =

Parliament of Antigua and Barbuda (2018–2023)

←	14th	16th	→
- Coat of arms of Antigua and Barbuda

Overview
- Legislative body: Parliament of Antigua and Barbuda
- Meeting place: St. John's
- Term: 21 March 2018 – 16 December 2022
- Election: 2018 Antiguan general election

Crown of Antigua and Barbuda
- Monarch: Elizabeth II; Charles III
- Governor-General: Sir Rodney Williams

Senate
- President: Alincia Williams-Grant
- Deputy President: Osbert Frederick

House of Representatives
- Speaker: Gerald Watt
- Deputy Speaker: Londell Benjamin

The 15th legislature of Antigua and Barbuda was elected on 21 March 2018, and was dissolved on 16 December 2022.

== Members ==
=== Senate ===
Position	Senator
President of the Senate	Alincia Williams-Grant
Deputy President of the Senate	Osbert Richard Frederick
Leader of Government Business	Cheryl Mary Clare Hurst
Government Senator	Colin O'Neil Browne
Government Senator	Gail Christian
Government Senator	Shenella Mary Shadida Govia
Government Senator	Aziza Lake
Government Senator	Eustace 'Teco' Lake
Government Senator	Maureen Payne-Hyman
Government Senator (Barbuda representative)	Knacyntar Nedd
Government Senator	Philip Shoul
Opposition Senator	Johnathan Joseph
Senate Minority Leader	Richard Lewis
Opposition Senator	Shawn Nicholas
Opposition Senator	Damani Tabor
Independent Senator (Governor General's Representative)	Bakesha Francis-James
Barbuda Senator (Barbuda Council)	Fabian Jones

=== House of Representatives ===
Political Party	Member	Constituency
ABLP	Gaston Browne - Prime Minister	St. John's City West
ABLP	Steadroy Cutie Benjamin - Deputy Prime Minister	St. John's City South
ABLP	Maria Bird-Browne	St. John's Rural East
ABLP	Robin Kenworth Montgomery Yearwood	St. Phillip North
ABLP	Asot Anthony Michael	St. Peter
ABLP	Molwyn Joseph	St. Mary's North
ABLP	Daryll Mathew	St. John's Rural South
ABLP	Everly Paul Chet Greene	St. Paul
ABLP	Samantha Marshall	St. Mary's South
ABLP	Charles Fernandez	St. John's Rural North
ABLP	Melford Walter Nicholas	St. John's City East
BPM	Trevor Walker - Leader of the Barbuda People's Movement	Barbuda
ABLP	Michael Browne	All Saints West
ABLP	Dean Jonas	St. George
ABLP	Londell Benjamin - Deputy Speaker	St. John's Rural West
ABLP	Lennox Weston	St. Phillip South
UPP	Jamale Pringle - Leader of the Opposition	All Saints East & St. Luke
None	Sir. Gerald Watt QC	None (Speaker of the House of Representatives)
