= List of members of the Senate (Antigua and Barbuda) =

This is a list of members of the Senate, the upper house of the Parliament of Antigua and Barbuda. The Senate was last appointed following the 2026 Antiguan general election.

== Party affiliation ==
Affiliation	Members
Antigua and Barbuda Labour Party	11
United Progressive Party	4
Barbuda People's Movement	1
Independent	1
Total	17

The Barbuda People's Movement-led Barbuda Council is represented by Fabian Jones. The other opposition senators are members of the United Progressive Party. Jamilla Kirwan is an independent senator. The remaining senators represent the Antigua and Barbuda Labour Party.

== Leadership ==
Position	Senator
President of the Senate	Alincia Williams-Grant
Deputy President of the Senate	Philip Shoul
Leader of Government Business	Shenella Govia
Deputy Leader of Government Business	–
Senate Minority Leader	Chester Hughes

== List of senators ==
Last appointed: 2026

Category	Barbuda?	Senator	Party	Assumed office
Government	No	Alincia Williams-Grant	Labour	24 June 2014
Government	No	Angelica O'Donoghue	Labour	8 May 2026
Government	No	Lamin Newton	Labour	29 November 2024
Government	No	Shaquan O'Neil	Labour	8 May 2026
Government	No	Shenella Govia	Labour	24 June 2014
Government	No	Joel Rayne	Labour	8 May 2026
Government	No	Philip Shoul	Labour	26 March 2018
Government	No	Colin O'Neil Browne	Labour	26 March 2018
Government	No	Abena St. Luce	Labour	8 May 2026
Government	Yes	Kendra Beazer	Labour	8 May 2026
Government	No	Tiffany Strann-Peters	Labour	14 May 2026
Opposition	No	Chester Hughes	United Progressive Party	11 May 2026
Opposition	No	Jonathan Wehner	United Progressive Party	11 May 2026
Opposition	No	Malaka Parker	United Progressive Party	18 May 2026
Opposition	No	Ashworth Azille	United Progressive Party	11 May 2026
Barbuda Council	Yes	Fabian Jones	Barbuda People's Movement	28 March 2018
Governor-General's	No	Jamilla Kirwan	Independent	28 November 2025
