= 2026 Antiguan general election =

- 30 April 2026

All 17 seats in the House of Representatives 9 seats needed for a majority
- Registered: 63,313
- Turnout: 62.41% (▼7.93pp)
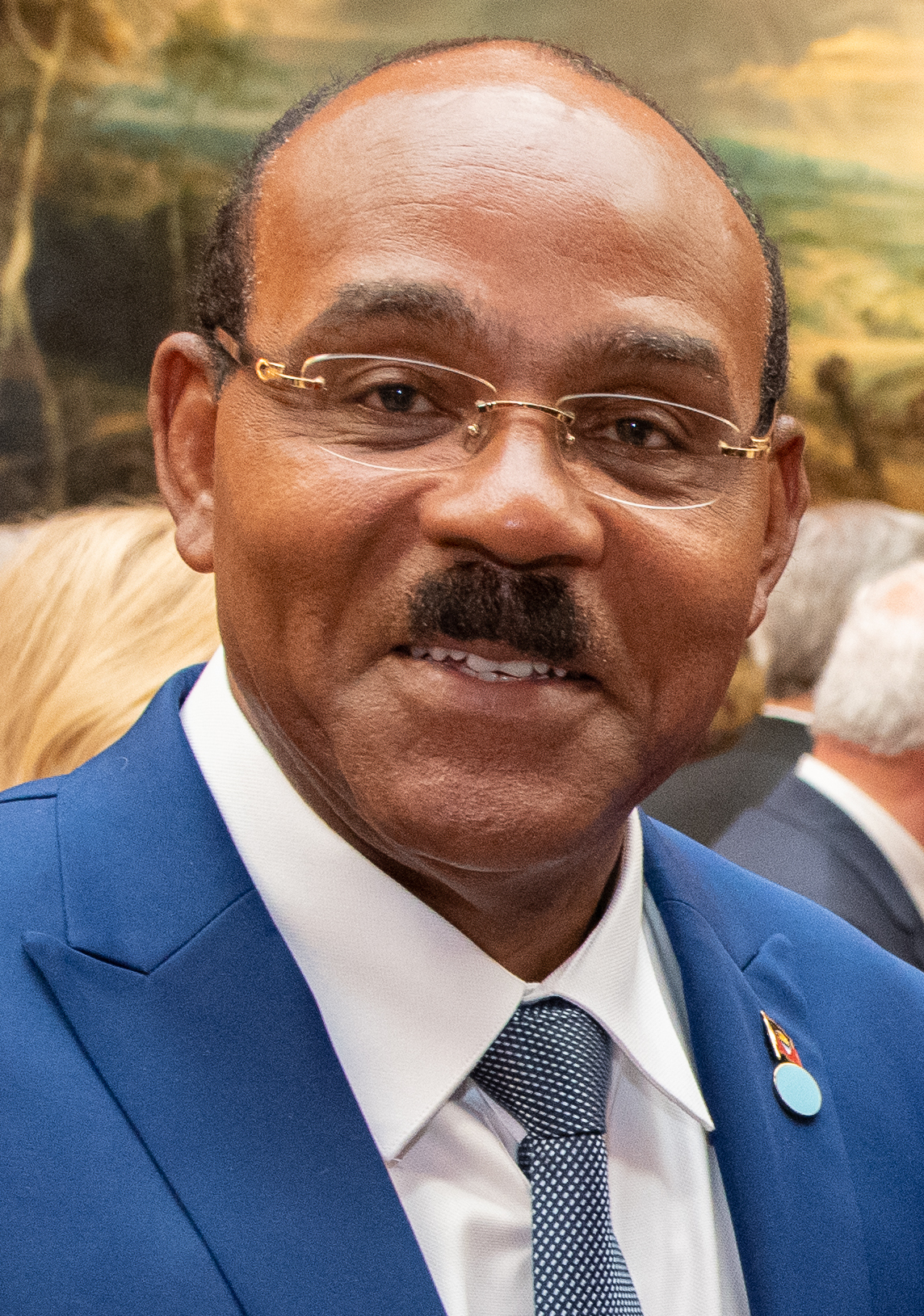

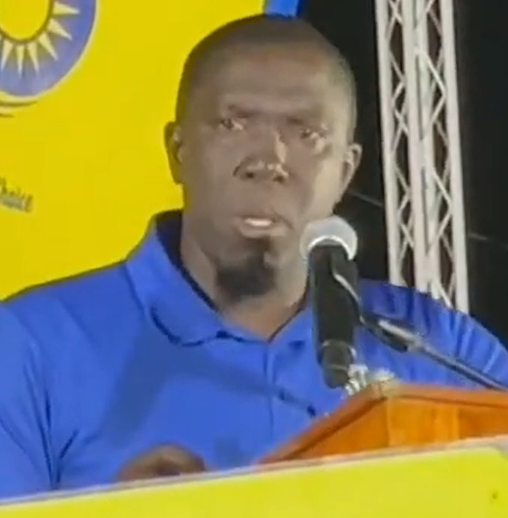

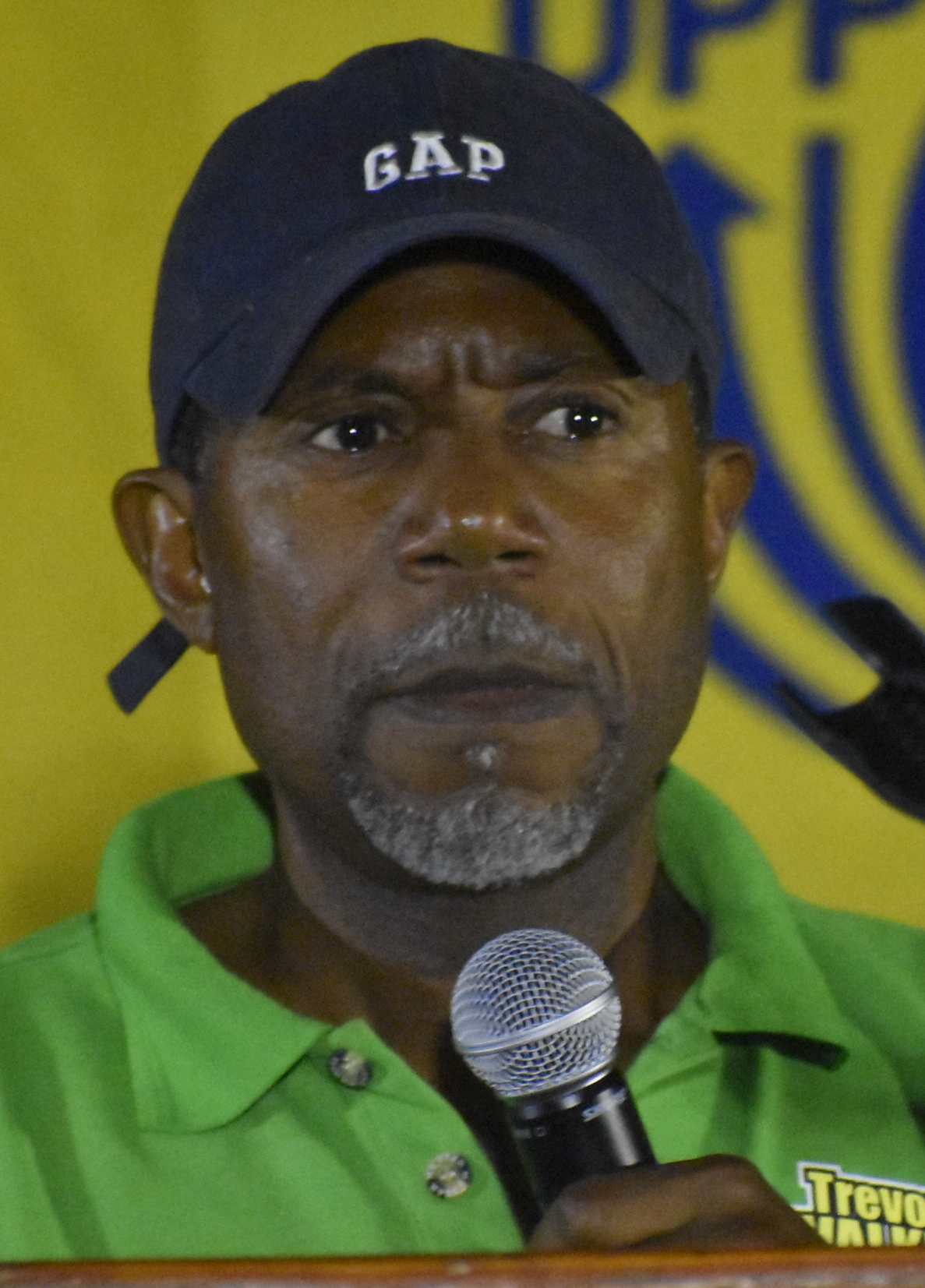
	First party	Second party	Third party
Leader	Gaston Browne	Jamale Pringle	Trevor Walker
Party	ABLP	UPP	BPM
Leader's seat	St. John's City West	All Saints East & St. Luke	Barbuda
Last election	47.06%, 9 seats	45.22%, 6 seats	1.46%, 1 seat
Seats won	15	1	1
Seat change	▲6	▼5	Steady
Popular vote	23,818	14,614	616
Percentage	60.79%	37.30%	1.57%
Swing	▲13.73 pp	▼7.92 pp	▲0.11 pp
- Results by constituency
Prime Minister before election
Gaston Browne
ABLP
Subsequent Prime Minister
Gaston Browne
ABLP

General elections were held in Antigua and Barbuda on 30 April 2026 to elect members of the House of Representatives. The Antigua and Barbuda Labour Party (ABLP) had held a slim majority of seats since the 2023 election, making further gains in Parliament following the election of Rawdon Turner and the unofficial floor walk of Anthony Smith. However, it also experienced losses in the 2025 Barbuda Council election and the 2023 St. Mary's South by-election. Besides the ABLP, the United Progressive Party (UPP) and the Barbuda People's Movement (BPM), as well as various other independents and minor parties were expected to contest.

On 21 March, Prime Minister Gaston Browne had announced that general elections would be held within the next ninety days, and likely earlier. Parliament was dissolved on 1 April, and the date of the election was subsequently announced at the ABLP's platform launch on 7 April. Nomination day was on 13 April, and 1 May was a designated public holiday.

At 23:49 AST, the Antigua Broadcasting Service (ABS) projected that the ABLP would retain its majority in parliament following the victory of Daryll Matthew in St. John's Rural South, propelling Browne to his fourth term as prime minister.

== Background ==
=== Previous election ===
At the previous general election in January 2023, the Labour Party, led by Gaston Browne, continued to hold its majority in the House of Representatives albeit in a significantly narrower manner, largely due to discontent caused by the COVID-19 pandemic. An expelled member of the party, Asot Michael, managed to win a significant majority of the vote in Saint Peter on an independent ticket. Saint Peter had been a safe constituency for the party since its formation. Labour also lost several seats across Antigua to the United Progressive Party, especially in suburban regions in the Central Plain and rural areas near the Shekerley Mountains. Labour was unable to win the majority of the popular vote and relied on narrow support in some urban districts in the St. John's area, most notably in St. John's City East. Disputes from the sociopolitical crisis in Barbuda following Hurricane Irma also continued to influence the results in that constituency – Trevor Walker, leader of the Barbuda People's Movement, won nearly sixty percent of the votes on the island largely due to land and corruption issues.

Overall, Labour only carried one parish, Saint John, where the vast majority of the population resides, winning nine seats in total. The official opposition UPP won 6 seats, BPM won Barbuda, and independent Asot Michael retained his seat. UPP leader Harold Lovell resigned from the party leadership following the election, causing the eventual rise of deputy leader Jamale Pringle.

=== Senate ===
The composition of the Senate fluctuated during this term in parliament. The Senate was appointed on 23 January 2023, a few days following the election – the prime minister, leader of the opposition, and the Barbuda Council each must recommend that senators be appointed on their behalf. Some senators are also appointed under the governor-general's discretion. Eleven of the senators were members of the Labour Party – many of whom were appointed to the Senate after they lost their seats in the House of Representatives. All four general opposition senators appointed on behalf of Pringle were members of the United Progressive Party. The Barbuda Council nominated a member of the BPM to hold the Barbuda Council seat. An independent senator was nominated at the governor-general's discretion, initially Kiz Johnson.

Dozens of senators came and went, mostly senators from the Labour Party contesting in House by-elections such as Dwayne George and Rawdon Turner, and some others departed due to political infighting, especially within the UPP during the party's credibility crisis. Many senators who had left to contest by-elections were reappointed to the Senate following their losses. Unlike similar elections in the past, few senators on the government benches were granted ministerial portfolios – most ministers and other executive officials came from the House.

=== Events of the 16th legislature ===
Later in 2023, the Labour Party suffered a significant loss, losing in St. Mary's South by-election by a landslide. It also continued to fail to win a seat in the 2023 Barbuda Council election. The discontent with the Labour government lasted until July 2024, when UPP MP Anthony Smith left the party and was appointed to the Labour Party government the following day. This sparked a credibility crisis for the UPP, with internal dysfunction being revealed to the public and many calls for the party leadership to resign. Following the assassination of independent St. Peter MP Asot Michael in November 2024, the Labour Party was able to emerge victorious with about three-fourths of the vote. The Labour Party continued to fail to win a seat in the controversial 2025 Barbuda Council election, resulting in the BPM keeping to win all seats up for election. The Prime Minister stated that the country was ready for a general election in a rally on 23 March 2025, and in the council election's aftermath, informal campaigning commenced.

Due to repeated delays of the 2021 census until June 2025, the Constituency Boundaries Commission had originally proposed updating constituency boundaries based on voter registration counts. The constituency boundaries have not been changed since 1984, and constituency populations vary in the thousands. Review commenced in November 2025 although redistricting was not completed in time for the election. In February 2026, long-time representative Robin Yearwood resigned from parliament, triggering a by-election in a seat that had been solidly safe for the ABLP for nearly fifty years until a slim majority in the 2023 election. The ABLP candidate Randy Baltimore ended up winning in a landslide on 16 March 2026, although his swearing-in was delayed due to eligibility concerns. This victory caused various political scientists to recommend that Pringle resign from party leadership and Browne call for a general election, which Browne did on 21 March.

== Electoral system ==
As of March 2026, there are seventeen single-member constituencies in Antigua and Barbuda, with members of the House of Representatives being elected by first-past-the-post voting. There are sixteen constituencies on Antigua and one on Barbuda. In order to vote in Antigua and Barbuda, one must be an Antiguan and Barbudan citizen or the citizen of a Commonwealth country who is permanent resident in the country. One must also be aged eighteen or older and registered to vote with the Antigua and Barbuda Electoral Commission.

=== Political parties ===
Antigua and Barbuda has a three-party system, with the Labour Party active throughout the country, the UPP being active in Antigua, and the BPM being active in Barbuda. The UPP and BPM are allied, with alignment on most political issues and previously having a coalition government from 2004 to 2014. While formerly social democratic, since independence the ABLP has been a mostly conservative party. The table below lists political parties represented in the House of Representatives after the 2023 general election.

Name	Ideology	Political position	Leader	2023 result	
Name	Ideology	Political position	Leader	Votes (%)	Seats
Antigua and Barbuda Labour Party	Paternalistic conservatism Anti-federalism	Centre-right	Gaston Browne	47.06%	9 / 17
United Progressive Party	Social democracy	Centre-left	Jamale Pringle	45.22%	6 / 17
Barbuda People's Movement	Social democracy Barbudan nationalism Federalism	Centre-left to left-wing	Trevor Walker	1.46%	1 / 17

== Campaign ==
Informal campaigning began on 28 March 2025, about a year before the election. Browne began criticising the UPP due to its credibility crisis, while maintaining a more cooperative tone with the BPM due to its recent council election victory. The UPP promised to revamp the health, tourism, and education sectors. The opposition also criticised an increase in vehicle licensing fees and low quality public utilities.

A pre-campaign period took place in the aftermath of a by-election in St. Philip's North, where the ABLP planned a national convention scheduled on 12 April 2026, while the cabinet announced a national clean-up campaign to be carried out across the country within the next two weeks to address environmental concerns. The Electoral Commission also faced the task of getting more than 20,000 registered voters to replace their voter identification cards. Richard Lewis, a UPP MP from St. John's Rural West, would also make efforts to provide temporary relief to deteriorating road conditions in the Gray's Hill area on 20 March. In St. John's Rural South, UPP MP Emanuel Peters distributed 318 bowls of bullfoot soup to local residents as part of a pre-election outreach. The former UPP leader Harold Lovell on 21 March urged the UPP to intensify grassroots engagement, refine its public messaging, and strengthen its organisational structure.

On 22 March, the Electoral Commission would unveil a programme for the replacement of expired voter identification cards. On the same day, Browne declared that he was prepared to take further legal action against political opponents, referencing an ongoing lawsuit tied to claims surrounding the sale of the super-yacht Alfa Nero. Desmond Charles, a veteran member of the UPP, would resign from the party on 24 March, stating that his decision reflects a belief that the UPP's current direction no longer serves the best interests of Antigua and Barbuda. On 25 March, Richard Lewis spoke on Observer AM, urging voters to judge candidates based on record, while also stating that the UPP was handling internal tensions privately. Before the Parliament was prorogued on 27 March, Labour MPs walked out after UPP leader Jamale Pringle criticized the retiring Molwyn Joseph's tenure during parliamentary tributes. Pringle would later be removed from the sitting of parliament the same day after directly saying that he would not respect Osbert Frederick's authority as the Speaker of the House.

On 27 March 2026, the Democratic National Alliance announced they would not be contesting in the election. After an opinion poll published on 28 March highlighted the ABLP at 49% support compared to 26% for the UPP, Browne characterised the data as evidence of a significant directional shift in favor of ABLP. Browne then stated that UPP leader Jamale Pringle was at risk of losing his position as party leader, citing weak polling numbers and parliamentary conduct as potential triggers for intra-party tensions. Culture director Khan Cordice asked political candidates on 30 March to hire local artists in their campaigns instead of using artificial intelligence. On 1 April, ABLP senator Michael Freeland would outline a vision centered on infrastructural improvement and community development after he had conducted community outreach over the course of a year. On the same day, ABLP MP Maria Bird-Browne led a three-day bulk waste collection exercise across the constituency over the weekend. The cabinet called for the support of Browne's leadership on 3 April, reflecting on a period of economic growth.

Barbuda People's Movement leader Trevor Walker launched his campaign on 5 April, reaffirming his commitment to protecting Barbuda's rights, heritage and autonomy while urging residents to back the BPM at the polls. The UPP also issued a statement the same day, stating that the party emphasized its approach to governance in listening, engagement, and delivering tangible opportunities. ABLP candidate Kendra Beazer launched his campaign in Barbuda on 6 April, placing priorities on community-centered growth and expanding youth opportunities.

The official campaign period would begin after the date of the election was revealed on 7 April, having been set for 30 April. The ABLP branded their campaign as a "renaissance", centering their platform on the continued investment and expansion on healthcare, education, housing, and tourism. UPP leader Pringle stated on 9 April that he faced intense internal pressure during the party's candidate selection process, describing the situation as having a "gun to his head", while also referencing the defection of Philmore Benjamin to the ABLP and his running in the St. Mary's North constituency. The Antigua and Barbuda National Congress, a smaller party led by Gero Pero-Weston, stated on 9 April that it would not field candidates for the election. On 12 April, Browne would be re-elected unopposed as the political leader of the ABLP. The same day, Pringle would launch the UPP campaign, unveiling a five-pillar policy platform centered on food costs, roads, vehicle duties, water and healthcare.

The ABLP accused the UPP of forging a letter purportedly made by senator Shenella Govia in an attempt to mislead voters on 13 April. On the same day, BPM leader Trevor Walker pledged to improve healthcare access in Barbuda by securing a dialysis machine for residents. An ABLP press release published on 15 April asked the UPP to deliver a public apology to Robin Yearwood and his family after the UPP's website, reportedly built and populated using AI tools, had falsely reported the death of Yearwood. On 17 April, the ABLP also accused the UPP of creating a brightly coloured graphic showing ABLP leader Gaston Browne and Kendra Beazer, the ABLP candidate in Barbuda, kissing. Two days after, Browne responded by framing the image as an opportunity to speak to his broader stance on non-discrimination and inclusivity.

The UPP would withdraw its remaining candidates from the ABS programme Know Your Candidates, citing concerns over alleged bias in the show's format and presentation. The ABLP manifesto also launched on 20 April, proposing a $1.5 billion tourism investment pipeline and an expanded housing and health programme. A WIC News online survey also conducted the same day highlighted a strong support for the ABLP, revealing that the party had leads across all 17 constituencies.

On 24 April 2026, Browne criticised the UPP over an AI image of a proposed sports complex, describing it as a "fairy tale" concept lacking any serious consideration of cost or feasibility. The ABLP also accused the UPP of fabricating another letter relating to an entity identifying itself as the Caribbean Anticorruption Association, stating that there was no institutional record of the entity ever existing. The ABLP then criticised the UPP the same day for not releasing a manifesto ahead of the election. The UPP released their manifesto on 25 April, pledging to create a dedicated Diaspora Affairs portfolio within the office of the Prime Minister, five annual business grants of 20,000 dollars, and a youth land distribution programme. Foreign Affairs minister Paul Chet Greene criticised the UPP manifesto, stating that there were no framework, no explanation of finances, and no explanation of costs. The UPP responded by criticising the ABLP's campaign spending, raising that the ABLP had not translated financial resources into the daily lives of Antiguans and Barbudans, suggesting that the ABLP was more focused on retaining power than delivering public services.

In the final days of the campaign, the ABLP would host their Red and Reddy Concert on 26 April. The next day, the ABLP would report massive turnout in their 'megacade', a large motorcade stretched across key roadways across the island of Antigua. On 28 April, DNA leader Joanne Massiah endorsed ABLP candidate Lamin Newton in All Saints East and St. Luke. A final UPP rally was conducted on 29 April in All Saints, where Pringle stated that the UPP was ready to lead the people from day one. The campaign period ended on 30 April, with workers being observed dismantling party signage in the last 30 minutes before polls closed.

=== Conduct ===
On 23 April, the OAS stated their intention to deploy a team of 17 experts and observers drawn from 11 countries to oversee electoral organisation, electoral technology, electoral justice, political-electoral finance, and the political participation of women. On 25 April, election observers arrived from CARICOM, intending to gather data to support verification of results while also evaluating the conduct of electoral officials and political actors. 190 polling stations across Antigua and Barbuda were open from 6:00 am AST to 6:00 pm AST.

The Commonwealth deployed a Commonwealth Observer Group (COG) to observe the election, led by Pelonomi Venson-Moitoi, former Minister of Foreign Affairs of Botswana. The Preliminary Statement issued by the COG commended the people of Antigua and Barbuda for their continued commitment to democratic values, and encouraged relevant authorities, political parties, and stakeholders to consider measures to improve the regulation and transparency of campaign financing.

== Candidates ==
The UPP revealed a partial list of candidates on 1 January 2026, while the ABLP revealed their candidate list on 23 March. The UPP ratified their list on candidates on 7 April, while the ABLP ratified their list of candidates on 12 April. The Electoral Commission revealed on 14 April 2026 that 37 candidates were nominated for the election, consisting of 17 ABLP candidates, 16 UPP candidates, three independent candidates, and one BPM candidate.

#	Constituency	ABLP	UPP	BPM	Independents
1	St. John's City West	Gaston Browne	Alister Thomas	–	–
2	St. John's City East	Melford Nicholas	Pearl Quinn-Williams	–	–
3	St. John's City South	Steadroy Benjamin	Adrian Williams	–	–
4	St. John's Rural West	Michael Joseph	Richard Lewis	–	Nigel Bascus
5	St. John's Rural South	Daryll Mathew	Emanuel Peters	–	–
6	St. John's Rural East	Maria Browne	Ashworth Azille	–	–
7	St. John's Rural North	Charles Fernandez	Malaka Parker	–	–
8	St. Mary's North	Philmore Benjamin	Jonathan Joseph	–	–
9	St. Mary's South	Dwayne George	Kelvin Simon	–	–
10	All Saints East and St. Luke	Lamin Newton	Jamale Pringle	–	–
11	All Saints West	Anthony Smith Jr.	Harold Lovell	–	–
12	St. George	Michael Freeland	Kelton Dalso	–	Gail Pero-Weston
13	St. Peter	Rawdon Turner	George Wehner	–	–
14	St. Phillip North	Randy Baltimore	Alex Browne	–	–
15	St. Phillip South	Kiz Nathaniel-Johnson	Sherfield Bowen	–	–
16	St. Paul	Chet Greene	Franz deFreitas	–	Alan Weston
17	Barbuda	Kendra Beazer	–	Trevor Walker	
Source: Electoral Commission

== Results ==
Results were largely similar to the 2018 election, with Gaston Browne securing a fourth term after the governing Antigua and Barbuda Labour Party won 15 seats, an increase of six seats from the previous election. The United Progressive Party leader Jamale Pringle narrowly retained his seat in All Saints East & St. Luke, while Barbuda People's Movement leader Trevor Walker won re-election in the constituency of Barbuda. The ABLP secured strong leads across constituencies in Antigua, the UPP faced challenges in converting support into seats with limited breakthroughs, while independent candidates failed to make a significant electoral impact. 63,313 voters were in the electorate, and the Electoral Commission reported that the turnout of the election was 62.41%.

Party	Votes	%	Seats	+/–
Antigua and Barbuda Labour Party	23,818	60.79	15	+6
United Progressive Party	14,614	37.30	1	–5
Barbuda People's Movement	616	1.57	1	0
Independents	135	0.34	0	–1
Total	39,183	100.00	17	0
Valid votes	39,183	99.16		
Invalid/blank votes	332	0.84		
Total votes	39,515	100.00		
Registered voters/turnout	63,313	62.41		
Source: Electoral Commission

=== By constituency ===
Constituency	ABLP		UPP		BPM		Ind		Total
Constituency	Votes	%	Votes	%	Votes	%	Votes	%	Total
All Saints East & St. Luke	1,239	46.90	1,403	53.10	–	–	–	–	2,642
All Saints West	1,945	55.48	1,561	44.52	–	–	–	–	3,506
Barbuda	391	38.83	–	–	616	61.17	–	–	1,007
St. George	2,198	60.80	1,359	37.59	–	–	58	1.61	3,615
St. John's City East	863	64.89	467	35.11	–	–	–	–	1,330
St. John's City South	887	71.71	350	28.29	–	–	–	–	1,237
St. John's City West	1,444	77.80	412	22.20	–	–	–	–	1,856
St. John's Rural East	2,127	68.15	994	31.85	–	–	–	–	3,121
St. John's Rural North	1,592	60.14	1,055	39.86	–	–	–	–	2,647
St. John's Rural South	1,457	60.71	943	39.29	–	–	–	–	2,400
St. John's Rural West	1,996	57.59	1,466	42.30	–	–	4	0.11	3,466
St. Mary's North	1,741	57.90	1,266	42.10	–	–	–	–	3,007
St. Mary's South	1,002	52.11	921	47.89	–	–	–	–	1,923
St. Paul	1,328	60.31	801	36.38	–	–	73	3.32	2,202
St. Peter	2,054	72.20	791	27.80	–	–	–	–	2,845
St. Philip North	1,061	73.58	381	26.42	–	–	–	–	1,442
St. Philip South	493	52.61	444	47.39	–	–	–	–	937
Total	23,818	60.79	14,614	37.30	616	1.57	135	0.34	39,183
Source: Electoral Commission

== Aftermath ==
Following the victory of the ABLP, the incumbent Prime Minister Gaston Browne thanked his supporters for their continued trust, framing the result as a mandate to continue developing the country, while additional focus on productivity, national unity, and development. Browne was sworn in for his fourth term in office at 10:00 AST the following day on 1 May 2026 inside Government House. Attorney general Steadroy Benjamin was sworn in for another term. Browne expressed hope that the election results would usher in a more respectful political environment, while also further emphasizing accountability within his administration. U.S. Secretary of State Marco Rubio congratulated Browne and reaffirmed their commitment to work with Antigua and Barbuda in the matters of regional security and law enforcement. UPP leader Jamale Pringle conceded defeat and emphasized his gratitude to supporters, pledging to build on his previous work and deliver for Antiguans. Regional pollster Peter Wickham also raised doubts about Pringle's continued leadership of the UPP, warning that the circumstances of the election may fuel internal tensions within the party.

After BPM leader Trevor Walker retained his seat in the largest margin of victory on the island of Barbuda, he stated that the issue of land remained as the BPM's main platform and called for his Labour opponent Kendra Beazer to cut ties with the ABLP. While Beazer was slightly disappointed in the results on Barbuda, he stated that he felt content in the fact that he ran a decent campaign, expressing his willingness to remain active in politics.

Governor-General Rodney Williams disclosed that the oath administered on 1 May was incorrect since the Oaths Act that passed in 2025 had taken effect after 1 January 2026. As a result, both Browne and attorney-general Benjamin had to be sworn in a second time on 2 May. The rest of Browne's fourth cabinet was sworn in on 5 May 2026. During the swearing-in ceremony, the death of Cheryl Mary Clare Hurst, the former ABLP general secretary who was succeeded by Shenella Govia in April 2026, was announced by Browne.

== See also ==
- Politics of Antigua and Barbuda
- Local government in Antigua and Barbuda
