= Charlesworth Samuel =

Antiguan politician

Hon. Charlesworth Theophilus Samuel

Minister of Agriculture of Antigua and Barbuda
- In office 2004–2008

Member of the Parliament of Antigua and Barbuda for All Saints East and St. Luke
- In office 1976–84, 1994–2008

Personal details
- Born: Swetes, Antigua and Barbuda
- Died: January 2008
- Party: United Progressive Party
- Other political affiliations: Progressive Labour Movement
- Education: University of the West Indies
- Profession: Teacher, Lawyer

Charlesworth Theophilus Samuel (died January 2008) was an Antiguan politician.

== Early life ==
Born in Swetes, Antigua, Samuel attended the All Saint’s Government School. After graduating he worked as a surveyor trainee for the Public Works Department. He began teaching in 1957 at the Swetes Government School and, in 1964, was appointed headmaster at the John Hughes Primary School and also Jennings Secondary School . He married on 20 December 1962.

In 1972, he received a Bachelor's degree in physics from the University of the West Indies. He became president of the Antigua and Barbuda Union of Teachers in 1974 and served in that capacity until 1976.

He later worked as an underwriter for the Life of Barbados Insurance Company. After graduating from the Holborn Law School in England with a LLB and training at the Hugh Wooding Law School in Trinidad, Samuel established a legal practice. He was also a president of the Antigua Chapter of Gideons International.

== Political career ==
Samuel was elected to the House of Representatives for the Progressive Labour Movement in the 1976 general election, and was reelected in 1980. After losing his seat in the 1984 election, he became the opposition leader in the Senate. He was victorious in the 1994 general election and represented the All Saints East and St. Luke constituency for the United Progressive Party, becoming Minister of Agriculture following the 2004 election, from then until his death. He had announced prior to his death that he would not contest the next election.

At the time of his death, Samuel was one of only two sitting Members of Parliament (the other being Robin Yearwood) who were present at the first session of the Parliament of Antigua and Barbuda in 1981. He was also a member of the independence delegation that visited London in December 1980 to discuss Antigua and Barbuda's constitution.

== Death ==
Samuel was reported missing by his family on 30 January 2008, having left home the previous day and failed to return. His body was found on the morning of 31 January on Shell Beach, near St. John's, by a civilian search party. Authorities have not offered a cause of death and are investigating. He was survived by his wife, five children, and ten grandchildren.

In response to Samuel's death, Prime Minister Baldwin Spencer ordered national flags to be displayed at half-staff and announced an "official period of mourning" starting on 1 February. A state funeral will be held at the Antigua Recreation Ground.

According to Gaston Browne, chairman of the Antigua Labour Party, Samuel "was one of the Members of Parliament who enjoyed the full respect from both sides of the political aisle". Leon Chaku Symister, chairman of the governing United Progressive Party, noted: "Mr Samuel has been a very active member of our party. He was a person who participated quite often and his experience and knowledge was quite an asset to the party."
