= David Massiah =

Antigua and Barbuda politician

Member of the Senate of Antigua and Barbuda
- Incumbent
- Assumed office 23 January 2023; Opposition senator

Personal details
- Party: United Progressive Party

Dane Alexis Conroy David Massiah is a United Progressive Party politician, who was appointed to the Senate of Antigua and Barbuda for the opposition on 23 January 2023.

== Early life and education ==
Massiah is born on August 27, 1963, in Antigua. Raises in All Saints Village and studies at All Saints Primary School and the Grammar School. Attends the University of the West Indies (UWI) Mona Campus, taking Labour and Economics courses. Afterwards, follows Business and Development at UWI St. Augustine, then Labour Relations at Ruskin College in the United Kingdom.

== Professional career ==
Works three years at the Antigua and Barbuda Broadcasting Station. Successively, joins the Antigua and Barbuda Workers Union and becomes General Secretary. In his capacity as a union leader, fights for the rights of former LIAT and Jolly Beach Hotel employees. Serves as Chair of the Tourism Section of the International Transport Workers Federation and as President of the Caribbean Congress of Labour from 2010 to 2016.

== Political career ==
Since 2004, serving as a UPP Senator and representing the labor force.

== Personal life ==
Married with three children.

== See also ==
- Alex Browne
- Jacqui Quinn-Leandro
