= Chester Hughes =

Antiguan politician

Chester Hughes MP

Member of the House of Representatives of Antigua and Barbuda
- In office 12 March 2009 – 26 April 2014
- Preceded by: Charlesworth Samuel
- Succeeded by: Joanne Massiah
- Constituency: All Saints East & St. Luke

Member of the Senate of Antigua and Barbuda
- Incumbent
- Assumed office 11 May 2026; Opposition senator

Personal details
- Party: United Progressive Party

Chester Hughes is an Antiguan United Progressive Party politician, who was elected as Member of Parliament for All Saints East & St. Luke in the 2009 general election. He was appointed to the Senate of Antigua and Barbuda for the opposition on 11 May 2026.
