= Samantha Marshall =

Antiguan politician

The Honourable Samantha Marshall

Member of the House of Representatives of Antigua and Barbuda
- In office 12 June 2014 – 16 December 2022
- Monarchs: Elizabeth II; Charles III
- Governors General: Louise Lake-Tack, Rodney Williams
- Constituency: St. Mary's South

Member of the Senate of Antigua and Barbuda
- In office 23 January 2023 – 12 November 2024
- Succeeded by: Michael Joseph

Personal details
- Party: Antigua and Barbuda Labour Party

Samantha Nicole Marshall is an Antiguan MP and Cabinet Minister. Marshall had once represented St. Mary's South in the House of Representatives. She is a member of the Antigua and Barbuda Labour Party. Her father is Hugh Marshall, a former representative of the constituency.

== Career ==
Marshall is the owner of the St. John's-based legal practice Stapleton Chambers. She is among the top lawyers in the country.

Marshall won the St. Mary's South constituency in the 2014 general elections defeating Hilson Baptiste, a member of the United Progressive Party. Six days after the 2014 elections, she was appointed Minister of Social Transformation and Human Resource Development by Prime Minister Gaston Browne.

She won the same seat in the 2018 elections and was appointed Minister of Social Transformation, Human Resource, Youth, and Gender Affairs Department one day after the 2018 elections.

She became a senator on 23 January 2023, after losing her seat in the 2023 Antiguan general election. Marshall resigned from the Senate on 12 November 2024.
