= 2023 St. Mary's South by-election =

- October 24, 2023
Candidate	Kelvin Simon	Dwayne George	Andrew Antonio
Party	UPP	ABLP	DNA
Popular vote	1,065	891	8
Percentage	54.23%	45.37%	0.41%

On October 24, 2023, a by-election was conducted in the Antiguan seat of St. Mary's South in response to the resignation of Kelvin Simon, the sitting UPP member of parliament, due to challenges to his candidacy. It was Antigua and Barbuda's second election since Prime Minister Gaston Browne emerged victorious in the country's general election in 2023 with a narrow win.

The election was won by the UPP. This was the first by-election held outside of Barbuda since independence in 1981.

== Background ==
After the Labour Party contested the results of the 2023 Antiguan general election in St. Mary's South, Kelvin Simon MP resigned from the seat to trigger a by-election. This was due to concerns of Simon being unduly nominated. On 27 July 2023, the Labour Party candidate, Samantha Marshall, withdrew from the by-election, and future senator Dwayne George was chosen as her replacement instead. It was expected that the by-election would generate significant interest across the Caribbean region.

The election date was announced on 30 September 2023 in Urlings, the date being 24 October 2023. The writ of by-election was given by Governor-General Rodney Williams on 2 October 2023.

== Candidates ==
Candidate name	Political party	Candidate village	Reference
Andrew Antonio	DNA	Bolans	
Dwayne George	ABLP	Bolans	
Kelvin Simon	UPP	Bolans	

== Polling divisions ==
Polling division	Primary villages
"A"	Bolans (incl. Jolly Harbour)
"B"	Crabs Hill and Johnsons Point
"C"	Urlings

== Results ==
Candidate	Party	Votes	%
Kelvin Simon	UPP	1,065	54.23
Dwayne George	ABLP	891	45.37
Andrew Antonio	DNA	8	0.41
Total		1,964	100.00
Valid votes		1,964	99.75
Invalid/blank votes		5	0.25
Total votes		1,969	100.00
Registered voters/turnout		2,717	72.47
Majority		174	8.86
UPP hold			
Source: Loop News
