= Jamale Pringle =

Antigua and Barbuda politician

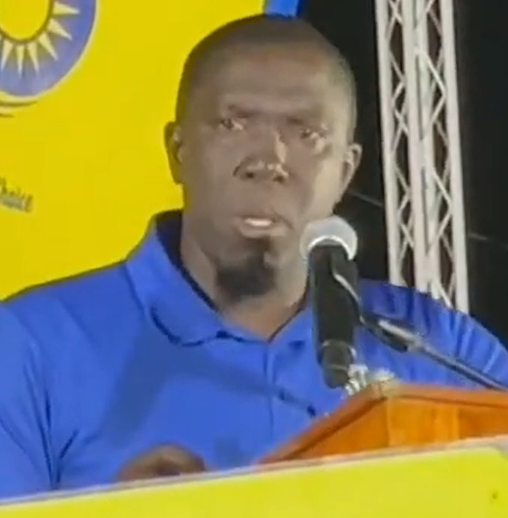
- Pringle in 2022

Leader of the United Progressive Party
- Incumbent
- Assumed office 24 January 2023
- Preceded by: Harold Lovell

Member of Parliament for All Saints East & St. Luke
- Incumbent
- Assumed office 26 March 2018
- Preceded by: Joanne Massiah

Leader of the Opposition of Antigua and Barbuda
- Incumbent
- Assumed office 25 March 2018
- Preceded by: Baldwin Spencer

Personal details
- Born: Jamale Lars Pringle All Saints, Antigua and Barbuda
- Party: UPP

Jamale Lars Pringle is an Antiguan educator, entrepreneur, and politician who has served as Leader of the Opposition in the Parliament of Antigua and Barbuda since 2018. He has been the political leader of the United Progressive Party since 2023. He is a member of the House of Representatives, representing the constituency of All Saints East & St. Luke, a district to which he was first elected in 2018 and re-elected in 2023.

== Biography ==
Born in All Saints, Pringle completed his secondary education at All Saints Secondary School and his tertiary studies at the Department of Teacher Education at Antigua State College. Pringle taught for many years at numerous secondary schools in Antigua. He left the teaching profession to enter the private sector, becoming a business partner in an event management firm.

A member of the United Progressive Party (UPP), Pringle ran as a candidate for the All Saints East & St. Luke seat—his home constituency and a party stronghold— in the 2018 general election, following the expulsion of incumbent MP Joanne Massiah amidst a dispute with UPP leader Harold Lovell. The election proved to be a resounding national defeat for the UPP, which garnered only 37.09% of the vote and suffered its worst-ever result against the Antigua and Barbuda Labour Party (ABLP). Against this backdrop, Pringle prevailed by a narrow margin of just 10 votes over Osbert Frederick (of the ABLP) and was the only UPP candidate to be elected; meanwhile, the ABLP won the other fifteen seats in Antigua, while the Barbuda People's Movement—an ally of the UPP—won the single seat in Barbuda. The tight margin—and the fact that the total number of rejected ballots (12) exceeded Pringle's lead—prompted Frederick to demand a recount, which ultimately confirmed the UPP's victory. Since Lovell (the party leader) had failed to secure a seat in Parliament, and in the absence of any other UPP parliamentarians, Pringle was sworn in as Leader of the Opposition on 25 March, succeeding former Prime Minister Baldwin Spencer. Trevor Walker declined to challenge him for the position.

From his parliamentary seat, Pringle led the opposition against Gaston Browne's Labour government with an agenda focused on youth and business development. His status as the sole opposition member in Antigua—a situation unprecedented since the founding of the UPP—led to him being nicknamed "Single Pringle." Pringle rose through the ranks of the UPP and was appointed the party's Deputy Political Leader and Lovell's direct successor at the subsequent Biennial Convention. Ahead of the 2023 elections, Pringle was once again nominated as a candidate for re-election; he secured a landslide victory with 62.08% of the vote—the party's strongest performance of the day. Although the UPP staged a notable recovery, securing 45.22% of the vote and six seats, it once again lost the election; furthermore, Lovell failed for the third time to return to Parliament, prompting his resignation as party leader. Consequently, Pringle was re-elected as Leader of the Opposition in Parliament and, simultaneously, assumed formal leadership of the UPP.

== See also ==
- 16th Parliament of Antigua and Barbuda
