= Pearl Quinn-Williams =

Antigua and Barbuda politician

Member of the Senate of Antigua and Barbuda
- Incumbent
- Assumed office 25 November 2024; Opposition senator
- Preceded by: Shawn Nicholas

Personal details
- Party: United Progressive Party

Pearl Quinn-Williams is a United Progressive Party politician, who was sworn into the Senate of Antigua and Barbuda for the opposition on 25 November 2024. She is the sister of Jacqui Quinn-Leandro, the first woman elected to the Parliament of Antigua and Barbuda.
