= Damani Tabor =

Antiguan politician

Member of the Senate of Antigua and Barbuda
- In office 12 August 2014 – 16 December 2022; Opposition senator
- Preceded by: Harold Lovell

Personal details
- Party: United Progressive Party (former)

Damani Tabor is a former United Progressive Party politician, who was appointed to the Senate of Antigua and Barbuda for the opposition on 12 August 2014, and reappointed on 26 March 2018.
