= Alex Browne (politician) =

Antigua and Barbuda politician

Member of the Senate of Antigua and Barbuda
- In office 31 March 2026 – 1 April 2026; Opposition senator
- In office 23 January 2023 – 18 February 2026; Opposition senator

Personal details
- Party: United Progressive Party

Alex Browne is a United Progressive Party politician, who was appointed to the Senate of Antigua and Barbuda for the opposition on 23 January 2023. He left his seat on 18 February 2026 to contest in the 2026 St. Philip's North by-election. After losing this election, he returned to Parliament on 31 March 2026 before parliament was dissolved for the 2026 Antiguan general election the next day. He was not reappointed.
