= Maria Bird-Browne =

Member of the Parliament of Antigua and Barbuda

Maria Vanessa Bird-Browne
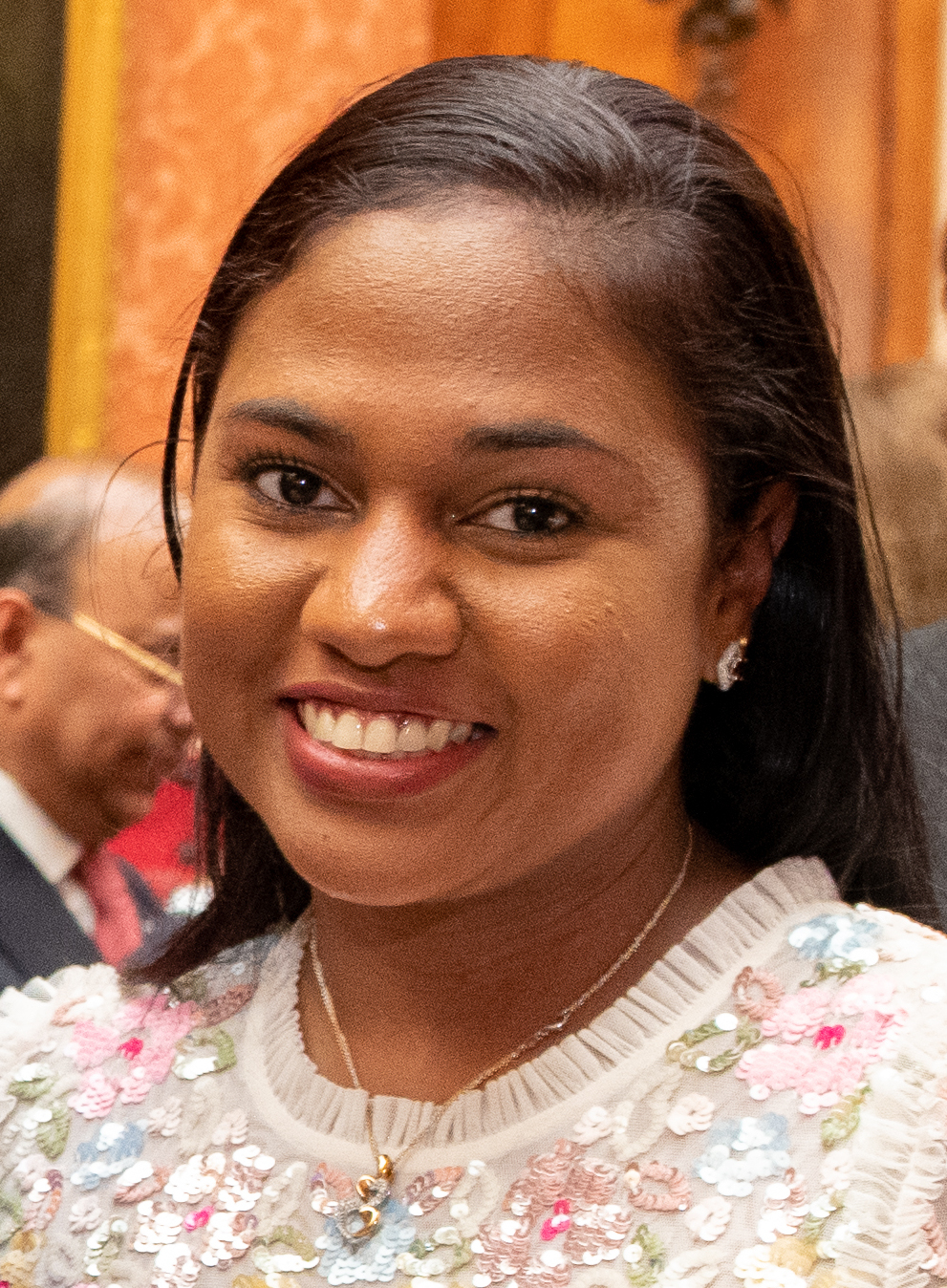

Member of the Antigua and Barbuda Parliament for St. John's Rural East
- Incumbent
- Assumed office March 2018
- Monarchs: Elizabeth II; Charles III
- Governor General: Rodney Williams
- Preceded by: Lester Bird

Personal details
- Born: 1991 (age 34–35)
- Party: Labour
- Spouse: Gaston Browne (m. 2013)
- Children: 2
- Relatives: Vere Bird (grandfather); Lester Bird (uncle)
- Education: University of Phoenix; Arden University

Maria Vanessa Bird-Browne (born 1991) is a politician in Antigua and Barbuda. She was elected as a member of the House of Representatives for St. John's Rural East in the Parliament of Antigua and Barbuda in 2018, becoming the youngest lawmaker in the country. She is the country's minister for housing, lands, and urban renewal.

Bird-Browne's grandfather and uncle were the first and second prime ministers of Antigua and Barbuda, respectively. She is married to Gaston Browne, the current prime minister who assumed office in 2014.

== Early life and education ==
Maria Bird was born in 1991. Her paternal grandfather, Vere Bird, was Antigua and Barbuda's first prime minister from 1981 to 1994 and is considered the father of the nation. Her parents are Purcell and Xandra Bird, and her uncle is Lester Bird, who served as prime minister of Antigua and Barbuda from 1994 to 2004. Her father Purcell Bird is founder of Murbee Resorts Inc, a company involved in luxury real estate development on the island of Barbuda.

Bird-Browne graduated with a bachelor's degree in psychology from the University of Phoenix. She later received a bachelor of laws in 2019 from Arden University.

== Political career ==
In the 2018 Antiguan general election, Bird-Browne ran as a candidate for the Antigua and Barbuda Labour Party for the St. John's Rural East seat, which was previously held by her uncle Lester Bird. The former prime minister endorsed her as his successor. She won, becoming the youngest member of the Parliament of Antigua and Barbuda at age 26. She was also the youngest female lawmaker in the Commonwealth at that time.

After taking office in March 2018, Bird-Browne was appointed as minister for housing, lands, and urban renewal, as well as junior minister in the Ministry of Legal Affairs, Public Safety, and Labor. She has focused on housing and infrastructure on the islands during her term.

In the 2023 Antiguan general election, Bird-Browne was re-elected to the St. John's Rural East seat, collecting 1,770 votes (UPP candidate Sean Bird, Bird-Browne's cousin, collected 1,460 votes; DNA candidate Trevor Young won 48). Bird-Browne was also confirmed as minister for housing, works, lands, and urban renewal. She was subsequently re-elected in 2026, defeating UPP challenger Ashworth Azille.

She is married to the current prime minister of Antigua and Barbuda, Gaston Browne. The couple wed in 2013, the year after Browne had defeated her uncle to take control of the Antigua and Barbuda Labour Party. When Bird-Browne took office in 2018, it marked the first time a husband-and-wife pair served together in Parliament.

== Controversies ==
Bird-Browne previously operated a charity, Share Inc., which was shut down in 2017 amid criticism of the government's dealings with the organization during her husband's first term as prime minister. He had announced that Share Inc. would partner with the government to finance a government-run venture capital fund at the Antigua and Barbuda Development Bank.

When her candidacy for the 2018 election was announced in late 2017, critics charged that she was primarily chosen for the race because of her position both in the Bird dynasty and as the prime minister's wife. There was speculation that other candidates vying for the nomination were pressured to step back after Bird-Browne expressed interest in the seat. The Labour Party, however, denied that the prime minister was involved in selecting the candidate for her constituency and said that she was selected based on a poll that the party had commissioned.

== Personal life ==
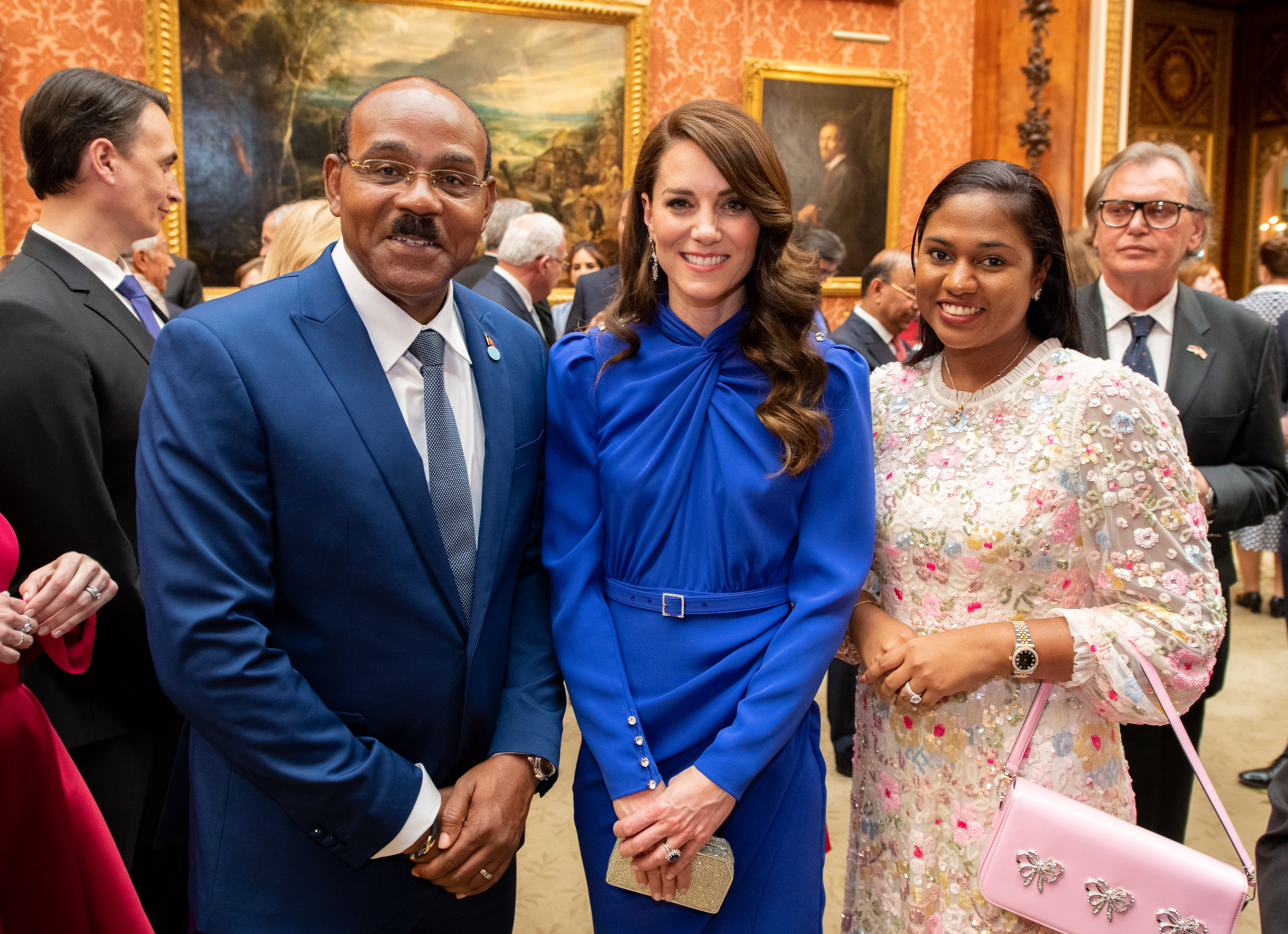
Maria Bird-Browne and her husband with Catherine, Princess of Wales at Buckingham Palace, May 2023

Maria Bird-Browne and her husband, Prime Minister Gaston Browne, have two children: a son, Prince Gaston Browne, and a daughter, Peace-Marie Xandra Browne. Gaston Browne has three other children from before the couple were married.
