= Kiz Johnson =

Antigua and Barbuda politician

Member of the House of Representatives of Antigua and Barbuda
- Incumbent
- Assumed office 30 April 2026
- Preceded by: Sherfield Bowen
- Constituency: St. Philip's South

Member of the Senate of Antigua and Barbuda
- In office 5 December 2025 – 1 April 2026; Government senator
- Governor-General: Rodney Williams
- Preceded by: Clement Antonio
- In office 23 January 2023 – 24 October 2025; Governor-General's senator
- Preceded by: Bakesha Francis-James
- Succeeded by: Jamilla Kirwan

Personal details
- Party: Antigua and Barbuda Labour Party; Independent (former)

Kiz Johnson is an Antigua and Barbuda Labour Party politician, who was appointed to the Senate of Antigua and Barbuda at the Governor-General's discretion on 23 January 2023. She was an independent senator. Johnson resigned on 24 October 2025, and was reappointed on 5 December 2025 following a successful primary win, replacing Clement Antonio. She was the Labour Party caretaker for St. Philip's South and she was appointed as a government senator the next day.

She was elected to the House of Representatives in 2026.
