= Maureen Payne-Hyman =

Antiguan government senator

Maureen Colette Payne-Hyman
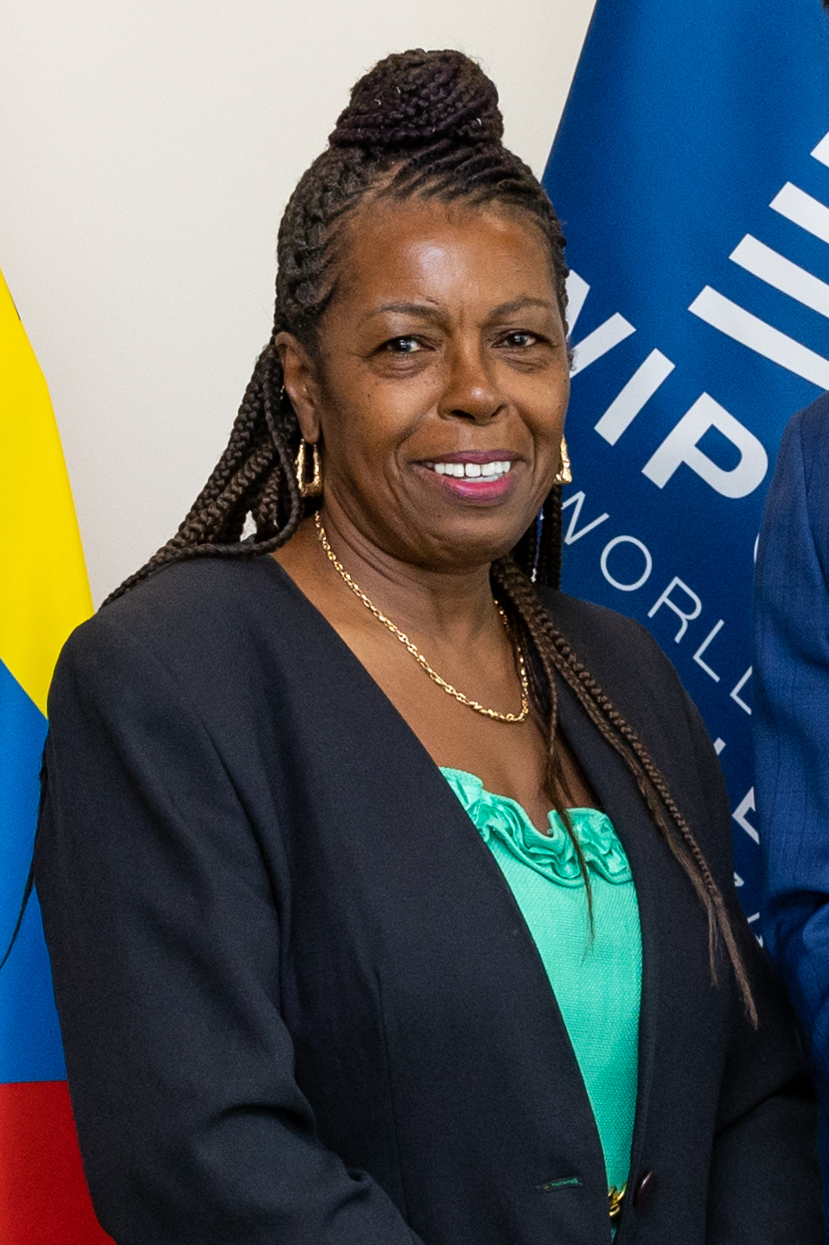

Member of the Senate of Antigua and Barbuda
- In office 24 June 2014 – 16 December 2022; Government senator

Personal details
- Party: Antigua and Barbuda Labour Party

Maureen Colette Payne-Hyman is an Antigua and Barbuda Labour Party politician, who served in the Senate of Antigua and Barbuda for the government from 24 June 2014 until 16 December 2022.
