= Shawn Nicholas =

Antiguan politician

Senate Minority Leader
- In office 23 January 2023 – 19 November 2024
- Preceded by: Richard Lewis

Member of the Senate of Antigua and Barbuda
- In office 25 June 2014 – 19 November 2024; Opposition senator
- Succeeded by: Pearl Quinn-Williams

Personal details
- Party: United Progressive Party

Shawn Nicholas is a United Progressive Party politician, who was appointed to the Senate of Antigua and Barbuda as minority leader on 23 January 2023.
