= Clement Antonio =

Antiguan politician

Clement Marley Mandela Antonio

Member of the Senate of Antigua and Barbuda
- In office 23 January 2023 – 5 December 2025; Government senator
- Succeeded by: Kiz Johnson

Personal details
- Party: Antigua and Barbuda Labour Party

Clement Marley Mandela Antonio is an Antigua and Barbuda Labour Party politician, who was appointed to the Senate of Antigua and Barbuda for the government on 23 January 2023. He resigned on 5 December 2025, being replaced by Kiz Johnson.
