= Michael Freeland =

Antiguan politician

Member of the House of Representatives of Antigua and Barbuda
- Incumbent
- Assumed office 30 April 2026
- Preceded by: Algernon Watts
- Constituency: St. George

Member of the Senate of Antigua and Barbuda
- In office 21 March 2025 – 1 April 2026; Government senator
- Preceded by: Rawdon Turner

Personal details
- Party: Antigua and Barbuda Labour Party

Michael Freeland is an Antigua and Barbuda Labour Party politician, who was appointed to the Senate of Antigua and Barbuda for the government on 21 March 2025. Freeland previously served in the Senate from 2014 until 2017. He was elected to the House of Representatives in 2026.
