= Daryll Matthew =

Antiguan and Barbudan politician

The Honourable Daryll Sylvester Matthew
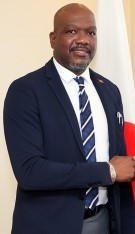

Member of the Antigua and Barbuda Parliament for St. John’s Rural South
- Incumbent
- Assumed office March 2018
- Monarch: Elizabeth II
- Governor General: Rodney Williams

Personal details
- Born: 11 September 1976 (age 49)
- Party: Antigua and Barbuda Labour Party

Daryll Sylvester Matthew is an Antiguan and Barbudan politician, representing St. John's Rural South in the Antigua and Barbuda House of Representatives.

== Early life and education ==
Matthew has an MBA from Aston University in the UK with a focus on international business and a thesis on foreign direct investment, as well as a master's degree in geo-information management from Twente University in Enschede, the Netherlands.

== Political career ==
On January 9, 2018, Matthew was appointed to the Antigua and Barbuda Senate. In March 2018, he was elected as the Legislative Representative of the St. John's Rural South on the platform of the ABLP. On March 22, 2018, he was appointed Minister of Sports, Culture, National Festivals, and the Arts.

Administration, Project Management, Business Development, and Community Service were important aspects of Daryll Matthew's life both personally and professionally before he entered national politics in Antigua and Barbuda.

His areas of study match his profession as a person who is highly technical oriented but has a passion for business (Land Surveying at the University of Technology, Jamaica; Geographic Information Management, and Business Administration, specializing in International Business and Foreign Direct Investment).

Matthew has quickly advanced his career within Antigua and Barbuda's public service. He started working for the Antigua and Barbuda Surveys Division in 1998. By 2002, he had advanced to the position of Senior Environment Officer, and in 2004 he was named Chief Lands Officer. His native Antigua and Barbuda has been represented by him in numerous international platforms throughout his time in the public service. They include: Hong Kong, China, India, The People's Republic of China, The Philippines, Colombia, Mexico, Australia, Kenya, The United States, and Hong Kong.

He was elected again to the House of Representatives in the 2023 general elections for the St. John's Rural South Constituency and confirmed as Minister of Education, Sports, & Creative Industries in the Government of the Prime Minister Gaston Browne.

== Honours and awards ==
In 2012, Matthew was awarded the National Youth Award for Entrepreneurship, from the Government of Antigua and Barbuda.

== Personal life ==
Over the years, Minister Matthew has been involved in his nation and neighborhood in a number of capacities, including volunteer work and sports development.

Matthew has held roles in:

- Chief Executive Officer of the Golden Eagles Sports Club
- Jamaica's Antigua and Barbuda Students Association president
- Member of the Kingston, Jamaica, Rotaract Club
- member of the Antigua Rotaract Club
- President of the Antigua Rotaract Club
- a member of the Antigua Rotary Club
- Member of the Rotary Club of Antigua's Board of Directors
- member of the Antigua Commercial Bank's board of directors
- Executive Member of the National Olympic Committee and President of the Antigua and Barbuda Basketball Association
- Founder and former Director of Myst Carnival Treasurer of the Caribbean Basketball Confederation Vice President of Finance and Marketing of the CBC Member of the CBA Finance Committee

== See also ==
- E.P. Chet Greene
- Steadroy Benjamin
