= Tiffany Strann-Peters =

Antiguan politician

Member of the Senate of Antigua and Barbuda
- Incumbent
- Assumed office 14 May 2026; Government senator

Personal details
- Party: Antigua and Barbuda Labour Party

Tiffany Strann-Peters is an Antigua and Barbuda Labour Party politician, who was appointed to the Senate of Antigua and Barbuda for the government on 14 May 2026.
