= Ashworth Azille =

Antiguan politician

Member of the Senate of Antigua and Barbuda
- Incumbent
- Assumed office 11 May 2026; Opposition senator

Personal details
- Party: United Progressive Party

Ashworth Azille is a United Progressive Party politician, who was appointed to the Senate of Antigua and Barbuda for the opposition on 11 May 2026.
