= Malaka Parker =

Antiguan politician

Member of the Senate of Antigua and Barbuda
- Incumbent
- Assumed office 18 May 2026; Opposition senator
- In office 12 March 2009 – 26 April 2014; Government senator

Personal details
- Party: United Progressive Party

Malaka Parker is a United Progressive Party politician, who was appointed to the Senate of Antigua and Barbuda for the government on 12 March 2009. She was intended to be sworn in for a second term as a senator on 11 May 2026, although she was unable to be sworn in due to "extenuating circumstances". She was appointed on 18 May.
