= Shaquan O'Neil =

Antiguan politician

Member of the Senate of Antigua and Barbuda
- Incumbent
- Assumed office 8 May 2026; Government senator

Personal details
- Party: Antigua and Barbuda Labour Party

Shaquan O'Neil is an Antigua and Barbuda Labour Party politician, who was appointed to the Senate of Antigua and Barbuda for the government on 8 May 2026. He is the youngest senator in the history of the country, being appointed at just 22 years old– one year above the minimum age of 21.
