= Dwayne George =

Antiguan politician

Member of the House of Representatives of Antigua and Barbuda
- Incumbent
- Assumed office 30 April 2026
- Preceded by: Kelvin Simon
- Constituency: St. Mary's South

Member of the Senate of Antigua and Barbuda
- In office 26 October 2023 – 1 April 2026; Government senator
- Preceded by: Vacant (himself)
- In office 3 August 2023 – 29 September 2023; Government senator
- Preceded by: Caleb Gardiner (vacancy)

Personal details
- Party: Antigua and Barbuda Labour Party

Dwayne George is an Antigua and Barbuda Labour Party politician from the St. Mary's South constituency. He was appointed to the Senate of Antigua and Barbuda for the government on 3 August 2023, filling a vacancy created by the appointment of Caleb Gardiner as a diplomat in Washington D.C. He was reappointed on 26 October 2023 as Minister of State in Ministry of Finance, Corporate Governance and Public Private Partnerships, following his loss in the St. Mary's South by-election to United Progressive Party candidate Kelvin Simon. He was elected to the House of Representatives for St. Mary's South in the 2026 Antiguan general election.
