= Angelica O'Donoghue =

Antiguan politician

Member of the Senate of Antigua and Barbuda
- Incumbent
- Assumed office 8 May 2026; Government senator

Personal details
- Party: Antigua and Barbuda Labour Party

Angelica O'Donoghue is an Antigua and Barbuda Labour Party politician, who was appointed to the Senate of Antigua and Barbuda for the government on 8 May 2026.
