= Knacyntar Nedd =

Antigua and Barbuda politician

Knacyntar Nedd Charles

Member of the Senate of Antigua and Barbuda
- Incumbent
- Assumed office 26 March 2018; Government senator for Barbuda
- Preceded by: Adrian Lee
- In office 20 June 2016 – 26 February 2018; Barbuda Council senator Government senator
- Preceded by: Shenique Fortune
- Succeeded by: Fabian Jones

Personal details
- Party: Antigua and Barbuda Labour Party

Knacyntar Nedd Charles (/nəˈsɪntə/) is an Antigua and Barbuda Labour Party politician, who was appointed to the Senate of Antigua and Barbuda as the government Barbuda senator on 26 March 2018. Nedd was also the Barbuda Council senator from 20 June 2016 to 26 February 2018, sitting with the government.
