= Abena St. Luce =

Antiguan politician

Member of the Senate of Antigua and Barbuda
- Incumbent
- Assumed office 8 May 2026; Government senator

Personal details
- Party: Antigua and Barbuda Labour Party

Abena St. Luce is an Antigua and Barbuda Labour Party politician, who was appointed to the Senate of Antigua and Barbuda for the government on 8 May 2026. She is the daughter of John St. Luce.
