= Grays Hill =

Coordinates: 17°6′16″N 61°50′54″W

- Village
- Interactive map of Grays Hill
- Country: Antigua and Barbuda
- Parish: Saint John

Area
  - Total: 0.28 km^{2} (0.11 sq mi)

Population (2011)
  - Total: 542

Grays Hill is a village in Saint John, Antigua and Barbuda. It had a population of 542 people in 2011.

== Geography ==
According to the Antigua and Barbuda Statistics Division, the village had a total area of 0.28 square kilometres in 2011.

== Demographics ==
There were 542 people living in Grays Hill as of the 2011 census. The village was 97.56% African, 1.43% Hispanic, 0.81% other, and 0.20% not stated. The population was born in different countries, including 68.23% in Antigua and Barbuda, 10.39% in Dominica, 8.55% in Jamaica, and 3.46% in Guyana. The population had diverse religious affiliations, including 19.55% Pentecostal, 13.99% Adventist, and 10.49% Anglican.
