= Kendra Beazer =

Antiguan politician

Member of the Senate of Antigua and Barbuda
- Incumbent
- Assumed office 8 May 2026; Government senator for Barbuda

Personal details
- Party: Antigua and Barbuda Labour Party

Kendra Beazer is an Antigua and Barbuda Labour Party politician, who was appointed to the Senate of Antigua and Barbuda as the government Barbuda senator on 8 May 2026. He was the party's candidate in Barbuda for the 2026 general election.
