= Johnathan Joseph (politician) =

Antigua and Barbuda politician

Member of the Senate of Antigua and Barbuda
- Incumbent
- Assumed office 26 March 2018; Opposition senator

Personal details
- Party: United Progressive Party

Johnathan Joseph is a United Progressive Party politician, who was appointed to the Senate of Antigua and Barbuda for the opposition on 26 March 2018.

On Dec. 17, 2023, together with other senators from the opposition, decides to abandon the Senate debate on the approval of the annual budget in protest against the government, whom blame for not allowing enough time for the speeches.

On 8 February 2024 calls for the immediate firing of Health Minister, Sir Molwyn Joseph accusing him of unprecedented incompetence.

== See also ==
- Gaston Browne
- Molwyn Joseph
- Antigua.news
