= Melford Nicholas =

Minister of Government from Antigua & Barbuda

The Honourable Melford Walter Nicholas
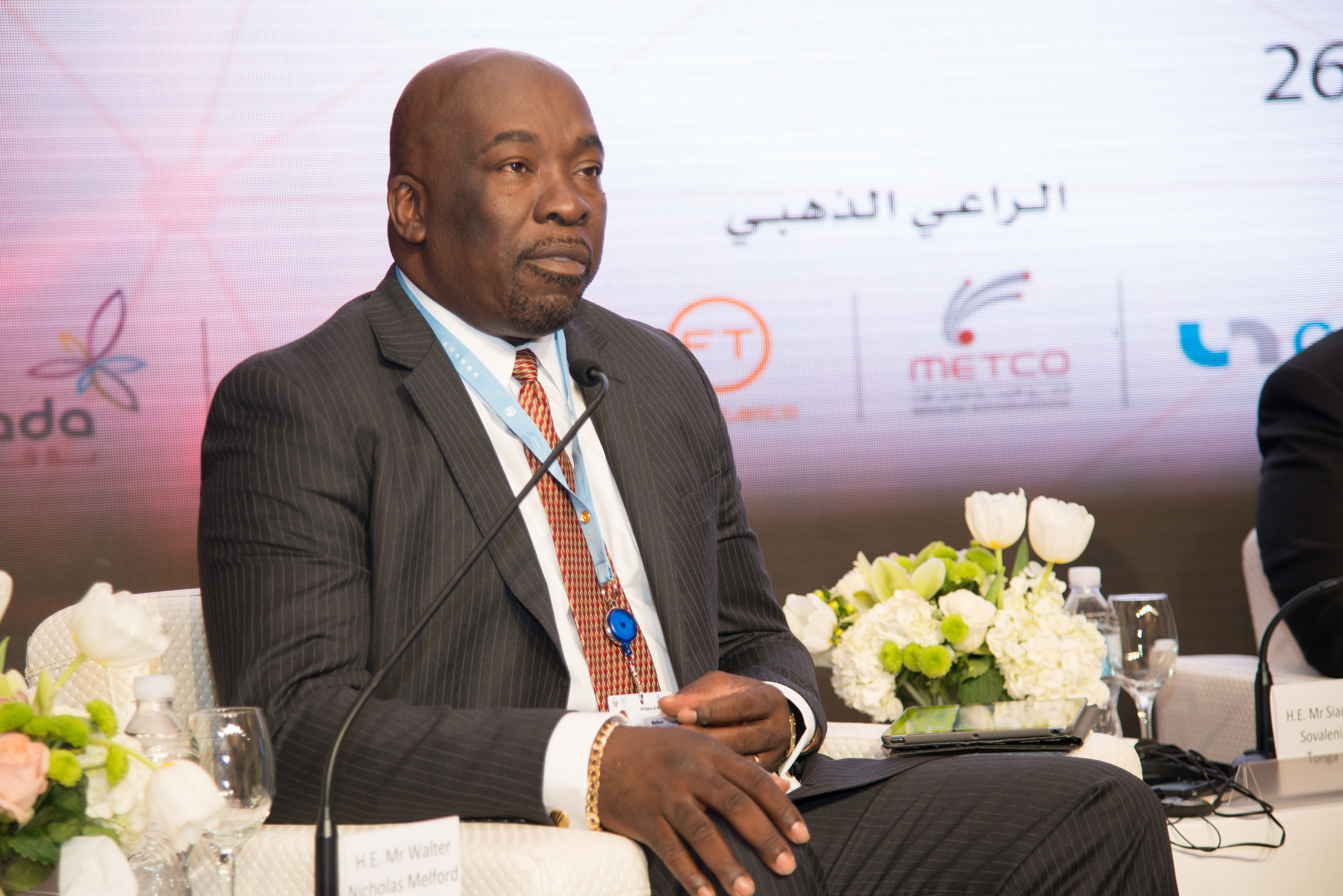

Member of the House of Representatives of Antigua and Barbuda
- Incumbent
- Assumed office 12 June 2014
- Monarch: Elizabeth II
- Governors General: Louise Lake-Tack, Rodney Williams
- Preceded by: Harold Lovell
- Constituency: St. John's City East

Personal details
- Born: St. Johnston, Saint John
- Party: Antigua and Barbuda Labour Party
- Spouse: Sincere Nicholas

Melford Nicholas is an Antiguan politician, Member of Parliament and Cabinet Minister. He is currently the parliamentary representative for St. John's City East. He is a member of the Antigua and Barbuda Labour Party.

== Early life ==
He was born and raised in St. Johnston, Saint John.

== Political career ==
He founded the Organisation for National Development, and he first contested in the 2009 general elections, the Organisation for National Development later merged into the Antigua and Barbuda Labour Party.

Nicholas won the St. John's City East seat under the Antigua and Barbuda Labour Party in both the 2014 and 2018 general elections. On 18 June 2014, he was appointed Minister of Information, Broadcasting, Telecommunications, and Information Technology, and still is the Minister as of January 2021.

He was elected again to the House of Representatives in the 2023 general elections for the St. John's City East Constituency and confirmed as Minister of Information, Communication Technologies (ICTs), Utilities and Energy in the Government of the Prime Minister Gaston Browne.

== See also ==
- Gaston Browne
- Charles Fernandez
- E.P. Chet Greene
