= Jamilla Kirwan =

Antiguan politician

Member of the Senate of Antigua and Barbuda
- Incumbent
- Assumed office 28 November 2025; Governor-General's senator
- Governor-General: Rodney Williams
- Preceded by: Kiz Johnson

Personal details
- Party: Independent

Jamilla Kirwan is an independent politician, who was appointed to the Senate of Antigua and Barbuda at the Governor-General's discretion on 28 November 2025. Kirwan brought the Senate back to its full size of seventeen people. Kirwan replaced Kiz Johnson who had resigned. She was reappointed on 12 May 2026.
