= Cheryl Mary Clare Hurst =

Antiguan and Barbudan politician (1962–2026)

Member of the Senate of Antigua and Barbuda
- In office 24 June 2014 – 1 April 2026
- Prime Minister: Gaston Browne
- Succeeded by: Richie Richardson

Personal details
- Born: 6 November 1962
- Died: May 2026 (aged 63)
- Party: Antigua and Barbuda Labour Party

Cheryl Mary Clare Hurst (6 November 1962 – May 2026) was an Antiguan and Barbudan politician. She was a senator of the Upper House of Parliament in Antigua and Barbuda. She was appointed senator by Prime Minister Gaston Browne. She was also the first female General Secretary of the Antigua and Barbuda Labour Party. Hurst was appointed senator after the 2014 general elections held in Antigua and Barbuda.

In 2018, she was appointed senator after the 2018 general elections of Antigua and Barbuda. She retained this seat in 2023.

Hurst announced on 21 August 2024 that she would be stepping down from the Senate for personal reasons. She was scheduled to be replaced by Richie Richardson.

Hurst died in May 2026, at the age of 63.

== See also ==
- Senate (Antigua and Barbuda)
