= Fabian Jones =

Barbuda People's Movement politician

Member of the Senate of Antigua and Barbuda
- Incumbent
- Assumed office 26 March 2018; Barbuda Council senator Opposition senator
- Preceded by: Knacyntar Nedd
- Succeeded by: Vacant

Personal details
- Party: Barbuda People's Movement

Fabian Jones is a Barbuda People's Movement politician, who was appointed to the Senate of Antigua and Barbuda for the opposition and Barbuda Council on 26 March 2018. Jones was sworn in for a third term on 29 June 2026.
