= St. John's Rural East =

Coordinates: 17°7′49″N 61°49′58″W

- Parliamentary constituency for the Parliament of Antigua and Barbuda
- Parish: Saint John
- Polling divisions: 14
- Electorate: 5,187 (2026)

Current constituency
- Seats: 1
- Party: ABLP
- Member: Maria Browne

St. John's Rural East is a parliamentary constituency in Saint John Parish, Antigua and Barbuda.

The constituency has 4,474 registered electors and 14 polling districts. Its counting centre is at the St. John's Catholic Primary, on Old Parham Road.

The constituency is represented by Maria Browne, and was once the seat of former prime minister Lester Bird.

== Electoral history ==
Party	1971	1976	1980	1984	1989	1994	1999	2004	2009	2014	2018	2023	2026
ALP	37.01%	58.57%	68.58%	83.76%	76.72%	67.10%	63.58%	47.46%	50.26%	57.95%	65.90%	53.73%	68.15%
UPP	-	-	-	16.24%	20.42%	32.90%	34.29%	52.54%	47.77%	42.05%	29.55%	44.32%	31.85%
PLM	56.26%	41.43%	29.70%	-	-	-	-	-	-	-	-	-	-
Others	6.74%	0.00%	1.72%	0.00%	2.86%	0.00%	2.13%	0.00%	1.97%	0.00%	4.06%	1.45%	0.00%
Valid	935	1,709	1,394	1,127	1,538	1,924	2,680	3,723	3,858	3,700	3,300	3,278	3,121
Invalid	3	14	8	4	10	13	7	13	9	19		16	23
Total	938	1,723	1,402	1,131	1,548	1,937	2,687	3,736	3,867	3,719		3,294	3,144
Registered	1,579	1,822	1,959	2,097	2,656	3,336	4,213	4,104	4,823	4,169		5,004	5,187
Turnout	59.40%	94.57%	71.57%	53.93%	58.28%	58.06%	63.78%	91.03%	80.18%	89.21%		65.83%	60.61%

== Members of parliament ==
Results
Year	Winner	Party	% Votes
1971	Gerald Watt	PLM	56.26%
1976	Lester Bird	ALP	58.57%
1980	Lester Bird	ALP	68.58%
1984	Lester Bird	ALP	83.76%
1989	Lester Bird	ALP	76.72%
1994	Lester Bird	ALP	67.10%
1999	Lester Bird	ALP	63.58%
2004	Leon Errol Cort	UPP	52.54%
2009	Lester Bird	ALP	50.26%
2014	Lester Bird	ABLP	57.95%
2018	Maria Browne	ABLP	66.23%
2023	Maria Browne	ABLP	53.73%
2026	Maria Browne	ABLP	64.89%
