= Deputy President of the Senate of Antigua and Barbuda =

Second-highest ranking-official of the Senate of Antigua and Barbuda

- Incumbent; Phillip Shoul since 5 March 2025
- Legislature
- Style: Mr Deputy President
- Member of: Senate of Antigua and Barbuda
- Constituting instrument: Constitution of Antigua and Barbuda

The deputy president of the Antigua and Barbuda Senate is the second-highest-ranking member of the Senate of Antigua and Barbuda, after the president. The current deputy president is Phillip Shoul of the Labour Party.

== List ==
- Osbert Frederick (25 June 2014 – 14 November 2024)
- Rawdon Turner (19 November 2024 - 5 March 2025)
