= Lamin Newton =

Antiguan politician

Member of the Senate of Antigua and Barbuda
- Incumbent
- Assumed office 29 November 2024; Government senator

Personal details
- Party: Antigua and Barbuda Labour Party

Lamin Newton is an Antigua and Barbuda Labour Party politician, who was appointed to the Senate of Antigua and Barbuda for the government on 29 November 2024.
