= Colin O'Neil Browne =

Antiguan and Barbudan politician

Member of the Senate of Antigua and Barbuda
- Incumbent
- Assumed office 26 March 2018
- Prime Minister: Gaston Browne

Personal details
- Party: Antigua and Barbuda Labour Party

Colin O'Neil Browne is a politician from Antigua and Barbuda. He is a senator of the Upper House of Parliament in Antigua and Barbuda. He was appointed senator by Prime Minister Gaston Browne. Browne was appointed senator after the 2018 general elections held in Antigua and Barbuda on 26 March 2018.

The ABLP Senator, Colin O’Neal Browne, is co-host (alongside Prime Minister Hon. Gaston Browne) of the Browne and Browne show on Pointe FM.Senator Browne is the former Station Manager at Pointe FM.

== See also ==
- Senate (Antigua and Barbuda)
