= Osbert Frederick =

Antiguan and Barbudan politician

Osbert Richard Frederick

7th Speaker of the House of Representatives of Antigua and Barbuda
- Incumbent
- Assumed office 18 November 2024
- Prime Minister: Gaston Browne
- Preceded by: Gerald Watt

Deputy Senate President in the Senate of Antigua and Barbuda
- In office 25 June 2014 – 14 November 2024
- Succeeded by: Rawdon Turner

Member of the Senate of Antigua and Barbuda
- In office 24 June 2014 – 14 November 2024

Personal details
- Born: 20 March 1960 (age 66)
- Party: Antigua and Barbuda Labour Party

Osbert Richard Frederick (born 20 March 1960) is an Antiguan and Barbudan politician. He was appointed senator by Prime Minister Gaston Browne. After his appointment, he was elected the Deputy President in the Upper House of Parliament in Antigua and Barbuda.

== Early life and education ==
Osbert Richard Frederick was born on 20 March 1960 in All Saints, Antigua and Barbuda. He attended the Antigua Seventh Day Adventist School where he completed his secondary school education. After his secondary education he attended University of the Virgin Islands in 1988 where he obtained his BSc and MSc in Tourism and Hospitality Management.

== Career ==
Frederick lost his first election when he contested the All Saints East and St. Luke seat for the Antigua Labour Party in the 2009 general election of Antigua and Barbuda, losing to Chester Hughes of the United Progressive Party. He was appointed senator in 2014 by prime minister Gaston Browne during the 2014 general elections of Antigua and Barbuda.

During the first sitting of the Upper House of Parliament in Antigua and Barbuda he was appointed deputy senate president. In 2018, he was re-appointed senator.

On 18 November 2024, he became the Speaker of the House of Representatives after resigning as deputy senate president on 14 November.

== See also ==
- Senate (Antigua and Barbuda)
