= St. John's City East =

- Constituency for the Parliament of Antigua and Barbuda
- Electorate: 2,167 (2026)

Current constituency
- Party: ABLP
- Member: Melford Walter Nicholas

St. John's City East is a parliamentary constituency in the city of St. John's, Antigua. The constituency has two polling divisions and is composed of the areas of Cross Street, Dickenson Bay Street, and Friars Hill Road.

== Polling divisions ==
The constituency has two polling divisions, A and B. During the 2023 elections, polling division A had one polling station and voted overwhelmingly for the ABLP. Polling division B had several polling stations and had a minimal difference between the number of ABLP votes and UPP votes.

== Electoral history ==
Party	1971	1976	1980	1984	1989	1994	1999	2004	2009	2014	2018	2023	2026
ALP	38.37%	54.93%	65.34%	91.25%	89.21%	66.08%	59.76%	37.79%	54.97%	53.79%	54.42%	49.59%	64.89%
UPP	-	-	-	8.75%	8.18%	33.92%	40.24%	62.21%	45.03%	46.21%	43.59%	49.21%	35.11%
PLM	48.17%	45.07%	31.97%	-	-	-	-	-	-	-	-	-	-
Others	13.46%	0.00%	2.69%	0.00%	2.61%	0.00%	0.00%	0.00%	0.00%	0.00%	1.27%	0.81%	0.00%
Valid	602	832	854	811	1,112	1,371	1,640	1,556	1,471	1,476	1,413	1,589	1,330
Invalid	20	3	3	7	10	10	7	16	14	4		6	13
Total	622	835	857	818	1,122	1,381	1,647	1,572	1,485	1,480		1,595	1,343
Registered	811	870	1,051	1,222	1,625	2,047	2,483	1,691	1,855	1,585		2,166	2,167
Turnout	76.70%	95.98%	81.54%	66.94%	69.05%	67.46%	66.33%	92.96%	80.05%	93.38%		73.64%	61.98%

== Members of parliament ==
Year	Winner	Party	% Votes
1971	Basil Peters	PLM	48.17%
1976	John St. Luce	ALP	54.93%
1980	John St. Luce	ALP	65.34%
1984	John St. Luce	ALP	91.25%
1989	John St. Luce	ALP	89.21%
1994	John St. Luce	ALP	66.08%
1999	John St. Luce	ALP	59.76%
2004	Harold Lovell	UPP	62.21%
2009	Harold Lovell	UPP	56.15%
2014	Melford Walter Nicholas	ABLP	53.79%
2018	Melford Walter Nicholas	ABLP	54.81%
2023	Melford Walter Nicholas	ABLP	49.59%
2026	Melford Walter Nicholas	ABLP	64.89%
