= 2018 Antiguan general election =

- 21 March 2018

All 17 elected seats in the House of Representatives 9 seats needed for a majority
- Turnout: 76.51% (▼13.76pp)
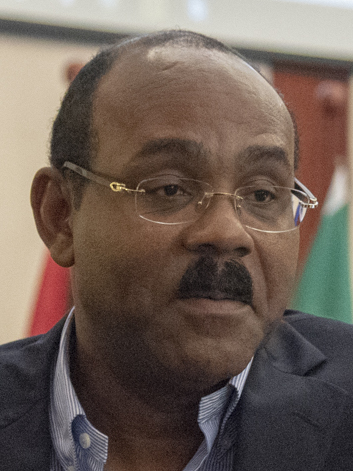

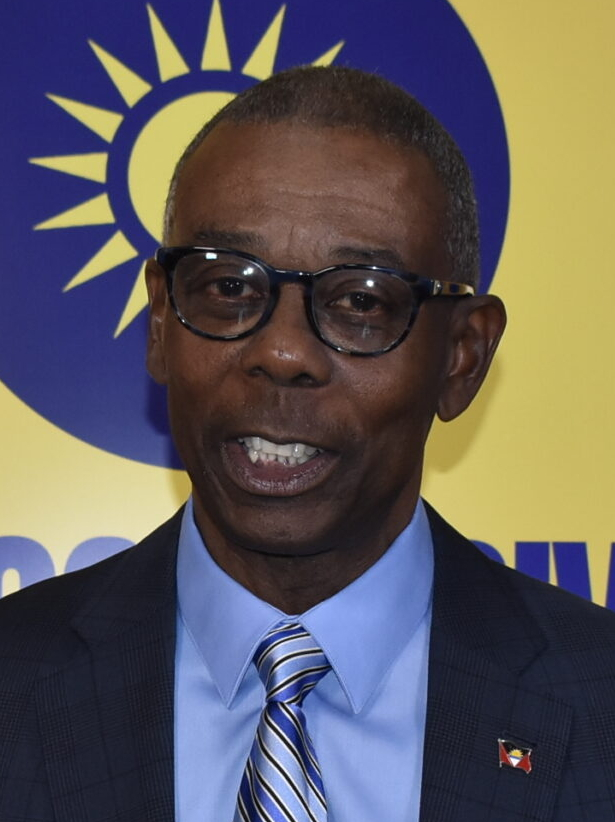

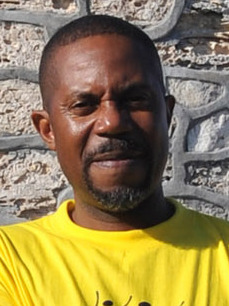
	First party	Second party	Third party
Leader	Gaston Browne	Harold Lovell	Trevor Walker
Party	ABLP	UPP	BPM
Last election	56.45%, 14 seats	41.95%, 3 seats	1.13%, 0 seats
Seats won	15	1	1
Seat change	▲1	▼2	▲1
Popular vote	23,063	14,440	558
Percentage	59.24%	37.09%	1.43%
Swing	▲2.79pp	▼4.86pp	▲0.30pp
- Results by constituency
Prime Minister before election
Gaston Browne
ABLP
Subsequent Prime Minister
Gaston Browne
ABLP

General elections were held in Antigua and Barbuda on 21 March 2018 to elect members to House of Representatives of the 15th Antigua and Barbuda Parliament. Each of the 17 constituencies elected one Member of Parliament (MP).

The governing Antigua and Barbuda Labour Party led by Gaston Browne was returned to power, winning 15 of the 17 seats, increasing their majority by one seat. The United Progressive Party, the official opposition, led by Harold Lovell, was reduced to a single seat and Lovell failed to be elected.

== Electoral system ==
The 17 elected members of the House of Representatives were elected in single-member constituencies by first-past-the-post voting; 16 of the seats were allocated for the island of Antigua and one for the island of Barbuda. Barbudan electors were required to travel to Antigua to vote as a result of the aftermath of Hurricane Irma.

== Campaign ==
A total of 53 candidates contested the elections, representing seven parties. The Antigua and Barbuda Labour Party nominated a full slate of 17 candidates. The United Progressive Party nominated candidates only on the island of Antigua due to an electoral pact with the Barbuda People's Movement which stood only on the island of Barbuda. Together they fielded a candidate in every seat. The Democratic National Alliance (13) were the only other party to contest more than half the seats. The Antigua Barbuda True Labour Party and Go Green for Life both had two candidates, while the Barbuda People's Movement (affiliated to the United Progressive Party) and Missing Link VOP had a single candidate. A single independent candidate, Attorney-at-law Ralph Francis, contested the seat of Barbuda.

Prime Minister Gaston Browne dissolved parliament fifteen months early. The main issues were the re-building and response to the 2017 Hurricane season, the Barbudan communal land ownership law, tourism resorts notably the Sandals Resorts, and a bribery scandal involving Browne.

== Results ==
Party	Votes	%	Seats	+/–
Antigua and Barbuda Labour Party	23,063	59.24	15	+1
United Progressive Party	14,440	37.09	1	–2
Democratic National Alliance	754	1.94	0	New
Barbuda People's Movement	558	1.43	1	+1
Antigua & Barbuda True Labour Party	87	0.22	0	0
Go Green for Life	20	0.05	0	New
Missing Link VOP	6	0.02	0	0
Independents	4	0.01	0	New
Total	38,932	100.00	17	0
Valid votes	38,932	99.27		
Invalid/blank votes	288	0.73		
Total votes	39,220	100.00		
Registered voters/turnout	51,258	76.51		
Source: ABEC

=== By constituency ===
Constituency	ABLP		UPP		DNA		GGL		BPM		Ind		Total
Constituency	Votes	%	Votes	%	Votes	%	Votes	%	Votes	%	Votes	%	Total
All Saints East and St. Luke	1,369	47.65	1,379	47.99	106	3.68	7	0.24					2,873
All Saints West	1,726	54.31	1,380	43.42	51	1.60							3,178
Barbuda	429	42.01					13	1.27	558	54.65	4	0.39	1,021
St. George	2,083	56.68	1,452	39.51	121	3.29							3,675
St. John's City East	769	54.42	616	43.59	18	1.27							1,413
St. John's City South	895	69.60	355	27.60	23	1.78							1,286
St. John's City West	1,457	70.90	565	27.49	15	0.73							2,055
St. John's Rural East	2,175	65.90	975	29.55	134	4.06							3,300
St. John's Rural North	1,708	59.90	1,057	37.07	58	2.03							2,851
St. John's Rural South	1,502	62.53	755	31.43	38	1.58							2,402
St. John's Rural West	1,712	50.86	1,528	45.39	113	3.35							3,366
St. Mary's North	1,882	60.40	1,220	39.15									3,116
St. Mary's South	942	50.08	911	48.43	18	0.96							1,881
St. Paul	1,315	59.42	836	37.78	53	2.39							2,213
St. Peter	1,736	73.12	577	24.30									2,374
St. Philip North	884	70.49	355	28.30									1,254
St. Philip South	479	49.79	459	47.71	6	0.62							962
Total	23,063	59.24	14,440	37.09	754	1.94	20	0.05	558	1.43	4	0.01	38,932
Source: ABEC
