= Shenella Govia =

Antigua and Barbuda politician

Member of the Senate of Antigua and Barbuda
- Incumbent
- Assumed office 24 June 2014

Personal details
- Party: Antigua and Barbuda Labour Party

Shenella Mary Shadida Govia is a politician from Antigua and Barbuda. She is a senator of the Upper House of Parliament in Antigua and Barbuda since 2014.

On 16 November 2024, Govia was appointed Minister of State in the Ministry of Education, Sport, and Creative Industries.
