= Phillip Shoul =

Antigua and Barbuda politician

Member of the Senate of Antigua and Barbuda
- Incumbent
- Assumed office 26 March 2018

Deputy President of the Senate of Antigua and Barbuda
- Incumbent
- Assumed office 5 March 2025
- Preceded by: Rawdon Turner

Personal details
- Party: Antigua and Barbuda Labour Party

Phillip Shoul is an Antigua and Barbuda Labour Party politician, who was appointed to the Senate of Antigua and Barbuda for the government on 26 March 2018. He was elected as Deputy President of the Senate on 5 March 2025.
