= St. John's Rural North =

Parliamentary constituency of Antigua and Barbuda

- Constituency for the Parliament of Antigua and Barbuda
- Polling divisions: 2
- Electorate: 4,373 (2026)

Current constituency
- Party: ABLP
- Member: Charles Fernandez

St. John's Rural North is a parliamentary constituency in Saint John and Saint George, Antigua and Barbuda. It is primarily composed of the areas of North Coast, Crosbies, Coolidge and Cedar Grove.

== Polling divisions ==
St. John's Rural North has two polling divisions, "A" and "B". Polling division A is composed primarily of the North Coast area and polling division B is composed primarily of the Cedar Grove area. In the 2023 general elections, both polling divisions voted primarily for the ABLP, with some stations voting for the UPP.

== Electoral history ==
Party	1971	1976	1980	1984	1989	1994	1999	2004	2009	2014	2018	2023	2026
ALP	50.46%	62.76%	77.12%	90.90%	69.23%	58.58%	54.11%	37.05%	48.12%	60.55%	59.90%	52.46%	60.14%
UPP	-	-	-	9.10%	30.77%	41.42%	45.89%	62.95%	51.88%	39.23%	37.07%	45.58%	39.86%
PLM	39.71%	37.24%	22.88%	-	-	-	-	-	-	-	-	-	-
Others	9.84%	0.00%	0.00%	0.00%	0.00%	0.00%	0.00%	0.00%	0.00%	0.23%	2.03%	1.40%	0.00%
Valid	549	929	861	681	1,066	1,451	2,092	2,745	2,818	3,072	2,851	2,963	2,647
Invalid	2	0	3	4	8	4	5	9	9	17		13	26
Total	551	929	864	685	1,074	1,455	2,097	2,754	2,827	3,089		2,978	2,673
Registered	797	1,017	1,136	1,235	1,582	2,122	3,019	3,023	3,577	3,406		4,187	4,373
Turnout	69.13%	91.35%	76.06%	55.47%	67.89%	68.57%	69.46%	91.10%	79.03%	90.69%		71.12%	61.13%

== Members of parliament ==
The constituency is currently represented by Charles Fernandez.

Year	Winner	Party	% Votes
1971	Denfield Hurst	ALP	50.46%
1976	V.C. Bird	ALP	62.76%
1980	V.C. Bird	ALP	77.12%
1984	V.C. Bird	ALP	90.90%
1989	V.C. Bird	ALP	69.23%
1994	Bernard Percival	ALP	58.58%
1999	Bernard Percival	ALP	54.11%
2004	Hubert John Maginley	UPP	62.95%
2009	Hubert John Maginley	UPP	51.88%
2014	Charles Fernandez	ABLP	60.55%
2018	Charles Fernandez	ABLP	60.37%
2023	Charles Fernandez	ABLP	52.46%
2026	Charles Fernandez	ABLP	60.14%
