= Alincia Williams-Grant =

Antiguan and Barbudan politician

President of the Senate of Antigua and Barbuda
- Incumbent
- Assumed office 25 June 2014
- Preceded by: Hazelyn Francis

Member of the Senate of Antigua and Barbuda
- Incumbent
- Assumed office 24 June 2014

Personal details
- Born: 2 September 1972 (age 53) New Winthorpes, Saint George
- Party: Antigua and Barbuda Labour Party

Alincia T. H. Williams-Grant is an Antiguan politician. She was appointed as a Senator and elected as the President of the Upper House of Parliament in Antigua and Barbuda in June 2014.

== Early life ==
Alincia Williams-Grant was born on 2 September 1972. She holds a Bachelor of Laws (LL.B.) from the University of Wolverhampton, and a Legal Education Certificate from the Hugh Wooding Law School.

== Career ==
Prior to her appointment in the Upper House, Senator Williams-Grant served for six years on the Board of Directors of the Antigua Commercial Bank (ACB) from 2008. She also served as a member of the Corporate Governance, Human Resource and Investment Committees and she was the Chairperson of the Strategic Review Committee. She was a former Legal Counsel/Corporate Secretary to the Board of the ACB Group and previously worked as a Legal Officer at the Eastern Caribbean Central Bank from 2002 to 2004.

For upwards of eight years, Senator Williams-Grant has been the managing director and Senior Attorney at the civil law practice of Williams Grant Inc., Attorneys-At-Law & Notaries Public. Senator Williams-Grant is recognised for her interest in community and national development. She has served at varying levels of her local Kiwanis International Club, including Club President, and has held and continues to hold the position of director and of secretary of local charities and non-governmental organisations designed to empower and serve women and youth. She was the Treasurer of the Antigua and Barbuda Bar Council from 2009 to 2015 and currently holds the position of Trustee and Executive Member of the Antigua Trades and Labour Union. She contested the Antigua & Barbuda Political Primary in the St. George's Constituency in 2007 and serves as a Legal Advisor to the Party.

In 2025, Williams-Grant was awarded a Women of Wadadli and Wa’Omoni Award in the category of Political Leadership.
