= All Saints East & St. Luke =

Antiguan and Barbudan constituency

- Constituency for the Parliament of Antigua and Barbuda
- Parish: Saint Mary, Saint John
- Polling divisions: 4
- Electorate: 4,220 (2026)

Current constituency
- Party: UPP
- Member: Jamale Pringle

All Saints East & St. Luke is a parliamentary constituency in the parishes of Saint John and Saint Mary, Antigua and Barbuda. It is composed of the villages of Matthews, Swetes, Bishops, John Hughes, Sawcolts, Old Road, and the eastern portion of All Saints.

== Polling districts ==
The constituency has four polling districts, A, B, C, and D. Polling district A is composed of portions of All Saints, and Matthews. Polling district B is composed of Swetes. Polling district C is composed of John Hughes, Bishops, and Sawcolts. Polling district D is composed of Old Road, and the minor localities and/or Old Road neighbourhoods of Morris Bay, Claremont, Kingston, Traumentania, and Curtain Bluff. In the 2023 general elections, all four polling districts were dominated by the UPP. Only one polling district in the constituency was dominated by the ABLP.

== Electoral history ==
Party	1984	1989	1994	1999	2004	2009	2014	2018	2023	2026
ABLP	51.68%	52.17%	46.37%	40.00%	34.13%	32.87%	45.78%	47.65%	36.00%	46.90%
UPP	48.32%	46.02%	53.63%	60.00%	64.44%	66.36%	52.83%	47.99%	61.86%	53.10%
Others	0.00%	1.81%	0.00%	0.00%	1.43%	0.76%	0.39%	3.92%	1.70%	0.00%
Valid	1,484	1,660	2,133	2,435	2,722	2,753	3,074	2,873	2,908	2,642
Invalid	14	8	10	18	16	8	13		10	12
Total	1,498	1,668	2,143	2,453	2,738	2,761	3,087		2,918	2,654
Registered	2,398	2,855	3,350	3,917	3,074	3,457	3,365		4,128	4,220
Turnout	62.47%	58.42%	63.97%	62.62%	89.07%	79.87%	91.74%		70.69%	62.89%

== Members of parliament ==
The current member of parliament is Leader of the Opposition Jamale Pringle.

Year	Winner	Party	% Votes
1984	Eustace Cochrane	ALP	51.68%
1989	Eustace Cochrane	ALP	52.17%
1994	Charlesworth Samuel	UPP	53.63%
1999	Charlesworth Samuel	UPP	60.00%
2004	Charlesworth Samuel	UPP	64.44%
2009	Chester Hughes	UPP	66.36%
2014	Joanne Massiah	UPP	52.83%
2018	Jamale Pringle	UPP	48.20%
2023	Jamale Pringle	UPP	61.86%
2026	Jamale Pringle	UPP	53.10%
