= Parliament of Antigua and Barbuda =

Bicameral legislature of Antigua and Barbuda

Coordinates: 17°07′04″N 61°50′00″W

- 17th legislature

Type
- Type: Bicameral
- Houses: Senate; House of Representatives

Structure
- Seats: 34 members 17 senators 17 representatives
- Senate political groups: Labour (11); UPP (4); BPM (1); Independent (1)
- House of Representatives political groups: Government: Labour (15); Opposition: UPP (1); BPM (1)

Elections
- House of Representatives voting system: First-past-the-post
- Last House of Representatives election: 30 April 2026

Meeting place
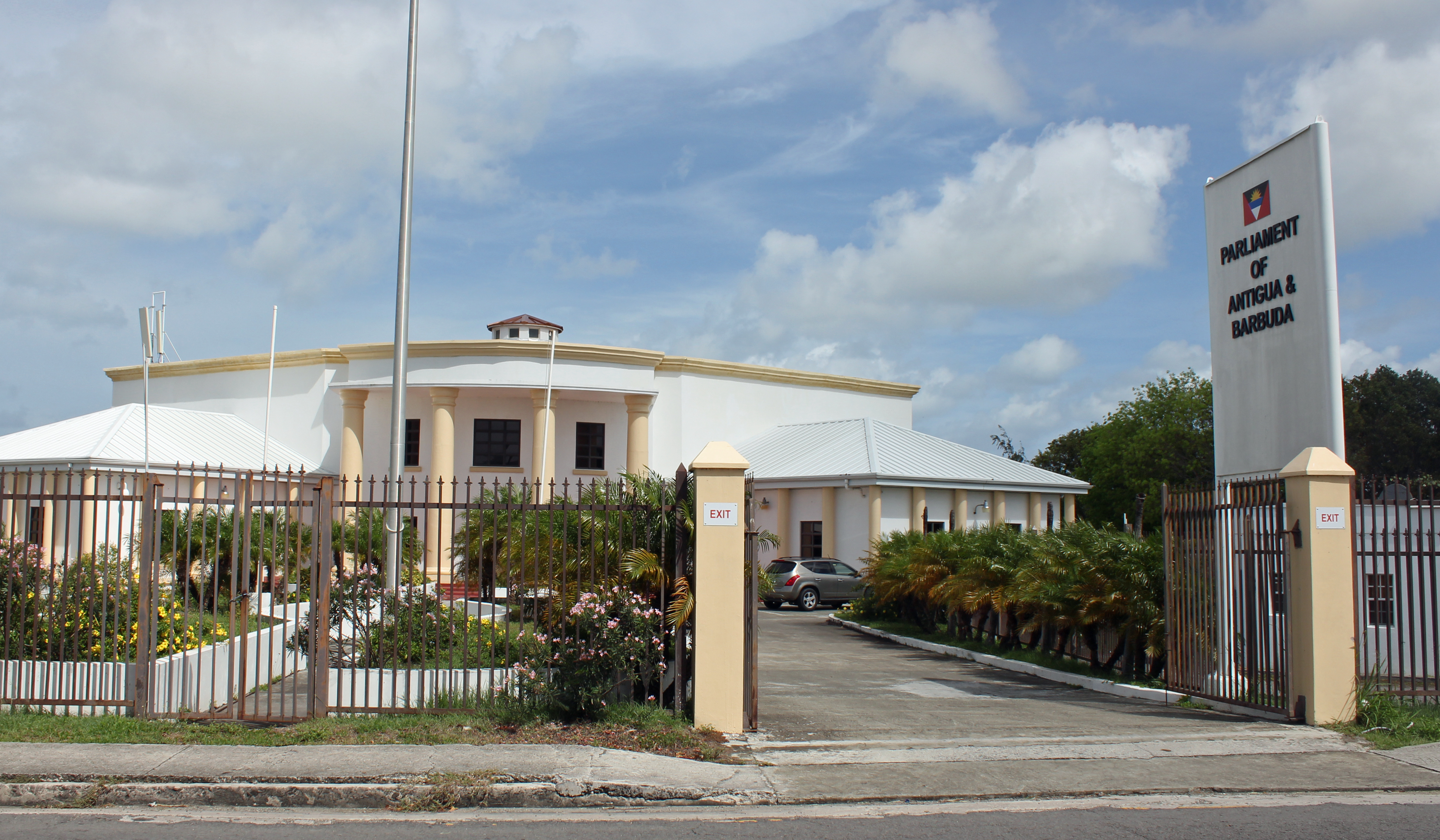
- Antigua and Barbuda Parliament Building, St. John's

Website
- ab.gov.ag/detail_page.php?page=8

The Parliament of Antigua and Barbuda (Spanish: Parlamento de Antigua y Barbuda; Antiguan and Barbudan Creole: Paaliment a' Aanteega an' Baabyuuda) consists of the King of Antigua and Barbuda, the Senate and the House of Representatives.

Section 27 of the Constitution establishes the Parliament. Parliament has the authority to enact laws for Antigua and Barbuda's peace, order, and well-being as long as they adhere to the terms of the Constitution. In accordance with the guidelines in section 47, Parliament may amend any clause in the Constitution or the Supreme Court's order. A law that would amend the Constitution or a Supreme Court ruling would not be considered passed by the House unless it received approval from at least two-thirds of all House members at its final reading.

No member of either House of Parliament may participate in that House's proceedings (except than those required for the purposes of section 48) unless he has taken the oath of loyalty before that House and subscribed to it: However, before the members of the Senate or the House, depending on the situation, have taken and signed such an oath, elections for the positions of President, Vice President, Speaker, and Deputy Speaker may still take place. Any person who is a member of the House by virtue of holding the office of Speaker or by virtue of holding or functioning in the office of Attorney-General is referred to as a member of the House in section 48.

According to section 51 of the constitution, any issue put to a vote in a House of Parliament must be decided by a majority of the members present and voting, unless otherwise specified in the Constitution. Except as otherwise specified in this section, the President or other member presiding in the Senate and the Speaker or other person presiding in the House shall have and exercise a casting vote in the event that the votes are evenly divided on any question: With the exception that a Speaker or other member presiding in the House who is an elected member of the House shall have an original vote but no casting vote in the case of the question of the final reading of a bill as is referenced in section 47(2) of the Constitution. If the votes on any subject before the House are evenly divided while such a Speaker is in office, the motion will be defeated. A Speaker who is not an elected member of the House shall have neither an original nor a casting vote.

== History ==
The Legislative Council of Antigua was the predecessor of the Parliament. It first sat on 23 April 1668 [O.S. 13 April 1668] (then the bicameral Legislature of Antigua) and became the Parliament on 27 February 1967.

== Functions ==
The Parliament as a whole is charged with certain responsibilities and is given special powers and privileges in order to effectively carry out its functions. Included among the latter are freedom of speech in Parliament, the authority to regulate its business by standing orders, as well as the freedom from civil or criminal proceedings for words spoken or written by Members before their respective House.

The ability of Parliament to enact laws is exercised through the passage of bills by the Senate and the House (or, in the circumstances described in sections 54 and 55 of the Constitution, by the House) and the Governor-General's assent on His Majesty's behalf. Any bill other than a money bill may be introduced in either House of Parliament; a money bill cannot be introduced in the Senate. The Governor-General must formally indicate his assent to a measure when it is submitted to him for his signature in conformity with the Constitution. A bill becomes law after receiving the Governor-General's approval and is then published as law in the Official Gazette by the Clerk of the House. This is done in accordance with the requirements of the Constitution. However, Parliament has the authority to postpone the implementation of any such law until after it has been published in the Official Gazette.

Parliament takes decisions relating to:

- the opening of Parliament in recourse to a call before His Majesty or his representative (except for cases provided for in the Constitution);
- the composition and powers of the local Council of Barbuda;
- arrangements governing the local government of this constituency.

== Sessions of parliament ==
Each session of Parliament shall be held in the location and at the time designated by the Governor-General by proclamation, but not later than six months after the conclusion of the previous session if it has been prorogued or four months after the conclusion of that session if it has been dissolved. During any session of the Parliament, not more than three months may pass between sessions. Subject to this restriction, the sessions of the Parliament shall be held at such time and place as the Parliament may, by its rules of procedure or otherwise, determine.

== Dissolution of parliament ==
The Governor-General may prorogue or dissolve Parliament at any time while acting in line with the advice of the Prime Minister, subject to the restrictions of paragraph (5) of section 60. Subject to the provisions of subsection (3) of section 60, Parliament shall not be dissolved until five years have passed since the date of its first session following any dissolution. Parliament may, at any time when His Majesty is at war, extend the five-year period mentioned in subsection (2) of section 60 for no more than twelve months at a time; however, the life of Parliament may not be prolonged under this paragraph for a duration exceeding five years. When an emergency occurs between the dissolution of Parliament and the subsequent general election of members to the House that, in the Prime Minister's opinion, necessitates calling the two Houses before the general election can be held, the Governor-General, acting on the advice of the Prime Minister, may call the two Houses of the previous Parliament; however, the election of members of the House shall proceed and the general election shall be held as scheduled. If a resolution declaring lack of confidence in the government is passed by a majority of the House members and the Prime Minister does not resign from office or recommend a dissolution of Parliament within seven days of the resolution's passage, the Governor-General may, at his discretion, dissolve Parliament.

== Composition and membership ==
Parliament has two chambers. The House of Representatives has 19 members, 17 members elected for a five year term in single-seat constituencies, 1 ex-officio member and 1 Speaker. The Senate has 17 appointed members.

No civil or criminal proceedings may be brought against any member of either House of Parliament for remarks made before, or written in a report to, the House of Parliament. This is without prejudice to any provision made by Parliament regarding the powers, privileges, and immunities of Parliament and its committees, or the privileges and immunities of the members and officers of either House of Parliament and of other people involved in the business of Parliament or its committees.

== See also ==
- Constitution of Antigua and Barbuda
- Politics of Antigua and Barbuda
- Supreme Audit Institution of Antigua and Barbuda
- List of legislatures by country
