= House of Representatives (Antigua and Barbuda) =

Lower house of the Parliament of Antigua and Barbuda

Coordinates: 17°07′04″N 61°50′00″W

- 17th legislature

Type
- Type: Lower House of the Parliament of Antigua and Barbuda
- Established: 27 February 1967

Leadership
- Speaker: Osbert Frederick
- Deputy Speaker: Philmore Benjamin

Structure
- Seats: 17
- Political groups: His Majesty's Government (15): Labour (15); Opposition (2): UPP (1); BPM (1)
- Length of term: 5 years

Elections
- Voting system: First-past-the-post
- Last election: 30 April 2026

Meeting place
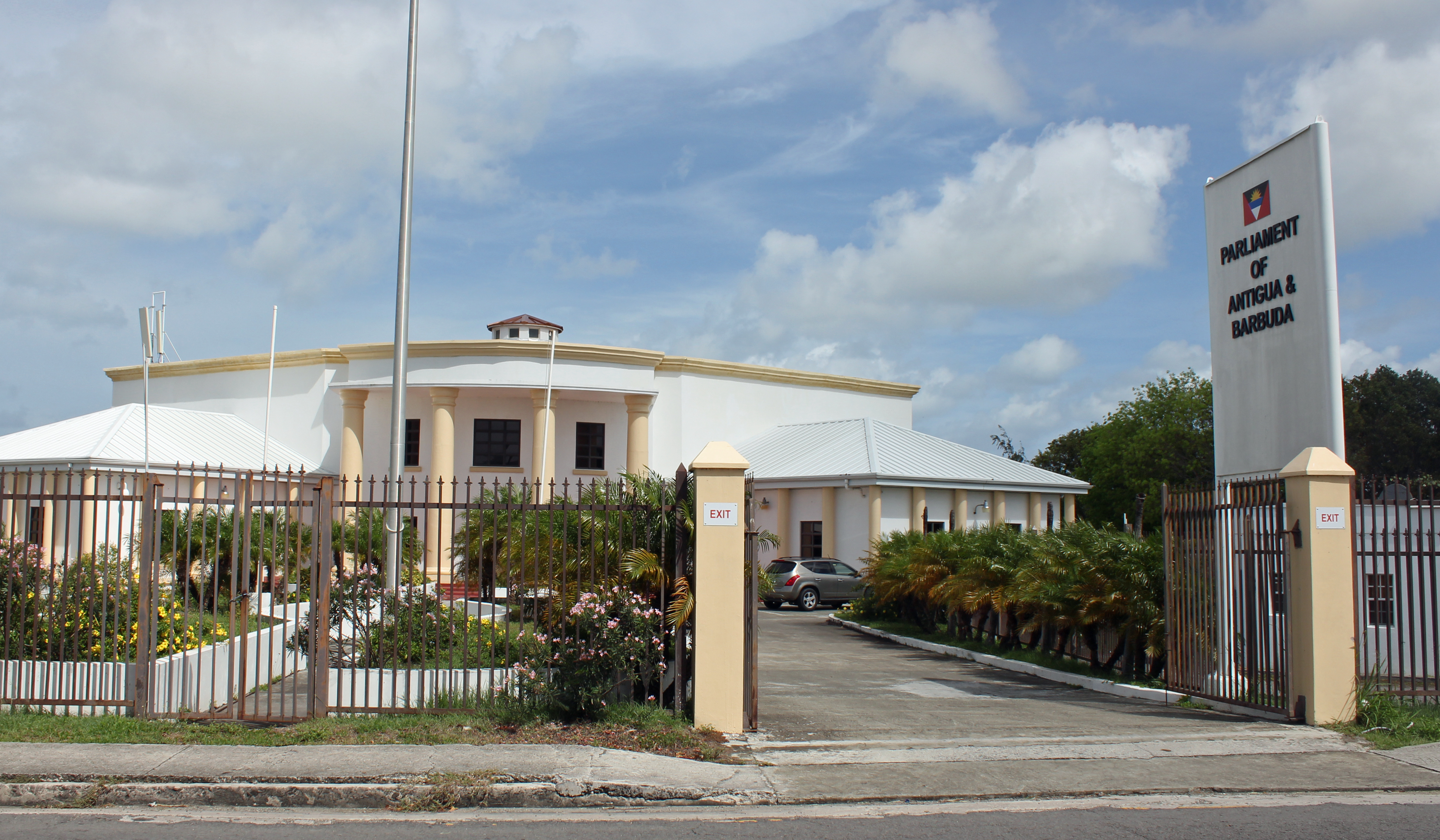
- Antigua and Barbuda Parliament Building, St. John's

The House of Representatives (Spanish: Cámara de Representantes; Antiguan and Barbudan Creole: Haas a Reeprizentatif dem) is the lower chamber of the country's bicameral parliament. Each of the constituencies created in accordance with section 62 of the Constitution shall elect one representative to the House in a direct election in accordance with the procedures specified by or pursuant to any law, subject to the rules of the Constitution. Unless he is prohibited by law from registration as a voter for the purpose of electing a member of the House, every Commonwealth citizen who is eighteen years of age or older and who meets the requirements relating to residence or domicile in Antigua and Barbuda as prescribed by Parliament is entitled to be registered as such a voter in accordance with the provisions of any law in that regard, and no other person may be registered. Every person who is registered to vote in any constituency shall, unless prohibited from doing so by any law, be entitled to vote in accordance with the provisions of any law in that regard in any election of members of the House in that constituency. Voting is free and must be done by secret ballot in accordance with any rules that Parliament may impose during House member elections.

A clerk for the Senate and a clerk for the House are required, but one person may hold both positions. The positions of the clerks of each House of Parliament and the members of their staff are public posts, subject to any laws passed by Parliament. The High Court has the authority to hear and rule on any disputes regarding who was duly elected as a member of the House, who was duly appointed as a Senator or as a temporary member of the Senate, who was duly elected as Speaker from among non-House members and who has vacated the office of Speaker, or who has left his or her seat in the House and is required by the preamble to do so. Any person who is eligible to vote in the election to which the application relates, any person who was a candidate at that election, or the Attorney General may file an application with the High Court for the resolution of any question under subsection (1)(a) of section 44. Any member of the House, the Attorney General, or, in the case of a member of the House's seat, any person registered as a voter in some constituency for the purpose of electing members of the House, may file an application with the High Court for the resolution of any issue under subsection (1)(d) of section 44.

Any person who participates in either House of Parliament's deliberations while knowing or having a good faith belief that they are ineligible to do so is guilty of an offense and subject to a fine of up to $500 or another amount set by the legislature for each day they participate. Any prosecution for an offense under this section must be brought in the High Court, and only the Director of Public Prosecutions may do so.

A money bill may not be filed in the Senate, however other bills may be introduced in either House of Parliament. Unless on the recommendation of a Minister who has been given permission by the Cabinet to do so, neither House may consider a measure (or any change to a law) that, in the opinion of the person in charge, includes provisions for any of the following: for the imposition of taxes or their alteration other than by reduction; for the imposition of any charges against the Consolidated Fund or any other public fund of Antigua and Barbuda or their alteration other than by reduction; for the payment, issue, or withdrawal of any funds not charged thereon from the Consolidated Fund or any other public fund of Antigua and Barbuda or any increase in the amount of such payment, issue, or withdrawal. Any motion (including an amendment to a motion) that, in the view of the person in charge, would have the effect of making provision for any of those purposes shall not be considered by either house.

== Composition ==
The current House of Representatives has a total of 19 members. Seventeen members are directly elected to five-year terms from single member constituencies using the first-past-the-post system. There is one ex officio member (the attorney-general) and the remaining seat is held by the Speaker. The House shall consist of as many elected members as the number of constituencies from time to time established by Order under Part 4 of Chapter III, subject to the provisions of section 36 of the constitution. Members of the House shall be chosen in accordance with any procedure that may be prescribed by or pursuant to any Act of Parliament, subject to the provisions of the Constitution. The Speaker, if not already a member of the House, automatically becomes a member. Likewise, the Attorney-General, if not already a member of the House, becomes a member by virtue of holding or performing that duty, but is unable able to cast a vote in the House.

=== Membership ===
Parliament was last elected in 2026.

Affiliation	Members
Antigua and Barbuda Labour Party	15
United Progressive Party	1
Barbuda People's Movement	1
Total	17

== See also ==
- Senate of Antigua and Barbuda – the upper chamber of Parliament
- History of Antigua and Barbuda
- List of national legislatures
- Speaker of the House of Representatives of Antigua and Barbuda
