= United Progressive Party =

Centre-left political party in Antigua and Barbuda

United Progressive Party Yuunaitid Pragresif Paatee
- Abbreviation: UPP
- Leader: Jamale Pringle
- Deputy Leader: Sherfield Bowen
- Chairperson: Giselle Isaac-Arrindell
- Founder: Baldwin Spencer
- Founded: April 11, 1992; 34 years ago
- Merger of: ACLM; PLM; UNDP
- Headquarters: Belmont
- Youth wing: Progressive Youth
- Ideology: Social democracy Anti-corruption; Republicanism; Decentralisation
- Political position: Centre-left
- Colours: Blue and gold
- Slogan: People First
- Seats in the House of Representatives: 1 / 17
- Seats in the Senate: 4 / 17

Election symbol

Website
- www.myupp.org

The United Progressive Party (UPP) (Note: Antiguan and Barbudan Creole: Yuunaitid Pragresif Paatee [juːnaɪtɪd pɹägɹɛsɪf päːtiː]) is a political party in Antigua and Barbuda. It has been one of the two major parties in the country (along with the Antigua and Barbuda Labour Party) since its first election in 1994. It is usually identified as centre-left. The party receives most of its support from suburban and rural Antiguan voters in the Central Plain and around the Shekerley Mountains. The party is allied with the Barbuda People's Movement and thus does not field candidates on Barbuda.

The party traces its origins to the Antigua Caribbean Liberation Movement (ACLM), the Progressive Labour Movement (PLM) and the United National Democratic Party (UNDP). Prior to the rise of the UPP, the Progressive Labour Movement, previously the main opposition party, had been in crisis for several years. The party had been subject to unfair electoral conditions and a rising threat from the UNDP. The ACLM was a minor socialist opposition party led by Tim Hector, backed by the Communist Party of Cuba and formerly by the New JEWEL Movement in Grenada. The UNDP, led by Baldwin Spencer, received a third of the votes in 1989, and won one seat.

The UPP was formed by merging those three parties on 11 April 1992, prior to the general election in 1994. Spencer was selected as leader, and campaigned on government transparency and the failures of the Bird family–dominated government. The party won five seats in 1994 and over 40% of the popular vote. The ABLP's leader Lester Bird consolidated power throughout the 1990s, eventually establishing a de facto one-party state, condemned by Freedom House as one of five non-electoral democracies in the Americas. Under this system, the UPP was subject to media censorship and electoral interference.

Following condemnation from various international institutions, including the Commonwealth of Nations, Bird's government established the Antigua and Barbuda Electoral Commission in 2001, paving the way for the first free elections in multiple decades in 2004. These elections were won by the UPP, with Spencer being elected as the first opposition prime minister since independence. Spencer campaigned on transparency, anti-corruption, infrastructural improvements, and decentralisation. His premiership improved the country's reputation overseas, and the party won the 2009 election as well. Fallout from the arrest of Allen Stanford and the global financial crisis contributed to the party's loss in 2014.

The party has been in opposition since 2014. Harold Lovell was elected leader of the party in 2015, and under his tenure the party suffered a landslide loss in 2018, with Jamale Pringle winning the sole seat. However, discontent with the government following numerous corruption scandals, tensions in Barbuda, and the aftermath of the COVID-19 pandemic caused the party to nearly return to government in 2023. Lovell resigned on 20 January 2023 following the slim loss, with Pringle being elected leader of the party on 21 April 2024. While the Alfa Nero scandal initially proved beneficial for the UPP's popularity, an ensuing credibility crisis caused by discontent with Pringle's leadership and consecutive by-election losses resulted in major resignations, most notably that of MP Anthony Smith in the prelude to the 2026 general election, a landslide loss for the party.

== History ==
=== Formation (1992–2004) ===
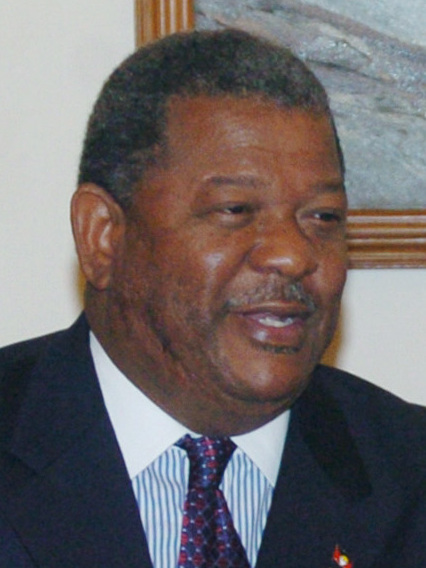
Baldwin Spencer led the party to victory in 2004 and 2009

Results of the 2004 general election

The United Progressive Party was formed on 11 April 1992 through a merger of three parties, namely the Antigua Caribbean Liberation Movement, the Progressive Labour Movement and the United National Democratic Party. Each party was in opposition to the Antigua Labour Party government. Baldwin Spencer was chosen to lead the new party. Prior to the establishment of the party, the only party in the country's history to have ever held government was the PLM between 1971 and 1976. The PLM slowly lost its popularity after its loss of governing status, due to various corruption scandals and the dominance of Vere Bird. The ACLM was a minor party led by Tim Hector, who was backed by various communist parties in the region and subject to political rights violations including the raiding of its newspaper Outlet in 1982. The UNDP was established in 1986, uniting various factions, mostly those that had been expelled from the PLM. The UNDP was the most popular of the three parties electorally by 1989.

Following the merger, the party contested its first election in 1994. This took place at a time when the Labour Party's credibility was under high scrutiny– this was the first election where Vere Bird's son, Lester Bird, was the party leader. The party won 43% of the vote and 5 seats in the House of Representatives. These elections were neither free nor fair and were a major turning point in the country's process of democratic backsliding. The party ultimately accepted the result, satisfied with its newfound status as the official opposition. Lester Bird continued to consolidate power throughout the 1990s, being accused of severe corruption and authoritarianism. Supporters of the party were subject to police intimidation and censorship. Bird ultimately committed fraud during the 1999 election, with the UPP apparently losing one seat. The country faced intense international scrutiny, and the party refused to accept the election results. Many reports stated that the UPP would have won the election had it been free and fair. Spencer led a hunger strike, and pressure from the Commonwealth of Nations and the international community resulted in Bird's government establishing the Antigua and Barbuda Electoral Commission in 2001.

The party's 2004 manifesto revolved around anti-corruption and government transparency. Other major promises included the establishment of a school meals programme, unemployment relief, $1,000 pensions for seniors, and tax exemptions targeting the lower and middle classes. The party also supported the strengthening of the Barbuda Council. The party won a landslide victory in 2004, winning 55.50% of the popular vote and a 12-seat supermajority in Parliament, forming a coalition with the Barbuda People's Movement which won the sole Barbuda seat in a by-election several weeks later.

=== Government and aftermath (2004–2024) ===
The UPP's government branded itself as "the government in the sunshine". In the aftermath of the election, the UPP primarily focused on economic recovery and government efficiency. During Spencer's first term, the UPP government prevailed in a trade dispute with the United States, was elected to the presidency of the Group of 77, and began construction on major development projects including the Sir Vivian Richards Stadium (in time for the 2007 Cricket World Cup). However, the mounting consequences of the global financial crisis starting in 2008 and the arrest of Allen Stanford caused reduced performance in 2009. The government's management of His Majesty's Prison was also the subject of concern from human rights activists. The government maintained a smaller majority and its coalition with the BPM. In November 2011, ground broke on the new terminal of the V. C. Bird International Airport, considered to be the most modern airport in the region, eventually opening in August 2015. In 2013, the Citizenship by Investment Programme was established, intended to supplement government revenues following the financial crisis. However, these efforts were futile, and the UPP was swept from power in 2014 by the Labour Party under Gaston Browne, losing six of its seats. Spencer stepped down from party leadership in 2015. A race for his successor began, to be held at the party's biennial convention on 17 May 2015. Harold Lovell and Joanne Massiah were the two major candidates. Lovell, a former member of the ACLM, was the favourite, although Massiah conducted an aggressive campaign before withdrawing, eventually forming the Democratic National Alliance (DNA) following her later expulsion from the party.

The UPP suffered further losses in the 2018 snap election following Hurricane Irma, with Lovell unable to win his seat and its share of the popular vote being reduced to 37.09%. Jamale Pringle won the UPP's sole seat, All Saints East and Saint Luke, a historic safe constituency. Later in 2018, the UPP opposed a major judicial reform, which was successfully blocked by referendum. In 2020, a recession began in the country due to the COVID-19 pandemic, and that same year longtime MP Asot Michael was expelled from the Labour government due to corruption concerns. This allowed for the UPP to win 45.22% of the popular vote and six seats in Parliament in the 2023 election, although Lovell lost his seat by several votes, with some accusing the DNA of spoling said vote. Lovell eventually resigned two days later with Pringle easily becoming the party leader and Sherfield Bowen his deputy. Following the election, a legal dispute resulted in the UPP prevailing in the 2023 St. Mary's South by-election. An alliance known as the People's Parliament was established with Michael, although this was short-lived due to Michael's assassination in November 2024. Around this time, concerns about the abandoned Alfa Nero superyacht turned public opinion against Browne's administration.

=== Credibility crisis (2024–present) ===
On 15 July 2024, Anthony Smith resigned from the UPP due to concerns about the party leadership. Giselle Isaac-Arrindell, chair of the party, was criticized in his resignation letter along with Pringle, and Smith moved to sit as an independent member in parliament. These concerns were exacerbated by the 2025 St. Peter by-election, where the Labour Party easily won about three quarters of the vote. Many called for Isaac to resign following these events. Another landslide by-election loss in March 2026 resulted in calls for Pringle to resign the party leadership as well, and recommendations for the Labour Party to call a general election due to increased public opinion. Browne's government announced a general election a few days later, with Lovell (now running against Smith) dismissing calls for an early convention. Following the April 2026 general election, the party lost all but one of its seats in parliament and concerns about the party's future were amplified.

== Ideology and principles ==
=== Barbuda ===
The party supports the original Barbuda Land Act, and has proposed establishing a Joint Consultative Committee composed of "experienced leaders" to oversee development projects on the island. The party has also proposed making Barbuda a renewable energy exporter, and supports converting the island into a duty free economy. The party also supports obtaining a dedicated coast guard vessel to patrol the island's waters. The party does not field candidates in Barbuda and instead has a coalition with the Barbuda People's Movement.

=== Economy ===
In the subject of energy, United Progressive Party supports incentivising more solar power investments and introducing a "No More Oil Policy" to forbid the establishment of new oil-based power plants. The party supports maintaining the consumption tax on gasoline and diesel fuel, and ending all taxes on the importation of electric vehicles.

In financial management, the party supports lowering corporate income tax from 25% to 15%, and removing all sales tax from locally-produced products. The party also supports abolishing entertainment taxes, unincorporated business taxes, and requiring that all investment projects give Antiguan and Barbudan residents first preference in employment. Additionally, the party supports restructuring the Antigua and Barbuda Investment Authority. The party also wishes to regulate the activities of government ministers in business. In the topic of real estate, the party supports abolishing the stamp duty for first-time home buyers.

In e-government, the party supports a national ID to access online government services, and supports the establishment of online voting.

=== Education ===
The party supports free pre-school education and requiring the government to cover the costs of at least five CXC examinations for students. The party also supports the establishment of a national educational institution for those with autism. The party also supports establishing a special institution for aviation technology, as well as emphasizing STEM and artificial intelligence in education. The party wishes to foster "appreciation for [the] history and legacy of Antigua and Barbuda" in education.

=== Health ===
The party has proposed constructing new polyclinics and creating a new mental health facility, as well as an additional non-residential facility for "at-risk" youth. The party wishes to create a nationwide set of standards on instructing teachers on how to deal with students' mental health. The party also supports free dental and eye care for persons under eighteen, creating a "medical air-bridge" between Antigua and Barbuda, and improving the quality of parental leave. The party also supports increasing the minimum amount of cannabis for personal consumption to 1 ounce.

=== Judiciary and national security ===
The party wishes to rename the Royal Police Force to the Antigua and Barbuda Police Service, establishing a small claims court, and re-establishing the village magistrates' courts. The party also supports establishing a Service Corps in the Antigua and Barbuda Defence Force.

In the topic of immigration, the party supports granting citizenship to anyone with an Antiguan and Barbudan great-grandparent. The party also supports the establishment of a Department of Immigrant Affairs and an Immigration Affairs Tribunal. The party supports fast-track citizenship for illegal immigrants who came to the country as children. The party also supports establishing a Ministry of Diaspora Affairs.

=== Social development ===
In the subject of youth, the party supports mandatory student councils in secondary schools and the establishment of a National Youth Council. Additionally, the party supports the establishment of a National Service Corps that would enlist youth to complete various community service operations across the country.

In the subject of crime, the party wishes to abolish bonding and replace it with an obligation to serve in a proposed "National Service Corps". The party wishes to establish Friday and Saturday classes for the country's recommended inmates. The party is against detention of youths who have committed petty crimes.

== Electoral results ==
Results of the 2026 general election

Election	Party leader	Votes	%	Seats	+/–	Position	Government
1994	Baldwin Spencer	11,852	43.7	5 / 17	New	2nd	Opposition
1999	Baldwin Spencer	14,713	44.5	4 / 17	▼1	2nd	Opposition
2004	Baldwin Spencer	21,892	55.5	12 / 17	▲8	▲1st	Majority
2009	Baldwin Spencer	21,239	50.7	9 / 17	▼3	1st	Majority
2014	Baldwin Spencer	17,994	42.0	3 / 17	▼6	▼2nd	Opposition
2018	Harold Lovell	14,440	37.1	1 / 17	▼2	2nd	Opposition
2023	Harold Lovell	19,207	45.2	6 / 17	▲5	2nd	Opposition
2026	Jamale Pringle	14,614	37.3	1 / 17	▼5	2nd	Opposition
