= Senate (Antigua and Barbuda) =

Upper house of Parliament of Antigua and Barbuda

Coordinates: 17°07′04″N 61°50′00″W

- 17th legislature

Type
- Type: Upper house of the Parliament of Antigua and Barbuda
- Term limits: None
- Established: 27 February 1967

Leadership
- President: Alincia Williams-Grant since 25 June 2014
- Deputy President: Philip Shoul since 5 March 2025

Structure
- Seats: 17
- Political groups: Government Senators: Labour (11); Opposition Senators: UPP (4); BPM (1); Independent Senators: Independent (1)
- Length of term: 5 years

Elections
- Voting system: Appointment by the Governor-General

Meeting place
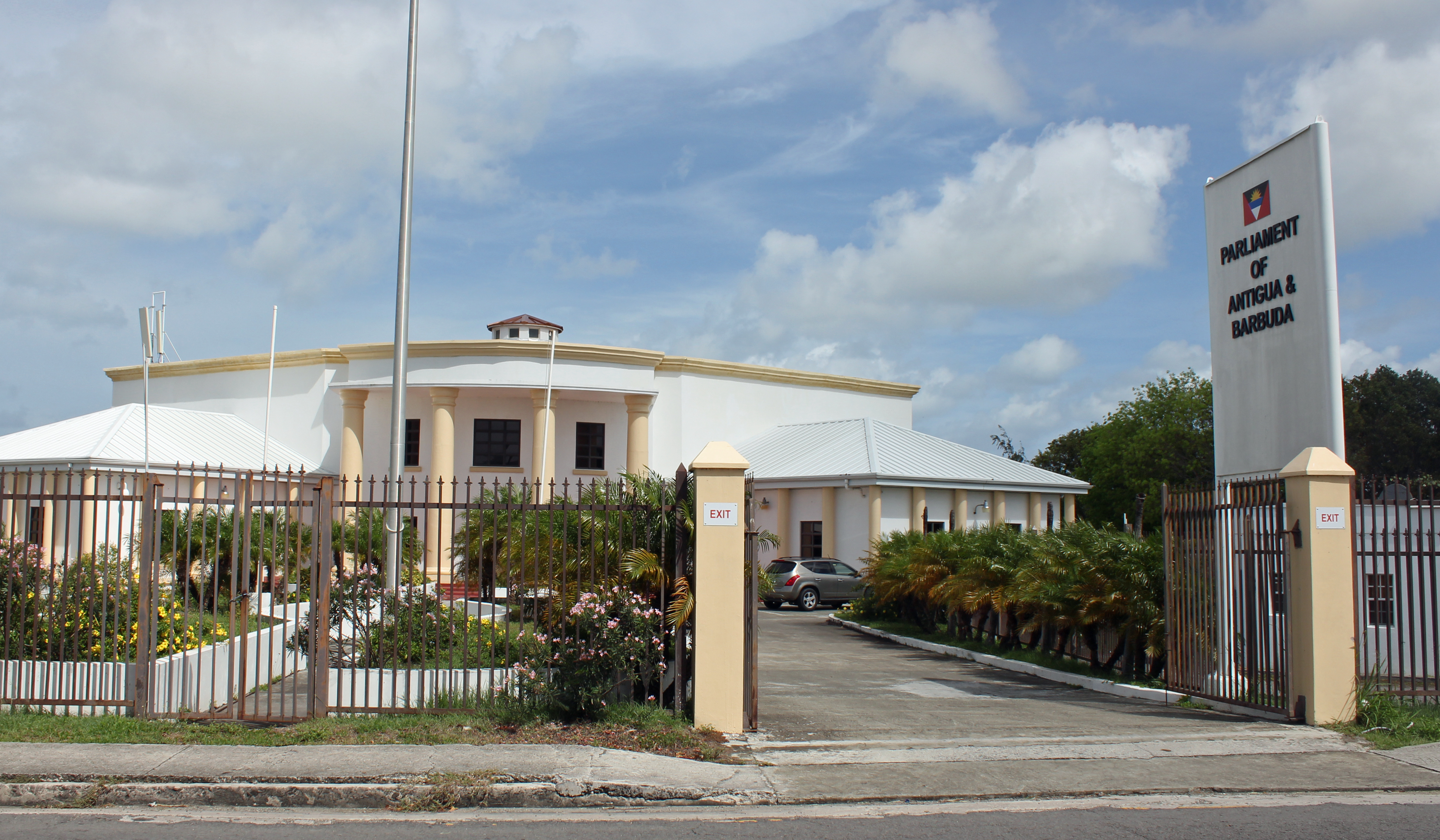

Website
- ab.gov.ag/detail_page.php?page=9

The Senate (Spanish: Senado; Antiguan and Barbudan Creole: Senit) is the upper house of the Parliament of Antigua and Barbuda. The Senate and the lower chamber, the House of Representatives, together form the bicameral legislature of Antigua and Barbuda. The Senate and the House together may make laws for "the peace, order and good government of Antigua and Barbuda". Any bill other than a money bill may be introduced in the Senate.

The composition and powers of the Senate are established under sections 28 to 35 of the Constitution. The Senate is composed of seventeen members appointed by the Governor-General. Ten members are appointed on the advice of the Prime Minister, four on the advice of the Leader of the Opposition, one on the advice of the Barbuda Council, one resident of Barbuda on the advice of the Prime Minister, and one at the Governor-General's discretion.

The current President of the Senate is Senator the Hon. Alincia Williams-Grant.

== Membership ==
=== Eligibility ===
Subject to the provisions of Section 30 of the Constitution, any person who at the time of his appointment: is a citizen; is twenty-one years of age or older; has lived in Antigua and Barbuda for the twelve months immediately prior to the date of his appointment; and is able to speak and, unless disabled by blindness or another physical condition, to read the English language with enough proficiency to allow him to take an active part in the proceedings.

=== Ineligibility ===
Every Senator must resign from the Senate in the following situations: at the next dissolution of Parliament after being appointed; if he is nominated with his consent to run for the House of Representatives; if he loses citizenship; if he is absent from Senate proceedings for the period or periods and under the conditions specified by the Senate's rules of procedure; if any circumstances arise that, if he were not a Senator, would make him ineligible for appointment as such under subsection (1) of section 30 of the Constitution or under any law passed in accordance with subsection (2) of that section, subject to the provisions of subsection (2) of section 31; if the Governor-General, acting in accordance with the advice of the Prime Minister in the case of a Senator appointed pursuant to that advice, the Leader of the Opposition in the case of a Senator appointed pursuant to that advice, the Barbuda Council in the case of a Senator appointed pursuant to that advice, or in his discretion in the case of a Senator appointed by him in his discretion; or if after being appointed in accordance with section 28(6) of the Constitution, he no longer resides in Barbuda.

=== Temporary senators ===
The Governor-General can appoint a temporary Senator if a Senator cannot do their job because they are ill, suspended, or away from Antigua and Barbuda. This temporary member must meet the same qualifications as a permanent Senator.

Temporary senators follow the same constitutional rules as an elected senator and serve until the Governor-General notifies the temporary senator that the circumstances leading to the appointment ceased to exist.

== Senators ==
The Senate was last appointed following the 2026 Antiguan general election.

Affiliation	Members
Antigua and Barbuda Labour Party	11
United Progressive Party	4
Barbuda People's Movement	1
Independent	1
Total	17

== See also ==
- President of the Senate of Antigua and Barbuda
- Parliament of Antigua and Barbuda
- Politics of Antigua and Barbuda
- House of Representatives of Antigua and Barbuda
- List of legislatures by country
