= Barbuda crisis =

Socioeconomic and political conjuncture in Barbuda (2017–present)

- Part of the Barbudan independence movement and the aftermath of Hurricane Irma
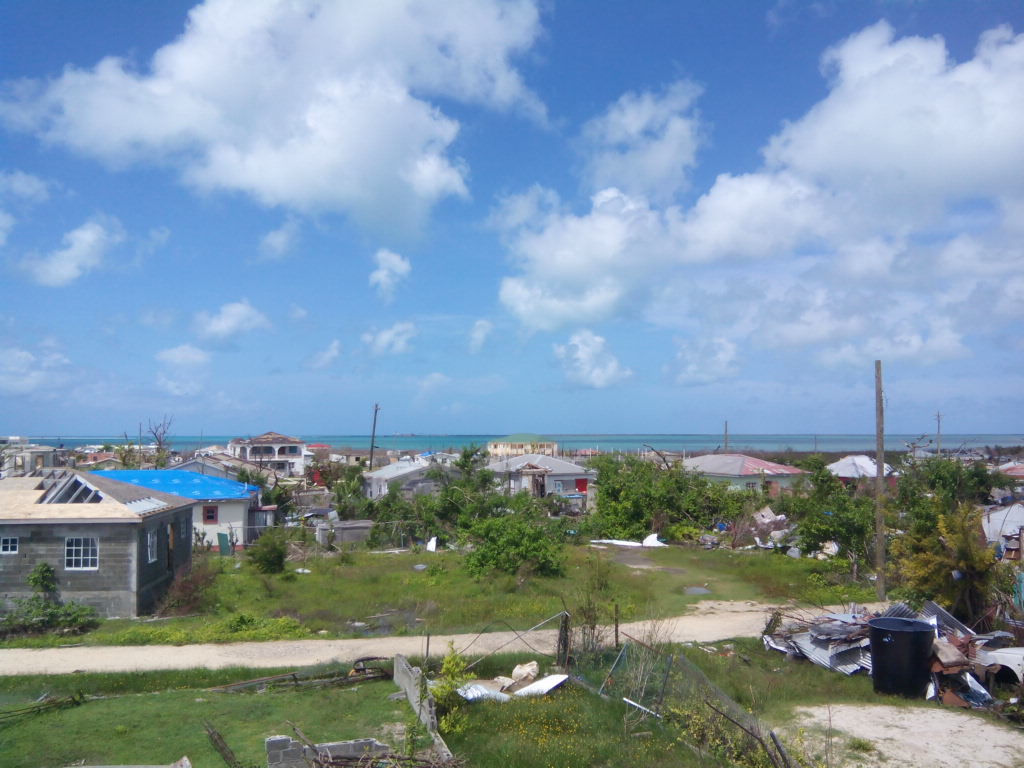
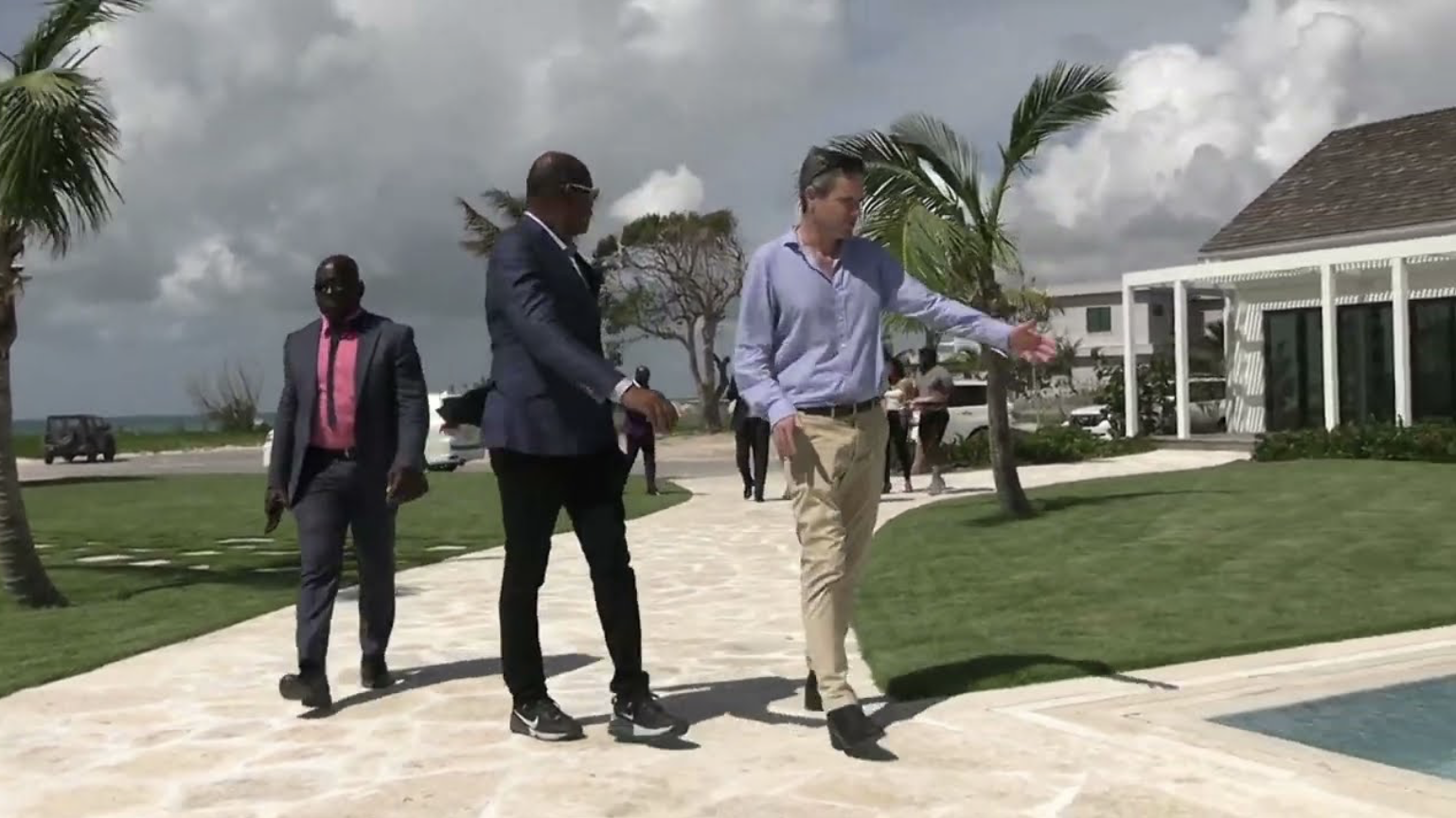
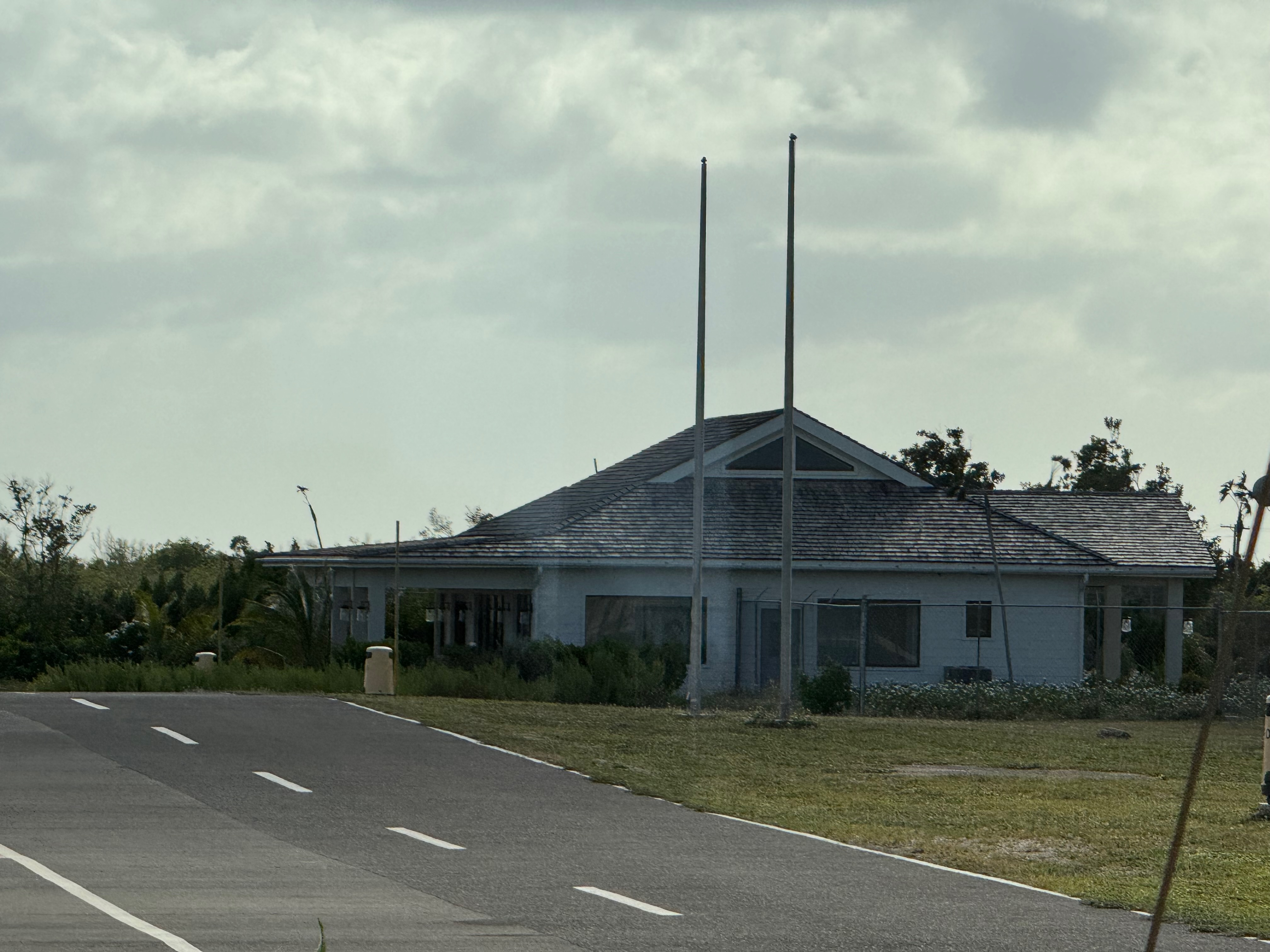
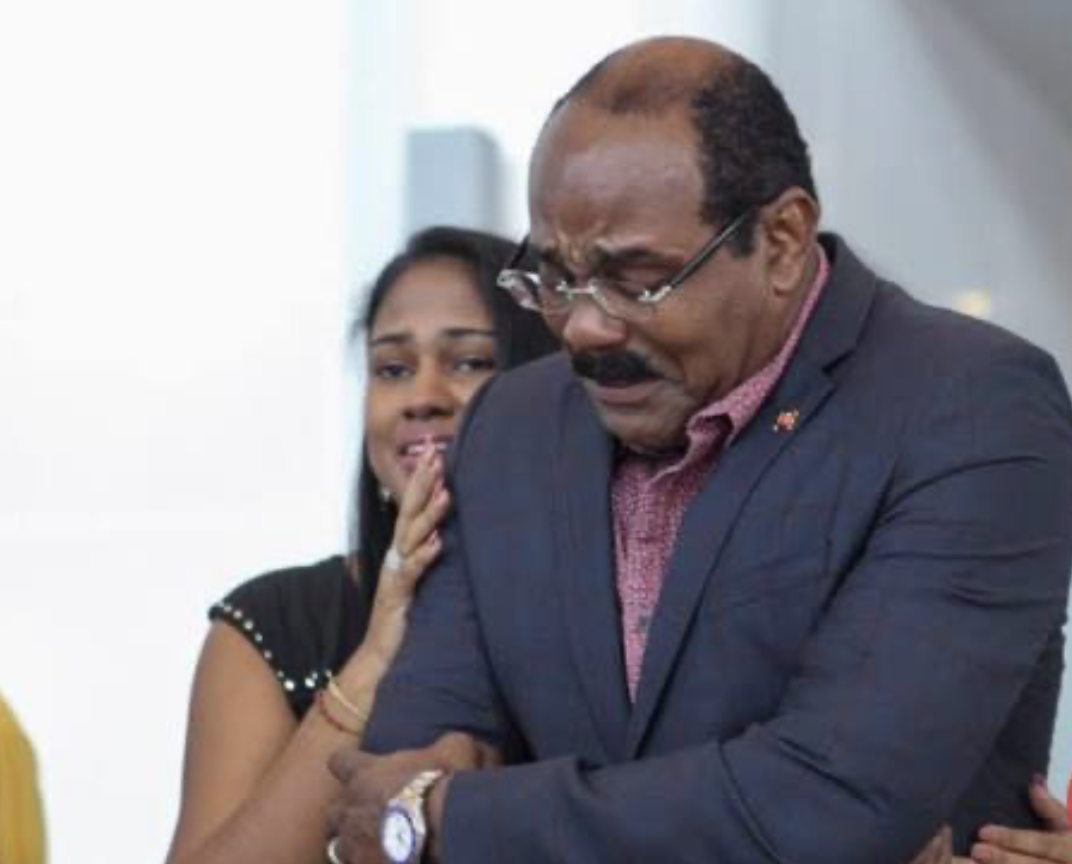
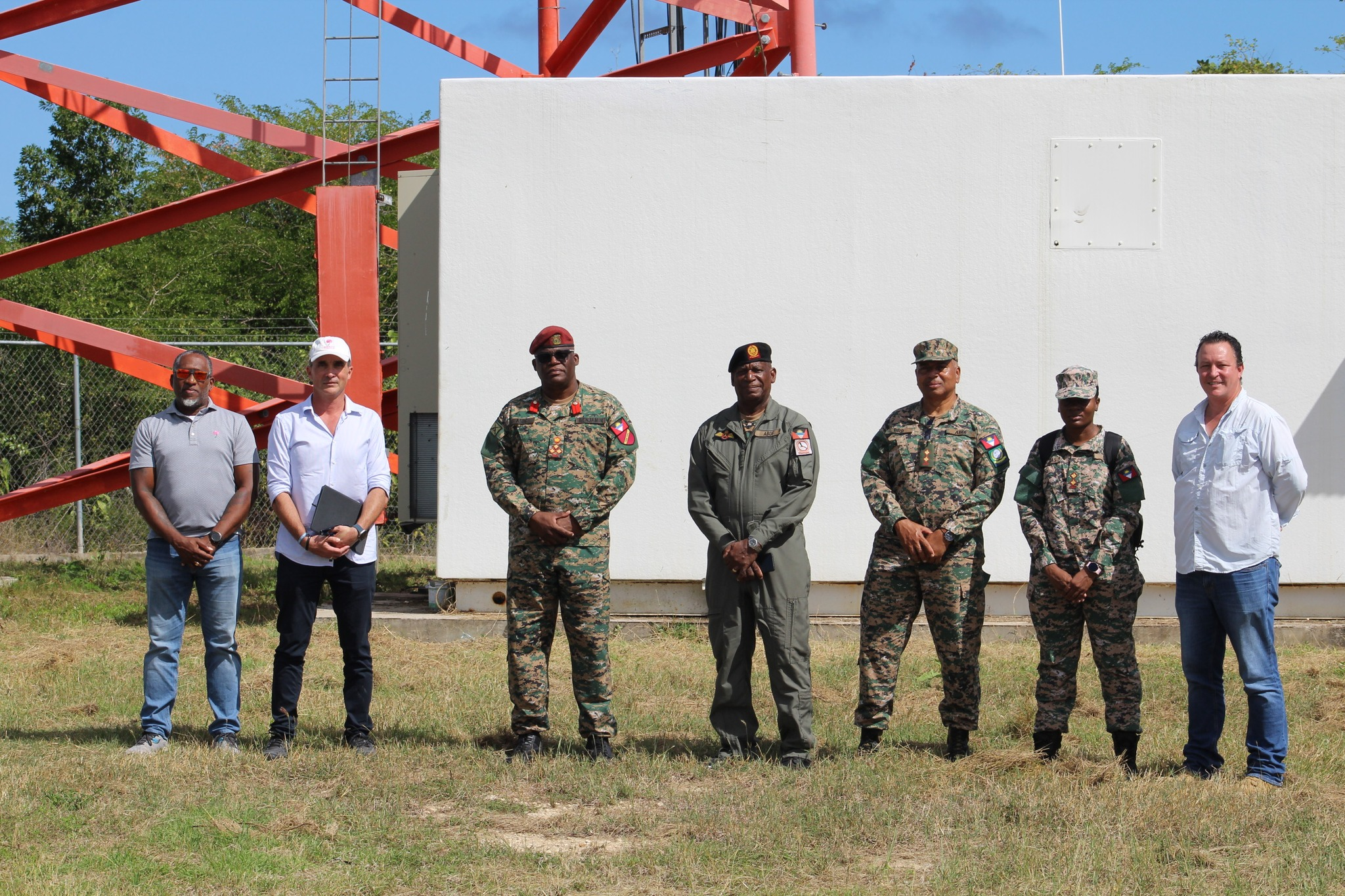
- From left to right, top to bottom: Destruction in Codrington following Hurricane Irma; Browne touring the Barbuda Ocean Club; Private jet terminal at the new Burton–Nibbs International Airport; Gaston Browne crying after reading a letter from an evacuated Barbudan child; Military exercise on Barbuda
- Date: September 6, 2017 – present (9 years, 1 month and 1 week)
- Location: Barbuda
- Caused by: Hurricane Irma; Anti-Barbudan sentiment
- Status: Ongoing: Barbudan refugees flee to Antigua following Irma; Barbuda Land Act heavily amended; Non-Barbudan settlements commence construction; Labour Party loses representation on council; Armed riot squads deployed to Barbuda

Parties
| Government of Antigua and Barbuda: Royal Police Force; Defence Force; Labour Party | (Antigua and Barbuda) Barbuda Council: Barbuda People's Movement |

Lead figures
| Gaston Browne; Steadroy Benjamin; Kendra Beazer; Arthur Nibbs; Knacyntar Nedd | Trevor Walker; John Mussington; Jacklyn Frank; Mackenzie Frank; Fabian Jones |

The Barbuda crisis began on 6 September 2017 following the passing of Hurricane Irma directly over the island, destroying over 90% of Barbuda's infrastructure. Following this, all of Barbuda's population was evacuated from the island, and construction on an international airport and a resort in Palmetto Point commenced in 2018. After early elections were called in March 2018, the separatist Barbuda People's Movement (BPM) returned to Parliament, starting a series of political landslides for the party that continued into the 2026 general election and saw the governing Labour Party lose all representation on the Barbuda Council.

For most of Barbudan history, the islands have had a tumultuous relationship. In 1967, the Associated State of Antigua was established, which was composed of the modern territory of Antigua and Barbuda. This associated state was established to aid the islands' impending independence. When independence negotiations eventually began in the early 1980s, Barbudan delegations sought the separation of the island from Antigua, either as an independent sovereign state or as a separate British colony. A revolution on nearby Anguilla resulted in its separation from the associated state of Saint Kitts-Nevis-Anguilla, and fears of a similar revolution continued to be discussed on the British side up to the very end of the negotiations. Even following Antigua and Barbuda's independence in 1981, separatism remained an important ideology on the island. From 2004 to 2014, the Barbuda People's Movement was included as part of a national coalition government, during which ties between the islands reached their modern peak and the Barbudan communal land system was enshrined into law.

In 2014, Gaston Browne was elected prime minister as part of the Labour Party, promising to transform Barbuda into the country's "breadbasket". The Labour Party on Barbuda, led by Arthur Nibbs, narrowly held control over the island's local government, winning Barbuda's seat in parliament by one vote in that election. However, following the passing of Irma, the Labour Party changed its development strategy on the island, promising to build "Jumby Bay on steroids". As part of this strategy, several luxury developments have been proposed, including the Barbuda Ocean Club and the Robert De Niro-backed Nobu Beach Club. To encourage investment, the government also announced its intention to abolish the communal land system on the island, that currently restricts land access to people of Barbudan descent with limited exceptions.

Today, this sociopolitical crisis continues to impact all aspects of Barbudan life. Environmental experts have expressed serious concern over new developments that may harm both the landscape and wetlands that help protect the flat island from severe flooding. The crisis has also had economic repercussions: the local government, the island's largest employer, has struggled to pay salaries, and infrastructure continues to be below pre-hurricane standards.

== Background ==
For many years, the Codrington family, which had leased the entire island since the 1680s, opposed unification with Antigua as the existing arrangement provided autonomy for their business interests. However, the emancipation of slaves in 1834 and a series of natural disasters and other crises resulted in the British government approving a merger into the colony of Antigua in 1860. When the Codrington family's lease expired in 1870, Barbudans began to occupy the land in common. The British continued to experiment with various failed leases until the late 1890s, when these projects were abandoned and the Barbuda Ordinance was passed in 1904 providing for the island's governance. In 1915, the Polrosa Affair, caused by tensions between the Antiguan colonial government and Barbudan residents, resulted in a near-abolishment of the communal land system, with this proposal ultimately failing due to a general strike on Barbuda and economic distractions on Antigua.

For the rest of the early twentieth-century, the Antiguan administration largely ignored the island, occasionally engaging in failed agricultural projects and minor infrastructural development initiatives. As the colony of Antigua slowly gained autonomy, Vere Bird, the leader of the elected government, began to show interest in the island. Bird was married to a Barbudan and expressed interest in sand-mining on the island. He also used his children's half-Barbudan ancestry to campaign on the island. Barbuda was granted autonomy in 1976, with the Barbuda Council's competencies expanded in 1981 as part of independence negotiations. Mining did not stimulate the island's economy, and it was not until Gaston Browne's electoral victory in 2014 that development of Barbuda once again entered the limelight. In 2016, amendments to the Barbuda Land Act were passed raising the threshold in which community consent must be given for development projects.

== Humanitarian crisis ==
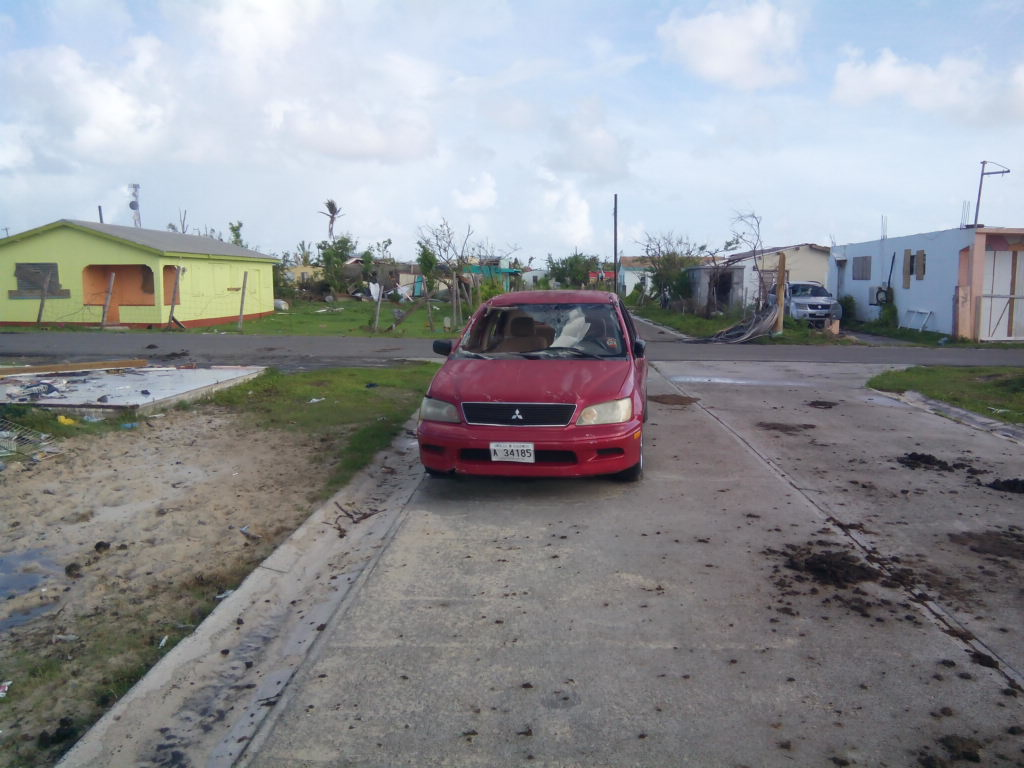
A residential street in Codrington following the direct hit by Hurricane Irma

Immediately following the landfall of Hurricane Irma, there was a humanitarian crisis on Barbuda. Nearly all of the island's infrastructure was damaged or destroyed and with expectations that Hurricane Jose would also hit the island, over a thousand Barbudans were evacuated to Antigua in the following days. One Barbudan, a toddler, died in the hurricane and the scrubland which covered much of the island was damaged by the winds and sea spray. The hospital was also destroyed and there were fears of a disease outbreak on the island.

Resettlement was eventually allowed and Barbudan schools reopened in February 2018.

While the majority of Barbudans were off-island, parliament was dissolved early and Barbudans that had returned were forced to go back to Antigua to vote in the March 2018 election. While the electoral law requires that polling stations be available on Barbuda, voting was conducted exclusively in Antigua. The election resulted in the unseating of Arthur Nibbs and Trevor Walker becoming the island's representative.

By February 2019, most Barbudans had returned to the island, although most infrastructure was still under repair. As of 2024, many Barbudans continue to live in temporary "hurricane homes" funded by the European Union. Some Barbudans have accused the government of misappropriating hurricane relief funds.

== Land reform and post-hurricane recovery ==
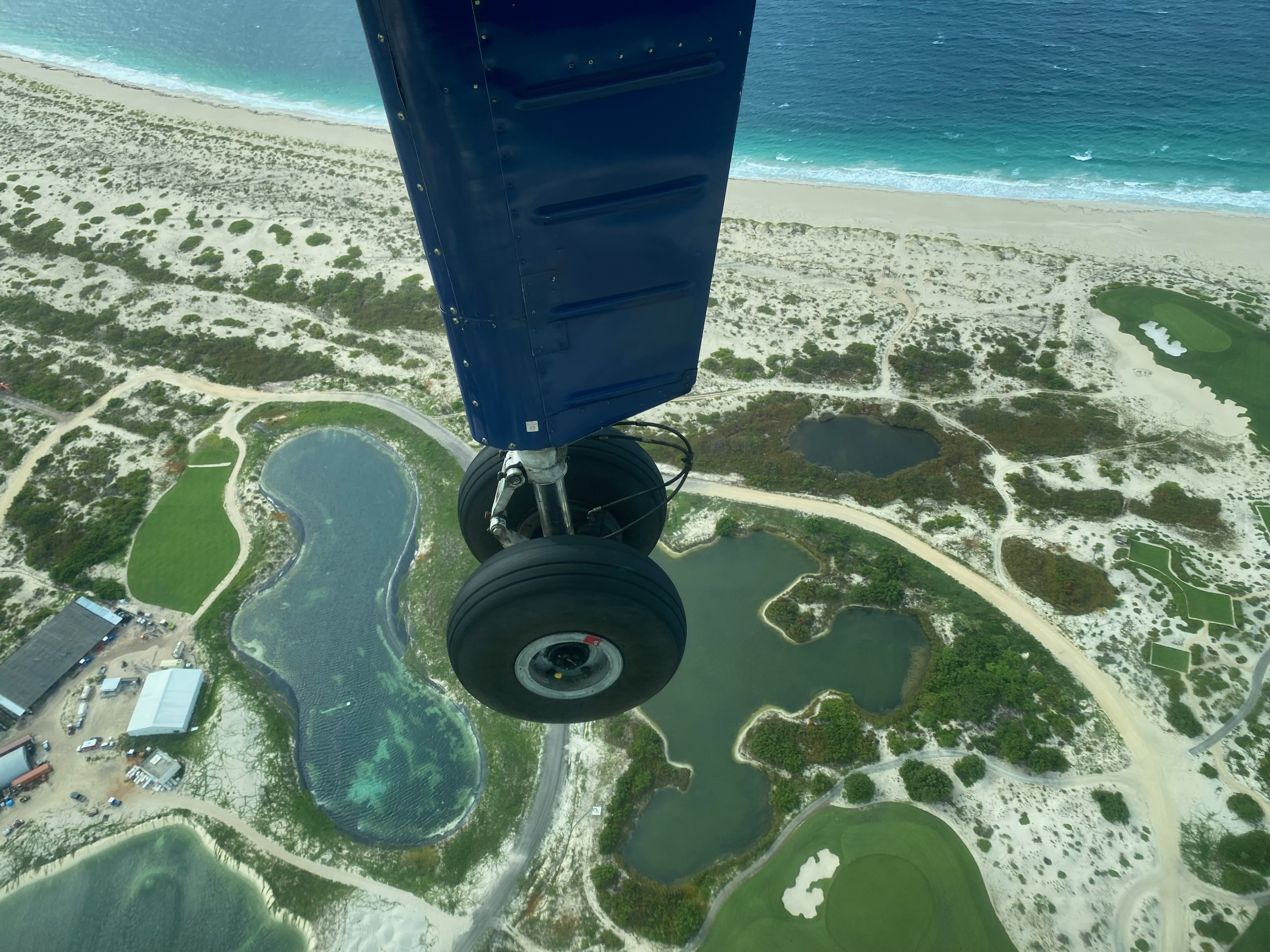
Aerial view of Palmetto Point in 2023

Private property sign at the Barbuda Ocean Club, Coco Point (2026)

As part of his post-Irma development plan, Browne promised to make the island into "Jumby Bay on steroids"– Jumby Bay being a private island catering to the luxury market. In October 2017, construction on an international airport began, that was eventually opened in October 2024. This development caused the destruction of several historical sites, as well as important hunting grounds and the island's last sugar apple grove. There were also several controversial luxury developments proposed. The Barbuda Ocean Club, has two locations on Barbuda's southern coast: one on Palmetto Point and one on Coco Point. The project is backed by the Peace, Love, Happiness (PLH) organisation. PLH intends to construct a gated community including 400 luxury villas on Palmetto Point and a smaller 30-home residential and resort project on Coco Point. As of July 2026, the PLH project is currently subject to a legal dispute between investors John Paul DeJoria and John Turbidy.

The Nobu Beach Club was announced before the hurricane and required direct parliamentary authorisation to proceed, in circumvention of the usual village meeting process. The controversial project is backed by several investors, most notably Robert De Niro. The fifty-four room resort is subject to a ninety-nine year lease and is mostly staffed by local residents. According to the Global Legal Action Network, which is associated with the BPM, all coastal lands on the island are being considered for luxury development.

The Labour Party is in the process of dismantling the communal land system on the island. Currently, all land on the island is owned by the central government. Subject to availability, any Barbudan descendant, regardless of location, is entitled to plots of land to which they have the exclusive right of occupation. Applications for land are handled by the Barbuda Council's land department. In February 2021, the Judicial Committee of the Privy Council (JCPC), the country's highest court, ruled that Barbudans did not have an inherent right to occupy the land in common. In November 2023, the JCPC stated that local residents did have the right to challenge the international airport development and that the court had the authority to revert the airfield to its natural state.

The central government has proposed replacing communal land with a freehold system in which Barbudans may purchase any currently used plots for one dollar. The central government has claimed that under the current system, Barbudans are squatters. On 23 July 2026, Nibbs was named as one of the first people to be sold crown lands under the new system. However, the current Barbudan land system is still subject to litigation between the council and the central government.

To aid housing in Barbuda, China has funded an inland housing development at Louis Hill that is viewed by the Barbuda Council and many Barbudans as a hostile takeover of the area.

== Separatism and political impact ==
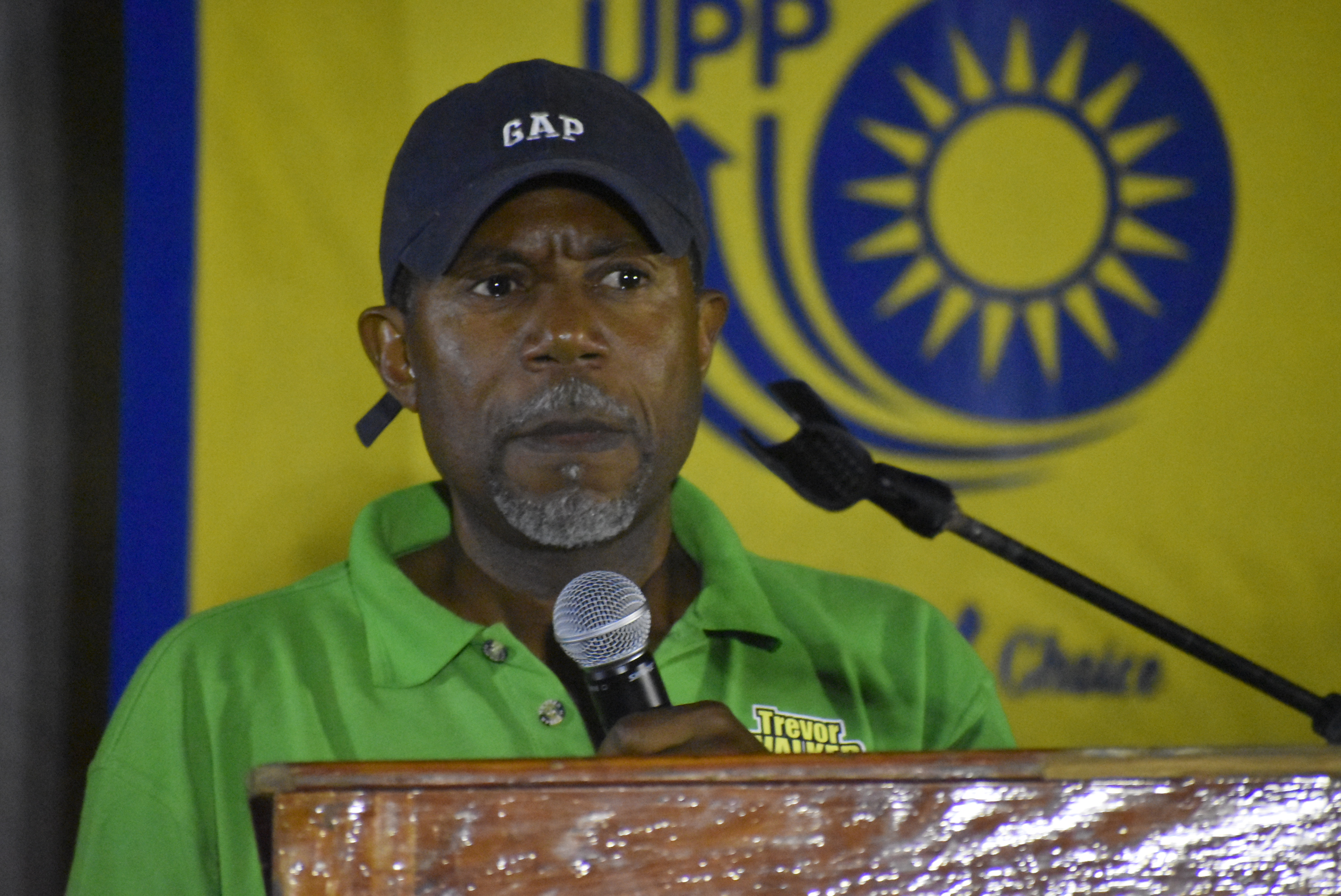
Trevor Walker speaking at a United Progressive Party rally in 2023

On 31 August 2020, the Barbuda Council submitted a formal request to the Cabinet of Antigua and Barbuda to commence discussions on Barbuda's independence from Antigua. Trevor Walker brought a resolution before parliament in September 2020, although it failed due to opposition from both the governing Labour Party and the BPM's main ally on Antigua, the United Progressive Party. Earlier that year, the Barbuda Council had banned outside travel to the island due to the COVID-19 pandemic, which the government deemed to be outside the council's authority.

Browne has also made multiple highly controversial statements about the Barbudan population's genetics, claiming that the Barbudan population was inbred and tasking former health minister Molwyn Joseph with "finding a solution".

Since the start of the crisis, the BPM has won all elections on the island. Four council elections in 2019, 2021, 2023, and 2025 have resulted in the Labour Party losing all of its seats on the council and in the 2026 general election, Walker won over 60% of the constituency's vote.

== Protests ==
There have been several instances of civil unrest in relation to the crisis. In July 2020, council secretary Paul Nedd and future council chairperson Devon Warner were arrested following clashes on River Road with police and PLH employees. Another protest in January 2025 led by Walker resulted in a verbal confrontation between an armed "riot squad" and Barbudan protesters at the Katel Hill site, near Louis Hill to the east of Codrington.
