= List of political parties in Antigua and Barbuda =

This article lists political parties in Antigua and Barbuda. Antigua and Barbuda has a two-party system, which means that there are two dominant political parties, with extreme difficulty for anybody to achieve electoral success under the banner of any other party.

== Parties ==
=== Major parties ===
Party	Acronym	Leader	Political position	Ideology	House seats
Antigua and Barbuda Labour Party	ABLP	Gaston Browne	Centre-right	Republicanism; Paternalistic conservatism; Fiscal conservatism; Economic liberalism; Pro-unitary statehood	15 / 17
United Progressive Party	UPP	Jamale Pringle	Centre-left	Social democracy; Socialism; Anti-corruption; Pan-Africanism	1 / 17
Barbuda People's Movement	BPM	Trevor Walker	Centre-left	Barbudan nationalism; Social democracy; Federalism	1 / 17

=== Other parties ===
Party	Acronym	Leader	Political position	Ideology	House seats
Democratic National Alliance	DNA	Joanne Massiah	Centre-left	Social democracy	0 / 17

- Missing Link (Voice of the People)
- Saving Grace Party

== Former parties ==
- Antigua Caribbean Liberation Movement
- Barbuda Independence Movement
- New Barbuda Development Movement
- Progressive Labour Movement
- United National Democratic Party
- Barbuda People's Movement for Change
- Barbudans for a Better Barbuda
- Democratic People's Party
- First Christian Democratic Party
- National Labour Party
- National Movement for Change
- National Reform Movement
- Organisation for National Development

== See also ==
- Politics of Antigua and Barbuda
- List of political parties by country
