= List of prime ministers of Antigua and Barbuda =

This is a list of prime ministers of Antigua and Barbuda.

== Chief minister of Antigua (1960–1967) ==
No.	Portrait	Name (Birth–Death)	Term of office			Political party	Election
No.	Portrait	Name (Birth–Death)	Took office	Left office	Time in office	Political party	Election
1	Vere Bird	Vere Bird (1910–1999)	1 January 1960	27 February 1967	7 years, 57 days	ABLP	1960; 1965

== Premiers of Antigua (1967–1981) ==
No.	Portrait	Name (Birth–Death)	Term of office			Political party	Election
No.	Portrait	Name (Birth–Death)	Took office	Left office	Time in office	Political party	Election
1	Vere Bird	Vere Bird (1910–1999)	27 February 1967	14 February 1971	3 years, 352 days	ABLP	—
2	George Walter	George Walter (1928–2008)	14 February 1971	19 February 1976	5 years, 5 days	PLM	1971
(1)	Vere Bird	Vere Bird (1910–1999)	19 February 1976	1 November 1981	5 years, 255 days	ABLP	1976; 1980

== Prime ministers of Antigua and Barbuda (1981–present) ==
No.	Portrait	Name (Birth–Death)	Term of office			Political party	Election
No.	Portrait	Name (Birth–Death)	Took office	Left office	Time in office	Political party	Election
1	Vere Bird	Vere Bird (1910–1999)	1 November 1981	9 March 1994	12 years, 128 days	ABLP	1984; 1989
2	Lester Bird	Lester Bird (1938–2021)	9 March 1994	24 March 2004	10 years, 15 days	ABLP	1994; 1999
3	Baldwin Spencer	Baldwin Spencer (born 1948)	24 March 2004	13 June 2014	10 years, 81 days	UPP	2004; 2009
4	Gaston Browne	Gaston Browne (born 1967)	13 June 2014	Incumbent	11 years, 349 days	ABLP	2014; 2018; 2023; 2026

== Timeline ==
This is a graphical lifespan timeline of the prime ministers of Antigua and Barbuda. They are listed in order of first assuming office.

The following chart lists prime ministers by lifespan (living prime ministers on the green line), with the years outside of their premiership in beige.

The following chart shows prime ministers by their age (living prime ministers in green), with the years of their premiership in blue.

== See also ==
- Prime Ministers of Queen Elizabeth II
- Prime Ministers of King Charles III
- List of Commonwealth Heads of Government
- Politics of Antigua and Barbuda
- Prime Minister of the West Indies Federation
- Governor-General of Antigua and Barbuda
- List of Privy Counsellors (1952–2022)
