= Elections in Antigua and Barbuda =

Elections in Antigua and Barbuda take place in the framework of a parliamentary democracy.

== Electoral system ==
Antigua and Barbuda's electoral law was passed on 31 October 1975 and was last amended in 2002. Elections are overseen by the Office of the Supervisor of Elections and an Electoral Commission, which was established in 2002. The latter consists of five members appointed by the Governor-General; three (including the chair) on the advice of the Prime Minister and two on the advice of the leader of the opposition.

=== House of Representatives ===
The House of Representatives has 17 elected members and two unelected members, the Attorney General and the Speaker. Elections for the House are held every five years, although early elections can take place if Parliament is dissolved by the Prime Minister. By-elections must take place within 120 days of a member vacating their seat.

Members are elected via a plurality in single-member constituencies. Voters must be aged 18 or over, be citizens of the country or citizens of a Commonwealth country who has lived in the country for at least three years prior to a qualifying date, and have been resident in the constituency for at least a month prior to the qualifying date.

Candidates must be at least 21 years old, citizens of the country, and have lived in the country for at least a year prior to the elections. They must also have the ability to speak and (unless blind) be able to read English with "sufficient proficiency". Those with dual citizenship or an undischarged bankruptcy are ineligible, as are those who have been imprisoned for more than a year or have committed electoral offences within the previous ten years, or are insane or under a death sentence.

=== Senate ===
The Senate is unelected and consists of 17 members appointed by the Governor-General; eleven on the advice of the Prime Minister, four on the advice of the leader of the opposition, one on the advice of the Barbuda Council and one at the discretion of the Governor-General.

== History ==
Universal suffrage was introduced in 1951, although less than 20% of the population was registered to vote during the 1950s. The first elections held under this system resulted in a victory for the Antigua Labour Party, which won all eight seats. The ALP dominated Antiguan politics, winning every seat in elections held in 1956, 1960 and 1965. During this period voter turnout remained low, dropping to just 38% for the 1960 elections. Although they were defeated by the Progressive Labour Movement in 1971, the party regained power in 1976 (despite receiving fewer votes than the PLM) and remained the ruling party until 2004 under the leadership of Vere Bird and later his son, Lester Bird. During this period elections were considered to be neither free nor fair. After taking over from his father prior to the 1994 elections, Lester had promised to fight corruption. However, the elections that year remained neither free nor far, with no guarantee of secret balloting, a voter registration open to abuse and the voter roll being inflated by 25% with emigrants or deceased residents. Continued irregularities in the 1999 elections were noted by a Commonwealth observer group, which recommended the establishment of an independent Electoral Commission and year-round registration for elections. The Commission was set up in 2001 and the ALP's second period of dominance ended with defeat by the United Progressive Party in the 2004 elections. The UPP won a second term in office in 2009. However, in the 2014 general election, the Antigua Labour Party won 14 of 17 seats, while the ruling UPP won the other three seats. In the 2018 general election, held on 21 March, the ABLP won 15 seats, the UPP won 1 seat and the Barbuda Peoples Movement the seat for Barbuda.
