= 2023 Barbuda Council election =

- 29 March 2023
- 4 of 11 seats in the Barbuda Council
Party	Leader	Vote %	Seats	+/–
BPM	Trevor Walker	63.85	4	
This lists parties that won seats. See the complete results below.
Chairperson of the Barbuda Council before	Chairperson of the Barbuda Council after
Mackenzie Frank; BPM	Mackenzie Frank; BPM

On March 29, 2023, elections for the Barbuda Council were held, resulting in a victory for the Barbuda People's Movement (BPM).

Candidates were nominated on 19 March 2023.

== Results ==
Party	Votes	%	Seats				
Party	Votes	%	Ex officio	Not up	Up	Won	Total
Barbuda People's Movement	1,683	63.85	2	5	4	4	11
Antigua and Barbuda Labour Party	828	31.41	0	0	0	0	0
Independent	125	4.74	0	0	0	0	0
Total	2,636	100.00	2	5	4	4	11
Source: Observer

=== By candidate and polling station ===
Party	Name	Polling Station A	Polling Station B	Polling Station C	Polling Station D	Total
Party	Name	AKBAR - CUFFY	DANIEL - IBRAHIM	J - OSCAR	PARKER - YEARWOOD	Total
Barbuda People's Movement	Devon Warner	87	133	95	123	438
Barbuda People's Movement	John Mussington	87	132	87	127	433
Barbuda People's Movement	Sharima Deazle	80	122	92	123	417
Barbuda People's Movement	Fitzroy Warner	72	117	88	118	395
Antigua and Barbuda Labour Party	Mackeisha Desouza	42	58	69	53	222
Antigua and Barbuda Labour Party	Orlando Morris	46	57	64	53	220
Antigua and Barbuda Labour Party	Bentham Lewis	33	54	60	46	193
Antigua and Barbuda Labour Party	Zaria Nedd	29	58	61	45	193
Independent	Jermaine Desouza	28	40	26	19	113
Independent	Ordrick Samuel	5	4	1	2	12
Total		509	775	643	709	2,636
Source: Observer
