= 2025 Barbuda Council election =

Barbuda council election

- 26 March 2025
- 5 of 11 seats in the Barbuda Council
- Turnout: 58.36%
Party	Leader	Vote %	Seats	+/–
BPM	Trevor Walker	62.18	5	
This lists parties that won seats. See the complete results below.
Chairperson of the Barbuda Council before	Chairperson of the Barbuda Council after
Devon Warner; BPM	Devon Warner; BPM

Elections for five of the nine elected seats in the Barbuda Council were held on 26 March 2025. The election was a landslide for the Barbuda People's Movement, who hold all eleven seats on the council, including the two ex officio seats. Important issues in this election were land rights, the environment, and infrastructure.

== Background ==
After the landslide victory for the BPM in 2023, calls for Barbudan independence re-emerged, with the pro-independence Barbuda Land Rights and Resources Committee launching a plan for a new waterfront area in Codrington and criticising the Barbuda Council for not meeting enough. In October 2024, the controversial Burton–Nibbs International Airport opened, replacing the Barbuda Codrington Airport. The airport is located in a sensitive environmental area and in 2023, attempts were made to demolish the airport before construction was completed. In January 2025, the land adjudication process was also condemned by the council, after it began in April 2024.

== Electoral system ==
The Barbuda Council has elections every two years. The amount of seats up for election alternates, with odd-numbered years having five seats up for election, and even numbered years having four seats up for election. Every member has a term of four years. One ex officio member is the member of parliament for Barbuda, who is directly elected by the island's population. Another ex officio member is the Barbuda Council's senator, who is nominated by the council and appointed by the governor-general. In total, there are eleven members on the council.

== Results ==
Polls closed at 18:00 local time, and vote counting commenced at 18:49. The election was called for the Barbuda People's Movement by the Barbuda Channel at 23:31. The official count was delivered by the Antigua and Barbuda Electoral Commission at 23:44.

Party	Votes	%	Seats				
Party	Votes	%	Ex officio	Not up	Up	Won	Total
Barbuda People's Movement	2,259	62.18	2	4	5	5	5
Antigua and Barbuda Labour Party	1,138	31.32	0	0	0	0	0
Independent	236	6.50	0	0	0	0	0
Total	3,633	100.00	2	4	5	5	11

=== By candidate and polling station ===
Party	Name	Station 1	Station 2	Station 3	Station 4	Station 5	Total
Barbuda People's Movement	Wayde Burton	123	116	110	65	126	540
Barbuda People's Movement	Nadia George	105	95	91	54	106	451
Barbuda People's Movement	Melanie Beazer	98	88	86	53	101	426
Barbuda People's Movement	Jacklyn Frank	104	90	79	52	103	428
Barbuda People's Movement	Nico Antonio	104	84	77	51	98	414
Antigua and Barbuda Labour Party	Orlando Morris	46	38	66	51	50	251
Antigua and Barbuda Labour Party	Mackiesha Desuza	48	28	60	43	46	225
Antigua and Barbuda Labour Party	Bonnietha John	47	35	55	43	42	222
Antigua and Barbuda Labour Party	Arthur Nibbs	45	30	54	43	49	221
Antigua and Barbuda Labour Party	Bernard Christian	42	31	58	45	43	219
Independent	Jermaine Desouza	36	46	31	29	36	178
Independent	Hasketh Daniel	7	12	18	12	9	58
Total		805	693	785	541	809	3,633
Source: Antigua and Barbuda Electoral Commission
