= National Reform =

National Reform or National Reformation may refer to:

- National Reform Association (1844), a nineteenth-century American movement to lobby Congress to pass land reforms
- National Reform Association (1864), a nineteenth-century American movement to amend the U.S. Constitution to include Christian language
- National Reform Association (19th century, UK), a nineteenth-century British radical movement started by Joshua Walmsley
- National Reform Movement (Antigua and Barbuda), a political party in Antigua and Barbuda
- National Reform Party (Belize), a Belizean, Christian conservative political party seeking office under the following guiding principles
- National Reform Party (Ghana), a political party in Ghana
- National Reform Party (Greece)
- National Reform Party (United States), an adjunct of the National Labor Union, established in 1868
- National Reform Party (Hawaii)
- National Reform Trend, a political party in Iraq
- National Reformation Party, a political party in Liberia
- Movement for National Reform, a moderate Islamist political party in Algeria
- National Party for Reform, a political party in DR Congo

== See also ==
- National Reform Movement (disambiguation)
