= New Barbuda Development Movement =

Barbudan political party

New Barbuda Development Movement is a political party in Barbuda, Antigua and Barbuda. NBDM was an offshoot of the Antigua Labour Party. The party contested the March 1997 elections to the Barbuda Council, but won no seats (Barbuda People's Movement won all seats).

As of 2006 the party remained a valid party in Antigua and Barbuda.
