= 2021 Barbuda Council election =

Election in Barbuda

- 29 March 2021
- 5 of 11 seats in the Barbuda Council
- Turnout: 63.72%
Party	Leader	Vote %	Seats	+/–
BPM	Trevor Walker	63.18	5	
This lists parties that won seats. See the complete results below.
Chairperson of the Barbuda Council before	Chairperson of the Barbuda Council after
Calsey Joseph; BPM	Jacklyn Frank; BPM

Council elections were held in Barbuda on March 29, 2021. The elections were won by the Barbuda People's Movement. Voter turnout was 64%.

== Results ==
Party	Votes	%	Seats				
Party	Votes	%	Ex officio	Not up	Up	Won	Total
Barbuda People's Movement	2,303	63.18	2	4	5	5	9
Antigua and Barbuda Labour Party	1,319	36.19	0	0	0	0	0
Independent	23	0.63	0	0	0	0	0
Total	3,645	100.00	2	4	5	5	11
Valid votes	767	99.48					
Invalid/blank votes	4	0.52					
Total votes	771	100.00					
Registered voters/turnout	1,210	63.72					
Source: ABEC

=== By candidate and polling station ===
Party	Name	Polling Station A	Polling Station B	Polling Station C	Polling Station D	Total
Party	Name	AKBAR - CUFFY	DANIEL - HYTON	IBRAHIM - OSCAR	PARKER - YEARWOOD	Total
Barbuda People's Movement	Wayde Burton	115	154	101	139	509
Barbuda People's Movement	Melanie Beazer	105	136	92	125	458
Barbuda People's Movement	Mackenzie Frank	98	137	92	125	452
Barbuda People's Movement	Nico Antonio	105	135	90	116	446
Barbuda People's Movement	Nadia George	101	135	92	110	438
Antigua and Barbuda Labour Party	Mackiesha Desouza	52	80	82	62	276
Antigua and Barbuda Labour Party	Tyrone Beazer	54	51	91	73	269
Antigua and Barbuda Labour Party	Kelcina George	50	73	77	63	263
Antigua and Barbuda Labour Party	Hasketh Daniel	49	72	85	53	259
Antigua and Barbuda Labour Party	Wesley Beazer	43	72	79	58	252
Independent	Ordrick Samuel	6	5	6	6	23
Total		778	1,050	887	930	3,645
Source: ABEC
