= BPMC =

BPMC may refer to:

- Banque Populaire Maroco Centrafricaine
- Barbuda People's Movement for Change
- Fenobucarb
