= Barbuda People's Movement for Change =

Barbudan political party

The Barbuda People's Movement for Change was a political party in Barbuda, part of Antigua and Barbuda.

At their last elections, 23 March 2004, the party contested the sole seat allotted to Barbuda (in total there are 17 seats in the parliament). The election ended in a draw between BPMC and the Barbuda People's Movement, which both got exactly 400 votes. A by-election was held on April 20 in which Trevor Walker of BPM was elected with 408 votes against 394 for the BPMC candidate Arthur Nibbs.

Ahead of the elections former BPMC general secretary, Ordrick Samuel had launched a new party, Barbudans for a Better Barbuda.

BPMC was allied to the Antigua Labour Party.

== Electoral results ==
=== House of Representatives ===
Election	Votes	%	Seats	+/–	Position	Government
2004	400	1.01	0 / 17	New	4th	Opposition

=== Barbuda Council ===
Election	Leaders	Votes			Seats		Position	Government
Election	Leaders	No.	%	±	No.	±	Position	Government
2003								BPM
2005		1,988	44.03				2nd	BPM
