= National Reform Movement =

National Reform Movement may refer to different political parties around the world:

- National Reform Movement (Antigua and Barbuda)
- National Reform Movement (Iraq)
- National Reform Movement (Ireland)
- National Reformation Movement (Jamaica)
