= John Mussington =

Chairperson of the Barbuda Council
- Incumbent
- Assumed office 7 April 2025
- Preceded by: Devon Warner

Personal details
- Party: Barbuda People's Movement

John Mussington is a politician, marine biologist, and former school principal serving as the chairperson of the Barbuda Council since 7 April 2025. Mussington took office as the chairperson following Devon Warner's resignation due to health concerns. He is a supporter of Barbudan autonomy and the Barbuda Land Acts. Mussington is one of the major activists in the Barbuda crisis, suing the government for its alleged violations of Barbudan land rights.
