= Mackenzie Frank =

Antiguan politician

Chairperson of the Barbuda Council
- In office 2022 – 16 January 2024
- Preceded by: Jacklyn Frank
- Succeeded by: Devon Warner

Vice Chairperson of the Barbuda Council
- In office 16 January 2024 – 26 March 2025
- Preceded by: Devon Warner

Member of the Senate of Antigua and Barbuda
- In office 26 April 2004 – 26 April 2014; Government Barbuda senator Deputy President
- Succeeded by: Adrian Lee

Personal details
- Party: Barbuda People's Movement
- Spouse: Claire Frank

Mackenzie Morris Frank is a Barbuda People's Movement politician. Frank was the vice chairperson of the Barbuda Council, and a former chairperson until 16 January 2024. He also served as the government senator for Barbuda from 26 April 2004 to 26 April 2014.
