= 2009 Antiguan general election =

- 12 March 2009

All 17 seats in the House of Representatives 9 seats needed for a majority
- Turnout: 80.27% (▼10.92pp)
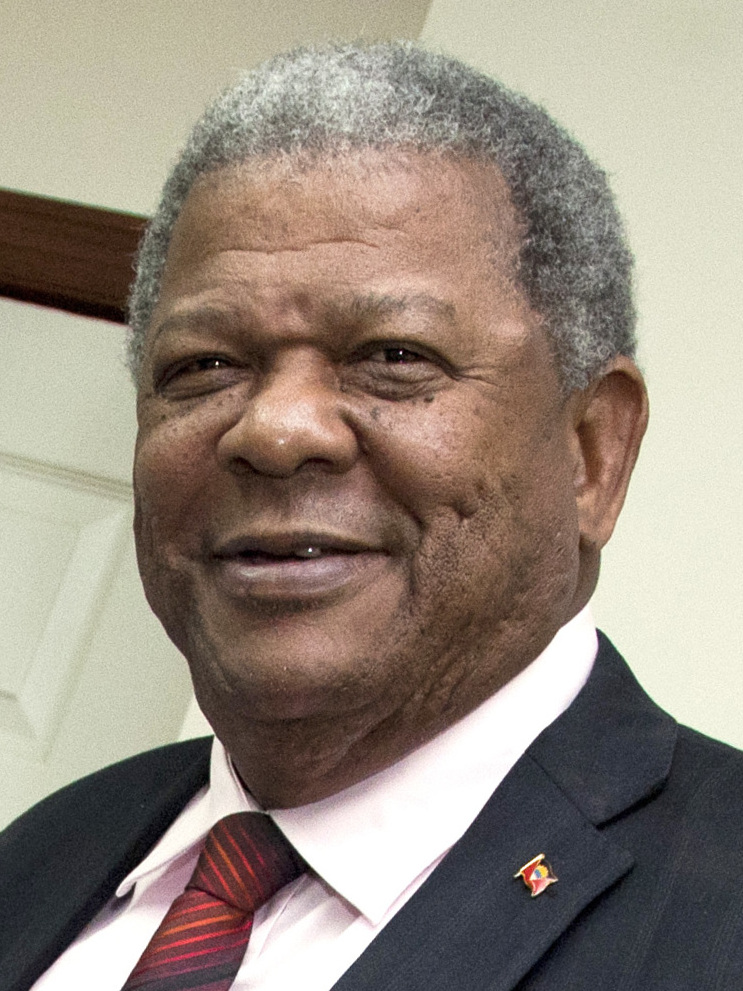

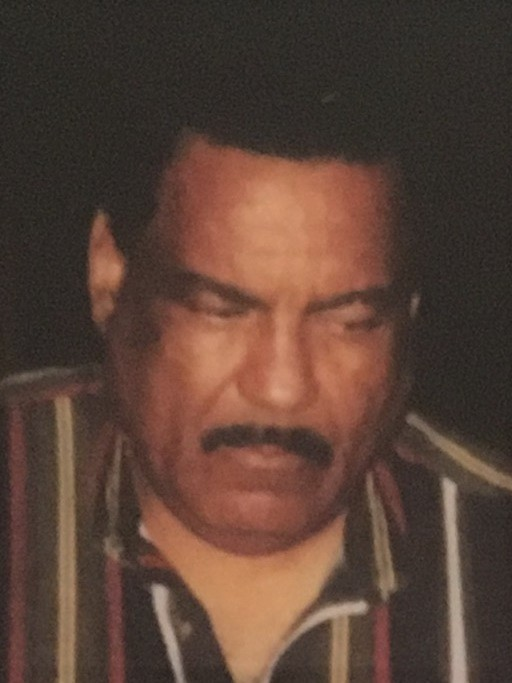

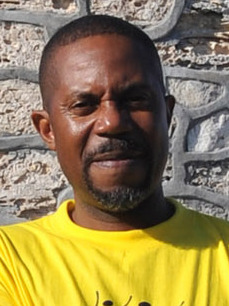
	First party	Second party	Third party
Leader	Baldwin Spencer	Lester Bird	Trevor Walker
Party	UPP	ALP	BPM
Seats won	9	7	1
Seat change	▼3	▲3	Steady
Popular vote	21,239	19,657	474
Percentage	50.95%	47.16%	1.14%
Swing	▼4.55pp	▲5.22pp	▼0.12pp
- Results by constituency
Prime Minister before election
Baldwin Spencer
UPP
Subsequent Prime Minister
Baldwin Spencer
UPP

General elections were held in Antigua and Barbuda on 12 March 2009. The result was a victory for the United Progressive Party, which won nine of the seventeen elected seats in the House of Representatives.

== Conduct ==
Three days before the elections the Chamber of Commerce announced observations of voter registration irregularities and called for an investigation into the matter. For example, in the Saint Peter constituency, voter registration increased by 41%.

A three-member observation team from Belize, Canada, and Guyana observed the election.

== Results ==
Party	Votes	%	Seats	+/–
United Progressive Party	21,239	50.95	9	–3
Antigua Labor Party	19,657	47.16	7	+3
Barbuda People's Movement	474	1.14	1	0
Organisation for National Development	119	0.29	0	New
Independents	196	0.47	0	0
Total	41,685	100.00	17	0
Valid votes	41,685	99.52		
Invalid/blank votes	201	0.48		
Total votes	41,886	100.00		
Registered voters/turnout	52,183	80.27		
Source: PDBA, IFES

== Aftermath ==
On 31 March 2010, a judge nullified the election of UPP's leader Spencer and two other UPP MPs, calling the UPP's majority into question. However, on 24 October the Court of Appeal of the Eastern Caribbean Supreme Court overturned the High Court's decision and decided that the three MPs were duly elected.
