= Vice Chairperson of the Barbuda Council =

Deputy leader of the Barbudan Government

Vice Chairperson of Barbuda Council
- Seal of the Barbuda Council

- Flag of the Barbuda Council
- Incumbent; Nadia George since 7 April 2025
- Reports to: Chairperson of the Barbuda Council
- Salary: 39,144 EC$ annually

The Vice Chairperson of the Barbuda Council, officially the Deputy Chairperson of the Barbuda Council, is the deputy leader of the Barbuda Council.

Each year, the Council elects two members to serve as the Chairman and Deputy Chairman of the Council at its first meeting in January before moving on to discuss any other business, with the caveat that the election of a Chairman and Deputy Chairman shall occur at the first meeting following any year in which an election is held in accordance with section 14 of the Barbuda Local Government Act.

The deputy chairman of the council will preside over meetings in the chairman's absence. In the event that neither the chairman nor the deputy chairman is present at a meeting, the members in attendance may choose a temporary chairman from among themselves for the duration of that meeting. The members of the Council shall elect a new Deputy Chairman to fill any vacancy that may arise in the event that the Deputy Chairman resigns, passes away, or is disqualified from serving on the Council.
