= 1994 Antiguan general election =

- 8 March 1994

All 17 seats in the House of Representatives 9 seats needed for a majority
- Turnout: 62.32% (▲1.60pp)
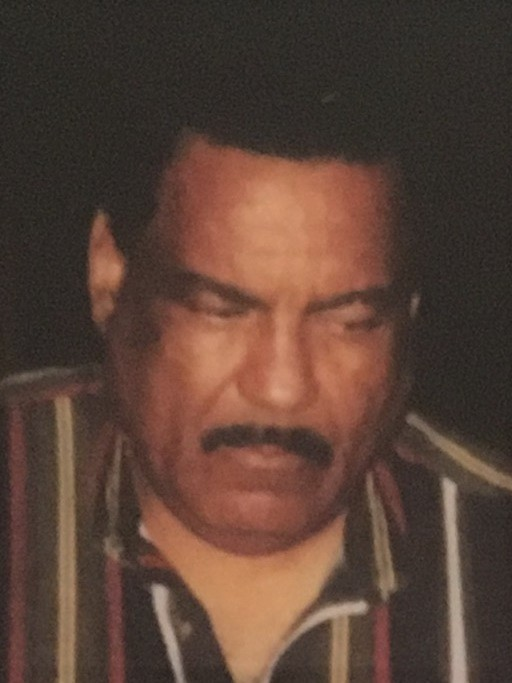

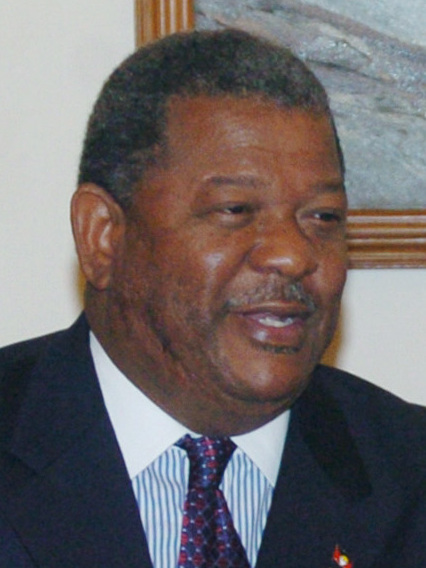

| | First party | Second party | Third party |
|---|---|---|---|
| Leader | Lester Bird | Baldwin Spencer | Hilbourne Frank |
| Party | ALP | UPP | BPM |
| Seats won | 11 | 5 | 1 |
| Seat change | ▼4 | ▲5 | Steady |
| Popular vote | 14,763 | 11,852 | 367 |
| Percentage | 54.44% | 43.71% | 1.35% |
| Swing | ▼9.41pp | ▲43.71pp | ▼0.02pp |
- Results by constituency
Prime Minister before election
Vere Bird
ALP
Subsequent Prime Minister
Lester Bird
ALP

General elections were held in Antigua and Barbuda on 8 March 1994. They were won by the governing Antigua Labour Party under the leadership of Lester Bird. Bird had been appointed leader of the ALP before the elections, after his father and predecessor Vere Bird announced his intention to retire. Lester Bird became Prime Minister after elections. Voter turnout was 62.3%. This was the first election contested by the United Progressive Party, under future Prime Minister Baldwin Spencer.

The elections were described as neither free nor fair, as they were marred by several problems, including failing to guarantee a secret ballot, a deficient registration process open to abuse, and the inflation of the voter registry by 25% with the names of deceased people or emigrants.

== Results ==
| Party | Votes | % | Seats | +/– |
|---|---|---|---|---|
| Antigua Labour Party | 14,763 | 54.44 | 11 | –4 |
| United Progressive Party | 11,852 | 43.71 | 5 | +4 |
| Barbuda People's Movement | 367 | 1.35 | 1 | 0 |
| Workers Amalgamated Congressional Symbolisation | 11 | 0.04 | 0 | New |
| Independents | 123 | 0.45 | 0 | 0 |
| Total | 27,116 | 100.00 | 17 | 0 |
| Valid votes | 27,116 | 99.46 | | |
| Invalid/blank votes | 147 | 0.54 | | |
| Total votes | 27,263 | 100.00 | | |
| Registered voters/turnout | 43,749 | 62.32 | | |
Source: Nohlen
