= 2014 Antiguan general election =

- 12 June 2014

All 17 seats in the House of Representatives 9 seats needed for a majority
- Turnout: 90.27% (▲10.00pp)
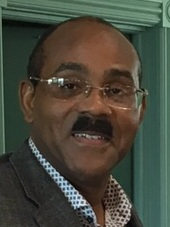

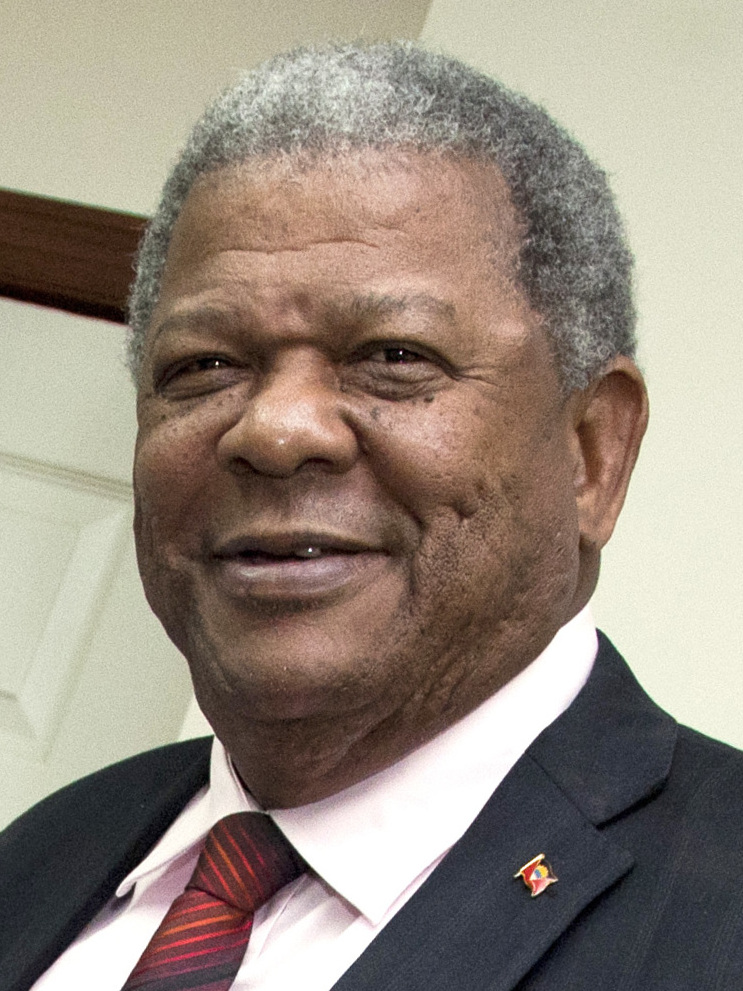
	First party	Second party
Leader	Gaston Browne	Baldwin Spencer
Party	ABLP	UPP
Last election	47.16%, 7 seats	50.95%, 9 seats
Seats won	14	3
Seat change	▲7	▼6
Popular vote	24,212	17,994
Percentage	56.45%	41.95%
Swing	▲9.29pp	▼9.00pp
- Results by constituency
Prime Minister before election
Baldwin Spencer
UPP
Subsequent Prime Minister
Gaston Browne
ABLP

General elections were held in Antigua and Barbuda on 12 June 2014. The result was a victory for the opposition Antigua and Barbuda Labour Party led by Gaston Browne, which won 14 of the 17 seats. Following the election, Browne became the country's youngest Prime Minister.

Baldwin Spencer's United Progressive Party government came to the elections with an unpopular image after ten years in power and a rise in violent crime, in addition to a period of economic contraction in the context of the global economic recession, which motivated Spencer to seek help from the International Monetary Fund. Meanwhile, the ABLP, reconstituted after the arrival of Gaston Browne to its leadership (the first Labour leader outside the Bird dynasty), ran on abolishing personal income tax, creating more jobs and reactivating more local and foreign investments.

The elections resulted in a resounding victory for the ABLP, which achieved 56.64% of the validly cast votes and a record absolute majority of 14 of the 17 seats, the largest victory for any political party since 1989. His most surprising triumph took place in Barbuda, where he won by one vote and snatched the representative seat of the island from the Barbuda People's Movement for the first time in its history, the first time since 1971 that a national party won the Barbuda seat. For its part, the UPP suffered the worst defeat for an acting government in the history of the country and obtained 41.76% of the votes and 3 seats. The turnout was 90.08% of the registered electorate, the second highest in the country’s electoral history.

Browne was sworn in as Prime Minister of Antigua and Barbuda on June 13. At 47 years old at the time of his swearing-in, he became the youngest head of government in the country's history. Spencer, who had retained his seat in St. John's Rural West, took over as leader of the opposition in parliament, but withdrew from the leadership of the UPP in 2015.

== Background ==
The 2009 general elections, one of the tightest in the country's history, gave victory to the ruling United Progressive Party, Prime Minister Baldwin Spencer, who revalidated his absolute majority by a narrow margin with 9 of the 17 parliamentary seats, which would be joined by the seat of Trevor Walker, of the Barbuda People's Movement. The ABLP, led by Lester Bird, improved its results and Bird himself returned to parliament as leader of the opposition, but for the first time in its history the party lost two consecutive elections. The voting process was slow and recorded deficiencies that were criticized by international observation groups, although they considered the elections reasonably free and fair. However, Bird did not acknowledge the result, filing challenges in four constituencies and denouncing electoral fraud. Although he obtained a favorable judgment from the Supreme Court, annulling the results of the aforementioned constituencies, an appeal by Spencer's government suspended the sentence and finally prevailed in the Court of Appeals, confirming the results. Bird did not recognize his defeat as clean and, as a result, did not fulfill his promise to resign as Labour leader if the party lost the elections.

The following period was marked by the deterioration of the economic situation, as a result of the global recession, with an increase in unemployment from 5 to 25% in just ten years. The deterioration of the economic situation also saw a surge in crime that had already been perceived in previous years. Although Spencer had come to power campaigning against the endemic corruption in the Bird dynasty, the UPP government also faced its own scandals, which caused a rapid deterioration in the party's popularity. Spencer's government refused to extradite Allen Stanford, found guilty of fraud by a court in the United States and sentenced to 110 years in prison for running a billion-dollar business in which customers were encouraged to invest in certificates of deposit from Stanford International Bank of Antigua with false promises of security and high returns. In February 2013, a group of defrauded investors directly sued the government of Antigua and Barbuda, claiming that senior Antiguan officials knew about Stanford's plan and benefited from it. Although Spencer's government took steps to improve regulations in the country's financial environment, none of the officials accused of participating in the case were brought to trial.

During the second half of his term, the Spencer government faced severe criticism and judicial challenges against a number of controversial legislation. Spencer sought to implement a Citizenship by Investment Program, based on the one carried out by other countries in the English-speaking Caribbean and through which investors could directly acquire the citizenship and passports of Antigua and Barbuda by donating money to a charity or buying real estate. The project was about to be defeated in Parliament when four government senators voted against, which resulted in its dismissal. Similarly, an amendment to the Representation of the People Act, made in 2011, altered the composition and selection method of the Electoral Commission, while also decreasing the authority of the Election Supervisor. However, the measure was declared unconstitutional by the Supreme Court, in response to a challenge filed by Labour. Labour also questioned the constitutionality of another amendment that established that voters should re-register for the 2014 elections. Re-enrollment began in September 2010 and was plagued with obstacles, including power outages, long queues and computer failures, and had to be extended for a fifth week.

== Electoral system ==
The elections were held under the Constitution of 1981 and the Representation of the People Act of 1975, supervised by the Antigua and Barbuda Electoral Commission. Under this constitutional framework, Antigua and Barbuda was a constitutional monarchy within the Commonwealth of Nations with a parliamentary system based on the Westminster model. Queen Elizabeth II was the Queen of Antigua and Barbuda and ceremonial head of state, represented locally by governor-general Wilfred Jacobs, while the head of government and effective leader of the executive branch was the prime minister, subject to the confidence of the bicameral Parliament composed of the House of Representatives elected by popular vote through a single-member majority ballot for a maximum term of five years and a Senate appointed on the basis of the results of the House elections.

The House of Representatives is composed of seventeen seats elected in a first-past-the-post single-member system. The country is divided into seventeen constituencies, each of which is represented by a member of parliament elected by a simple majority of votes. The party or political group that manages to add a majority of at least nine of the seventeen seats forms a government and appoints the prime minister, while the leader of the party with the most seats who is not part of the government occupies the position of leader of the opposition. The Senate, for its part, is also composed of seventeen seats entirely appointed by the governor-general.

All Commonwealth of Nations citizens of at least eighteen years of age who meet the residence or domicile requirements have the right to vote in the parliamentary elections. Citizens who are at least twenty-one years of age, have resided in the country for a minimum of twelve months immediately preceding the day of nomination and are able to speak and read the English language fluently enough to allow them to participate actively in parliamentary procedures are qualified to become members of parliament. Persons who owe loyalty to a foreign state, ministers of religion, those who have a bankruptcy without liberal, people declared mentally unwell, sentenced to death or imprisonment for a period of at least twelve months, and those related to electoral crimes or guilty of certain crimes within the previous ten years are disqualified.

== Campaign ==
The United Progressive Party focused its campaign on its previous ten years in power, claiming to have succeeded in rebuilding the foundations for the country's sustainable development. Its manifesto, "The People's Charter", focused more on the party's accomplishments rather than the previous Labour government. The UPP committed to continuing with social development programs, such as scholarships for school uniforms and the school meal program. The party blamed the deterioration of the economic situation on the global crisis and proposed the implementation of tax relief and social programs. In the field of security, the UPP promised to address crime prevention and public order. For infrastructure, they proposed the construction of a new port, a modern performing arts center, and the exploration of space technology.

Labour focused on criticism of Spencer's management. Their manifesto was titled "The People's Rescue Plan" and presented a program to "rebuild" the country focused on reducing taxes, fighting crime and creating jobs. The ABLP accused the UPP of corruption, incompetence and mismanagement, claiming that the country had lost millions of dollars in corrupt contracts. The ABLP promised to abolish personal income tax, which had already been abolished during the Vere Bird government and then re-instated by Spencer. For security, it proposed the implementation of a comprehensive strategy to combat crime, the creation of "community councils" to collaborate in the reduction of crime, the transparent regulation of firearms licenses, the strengthening of police training and equipment, the intensification of education against drugs, the reduction of poverty and unemployment as preventive measures, and the strengthening of laws and penalties in crimes related to firearms and violence. Browne also highlighted the transition of party leadership, stating that the ABLP had demonstrated its ability to renew itself and build more dynamic leadership for the benefit of the country.

A minor party, Vere Bird III's Antigua and Barbuda True Labour Party, published a sixteen-page document titled "The Plan", in which the party was described as a "democratic alternative to the corrupt management of the ABLP". The ABTLP attacked the Spencer government's citizenship by investment program, saying it was the same as selling the country, and pledged to repeal the legislation on that regard. Like the ABLP, it promised to eliminate personal income tax to attract investors, as well as create employment in the light manufacturing industry and promote agriculture and aquaculture to supply the hotel industry. On the external level, he proposed to take greater steps towards Caribbean integration and to have rapprochements with the states of West Africa.

== Party conventions ==
=== Antigua and Barbuda Labour Party ===
The Antigua Labour Party went through a deep leadership crisis after its defeat in the 2009 elections. Lester Bird, who had led the party since 1993 after succeeding his father, Vere Bird (who had headed the party since its foundation) refused to resign despite having promised that he would do so if the ALP lost the elections again. With Bird's leadership in question, internal dissent began to form in the face of the eventual party convention at the end of 2012, where the leadership that would contest the 2014 elections would be chosen. Gaston Browne, MP for St. John's City West, who had presented a challenge against Bird at the pre-election convention, announced that he would compete again against the former prime minister. For his part, former finance minister Molwyn Joseph, one of the party's oldest parliamentarians, as well as Robin Yearwood, who had served as leader of the opposition between 2004 and 2006 before falling out of favor with Bird, announced candidacies. The result was one of the most disputed partisan conventions in the history of Antigua and Barbuda, and the first serious challenge to the authority of the Bird dynasty over the ALP, dominated by the family during its 66 years of existence.

As the convention approached, personal attacks between supporters of Bird and Browne intensified. Bird accused Browne's space of committing corrupt practices to bribe the convention delegates and vote for him, accusations that Browne rejected. The convention took place on 26 November 2012, at the Multipurpose Cultural Center in Perry Bay, St. John's. Bird did not show up at the event, anticipating his defeat, although his supporters and delegates did attend. Before the vote began, both Joseph and Yearwood withdrew their candidacies and affirmed their support for Bird. However, Browne ultimately won with 213 votes against 180 of Bird, while 7 delegates did not cast a vote, thus becoming the first Labour leader outside the Bird dynasty since the party was founded. Meanwhile, Gail Christian (linked to Browne) defeated Steadroy Benjamin in the race for the office of party president, becoming the first woman to reach that status in a major Antiguan and Barbudan political party. After the result was confirmed, dozens of Browne supporters celebrated, while Bird's supporters began to withdraw from the room, claiming that the vote had been "rigged".

In his acceptance speech after the victory, Browne sought to maintain a conciliatory tone with Bird's leadership, calling on his supporters to "leave the past in the past". Stating that he felt "proud" to succeed "two great leaders", he praised Lester Bird and his father, committing to respect their legacies, even suggesting the possibility of appointing Bird as "party leader emeritus" for life. Browne announced 24 April 2013 as the date for his marriage to Bird's niece, Maria, who was half his age. The party was reconstituted after Browne's triumph, changing its name to "Antigua and Barbuda Labour Party" to exalt the fact that it was "the only national party operating on the two islands". Despite its name, the ALP had already contested the elections in Barbuda several times, although it had not won the constituency since 1965.

On 31 March 2013, Vere Bird Jr., brother of Lester Bird who had been part of both the governments of the latter and his father and was a controversial political figure in the archipelago, died of a heart attack at the age of 77. In July, Vere Bird Jr.'s son Vere Bird III denounced the leadership of the ABLP as corrupt and disconnected from the original ideology of the party, and founded the ABTLP, with a view to competing in the following elections separately. Lester Bird was not part of this split and remained in the ABLP, running as a candidate for re-election in his constituency.

=== United Progressive Party ===
The United Progressive Party held its ninth biennial convention on 17 March 2013. Spencer was nominated and unanimously elected for a new term as political leader of the party, as well as a candidate for prime minister in the 2014 elections. Leon Symister was also unanimously elected as the party's new president, succeeding Harold Lovell. Lovell, who had led internal movements against Spencer's leadership in the past, became deputy political leader and declared his "unequivocal" support for the prime minister.

== Results ==
The Labour Party won 14 of 17 seats, while the ruling UPP won the other three seats. UPP prime minister Baldwin Spencer was re-elected in his seat by a narrow margin of about 30 votes. Arthur Nibbs of the Labour Party was elected in Barbuda by a single vote, which remains the last occasion that a national party won the Barbuda constituency.

Party	Votes	%	Seats	+/–
Antigua and Barbuda Labour Party	24,212	56.45	14	+7
United Progressive Party	17,994	41.95	3	−6
Barbuda People's Movement	484	1.13	0	−1
Antigua & Barbuda True Labour Party	182	0.42	0	New
Antigua Barbuda People's Movement	13	0.03	0	New
Missing Link VOP	7	0.02	0	New
Total	42,892	100.00	17	0
Valid votes	42,892	99.57		
Invalid/blank votes	185	0.43		
Total votes	43,077	100.00		
Registered voters/turnout	47,720	90.27		
Source: Antigua Elections

=== By constituency ===
Constituency	Electorate	Turnout	%	Political party	Candidate	Votes	%
All Saints East & St. Luke	3,365	3,087	91.74	United Progressive Party	Joanne Massiah	1,438	51.69
All Saints East & St. Luke	3,365	3,087	91.74	Antigua and Barbuda Labour Party	Colin James	1,438	46.78
All Saints East & St. Luke	3,365	3,087	91.74	Antigua Barbuda People's Movement	Owen George	12	0.39
All Saints West	3,959	3,560	89.92	Antigua and Barbuda Labour Party	Michael Browne	1,931	54.49
All Saints West	3,959	3,560	89.92	United Progressive Party	Lorencezo Codrington	1,596	45.03
All Saints West	3,959	3,560	89.92	Antigua & Barbuda True Labour Party	Dayton Samuel	17	0.48
Barbuda	1,017	972	95.58	Antigua and Barbuda Labour Party	Arthur Nibbs	485	50.05
Barbuda	1,017	972	95.58	Barbuda People's Movement	Trevor Walker	484	49.95
St. George	4,535	4,012	88.47	Antigua and Barbuda Labour Party	Dean Jonas	2,182	54.51
St. George	4,535	4,012	88.47	United Progressive Party	Jacqui Quinn-Leandro	1,765	44.09
St. George	4,535	4,012	88.47	Antigua and Barbuda True Labour Party	Kelton Dalso	56	1.40
St. John's City East	1,585	1,480	93.38	Antigua and Barbuda Labour Party	Melford Nicholas	794	53.79
St. John's City East	1,585	1,480	93.38	United Progressive Party	Harold Lovell	682	46.21
St. John's City South	1,459	1,323	90.68	Antigua and Barbuda Labour Party	Cutie Benjamin	828	62.92
St. John's City South	1,459	1,323	90.68	United Progressive Party	Mervyn Richards	488	37.08
St. John's City West	2,335	2,131	91.26	Antigua and Barbuda Labour Party	Gaston Browne	1,394	65.57
St. John's City West	2,335	2,131	91.26	United Progressive Party	Colin Derrick	732	34.43
St. John's Rural East	4,169	3,719	89.21	Antigua and Barbuda Labour Party	Lester Bird	2,144	57.95
St. John's Rural East	4,169	3,719	89.21	United Progressive Party	Leon Cort	1,556	42.05
St. John's Rural North	3,406	3,089	90.69	Antigua and Barbuda Labour Party	Max Fernandez	1,860	60.55
St. John's Rural North	3,406	3,089	90.69	United Progressive Party	Hubert Maginley	1,205	39.23
St. John's Rural North	3,406	3,089	90.69	Missing Link VOP	Nigel Bascus	7	0.23
St. John's Rural South	2,924	2,592	88.82	Antigua and Barbuda Labour Party	Eustace Lake	1,548	59.84
St. John's Rural South	2,924	2,592	88.82	United Progressive Party	Philmore Benjamin	1,011	39.08
St. John's Rural South	2,924	2,592	88.82	Antigua and Barbuda True Labour Party	Vere Bird III	28	1.08
St. John's Rural West	4,493	3,978	88.54	United Progressive Party	Baldwin Spencer	1,993	50.38
St. John's Rural West	4,493	3,978	88.54	Antigua and Barbuda Labour Party	Londell Benjamin	1,963	49.62
St. Mary's North	4,127	3,690	89.41	Antigua and Barbuda Labour Party	Molwyn Joseph	2,089	56.80
St. Mary's North	4,127	3,690	89.41	United Progressive Party	Chester Hughes	1,589	43.20
St. Mary's South	2,131	1,959	91.93	Antigua and Barbuda Labour Party	Samantha Marshall	1,009	52.09
St. Mary's South	2,131	1,959	91.93	United Progressive Party	Hilson Baptiste	928	47.91
St. Paul	2,734	2,453	89.72	Antigua and Barbuda Labour Party	Chet Green	1,453	59.23
St. Paul	2,734	2,453	89.72	United Progressive Party	Eleston Adams	969	39.53
St. Paul	2,734	2,453	89.72	Antigua and Barbuda True Labour Party	Shoy Athill	29	1.18
St. Peter	2,849	2,526	88.66	Antigua and Barbuda Labour Party	Asot Michael	2,182	54.51
St. Peter	2,849	2,526	88.66	United Progressive Party	Clephane Roberts	733	28.83
St. Peter	2,849	2,526	88.66	Antigua and Barbuda True Labour Party	Sharlene Warner-Samuel	52	2.08
St. Philip North	1,580	1,446	91.52	Antigua and Barbuda Labour Party	Robin Yearwood	951	66.23
St. Philip North	1,580	1,446	91.52	United Progressive Party	Shawn Nicholas	485	33.77
St. Philip South	1,056	968	91.67	United Progressive Party	Wilmoth Daniel	523	54.37
St. Philip South	1,056	968	91.67	Antigua and Barbuda Labour Party	Lennox Weston	439	45.63
Source: Caribbean Elections

== Reactions ==
Browne said of the result that "it is evident that the people have spoken and they have spoken resoundly. [sic] [I am] very humbled by the mandate. The reality is that this country is in dire straits and would require the efforts of the entire nation. [The win is] one for you the people. We have actually set an impressive vision for this country. I remain hopeful and very optimistic about the future of the Antigua and Barbuda. I want us to work towards the vision and to make Antigua and Barbuda the envy of the other countries in the world. [The victory] itself actually speaks volumes. I would not think we could have deserved a better out turn." Spencer accepted defeat, saying that the people had clearly chosen the ALP.

International

Saint Kitts and Nevis Team Unity leader Timothy Harris congratulated Browne and said he would support the new government. He added: "I extend my very best wishes to you and your incoming administration as you assume the mandate of service to the people of Antigua and Barbuda and the region. From our many interactions over the years, I know that you are passionate and committed to build a better Antigua and Barbuda and Caribbean region. In that noble mission of service to the people you have our every encouragement and support."

== Government formation ==
Attorney Steadroy "Cuttie" Benjamin became the attorney general.
