= 1999 Antiguan general election =

- 9 March 1999

All 17 seats in the House of Representatives 9 seats needed for a majority
- Turnout: 63.61% (▲1.29pp)
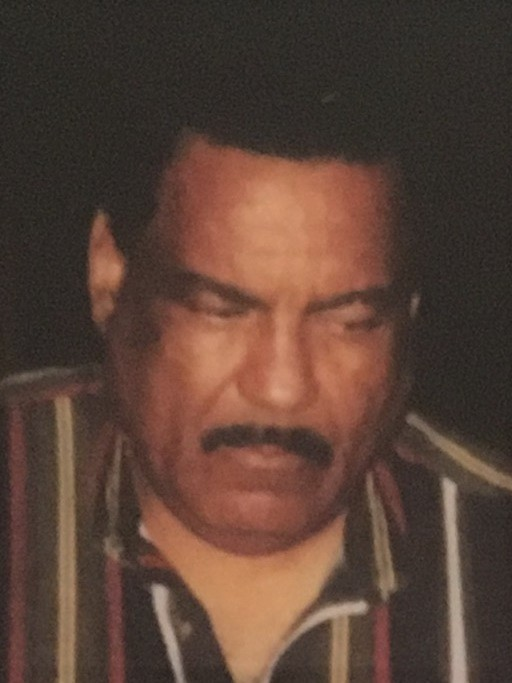

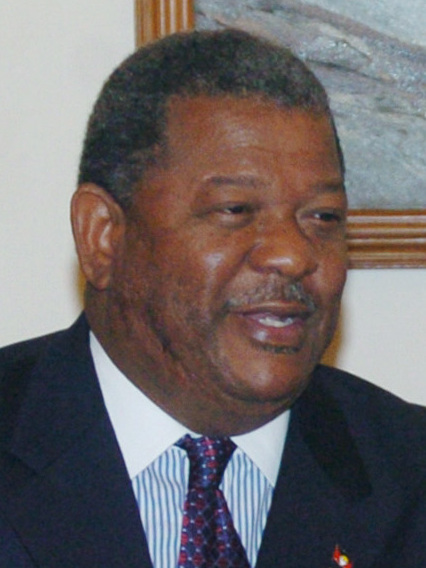

	First party	Second party	Third party
Leader	Lester Bird	Baldwin Spencer	Hilbourne Frank
Party	ALP	UPP	BPM
Seats won	12	4	1
Seat change	▲1	▼1	Steady
Popular vote	17,521	14,713	418
Percentage	52.94%	44.45%	1.26%
Swing	▼1.50pp	▲0.74pp	▼0.09pp
- Results by constituency
Prime Minister before election
Lester Bird
ALP
Subsequent Prime Minister
Lester Bird
ALP

General elections were held in Antigua and Barbuda on 9 March 1999. The elections were won by the governing Antigua Labour Party. Lester Bird was re-elected Prime Minister of Antigua and Barbuda. Voter turnout was 63.6%.

The elections were extremely close, with the UPP losing five seats by a narrow 554 votes in total, and had the elections been free and fair (the government controlled almost all newspapers as well as television and radio stations), the opposition could have won a majority. Opposition leader Baldwin Spencer criticised the conduct and fairness of the elections and began a hunger strike in protest to the flaws in the system. The government responded by establishing the independent Antigua & Barbuda Electoral Commission in 2001.

== Results ==
Party	Votes	%	Seats	+/–
Antigua Labour Party	17,521	52.94	12	+1
United Progressive Party	14,713	44.45	4	−1
Barbuda People's Movement	418	1.26	1	0
Antigua Freedom Party	57	0.17	0	New
National Reform Movement	33	0.10	0	New
Independents	355	1.07	0	0
Total	33,097	100.00	17	0
Valid votes	33,097	99.33		
Invalid/blank votes	223	0.67		
Total votes	33,320	100.00		
Registered voters/turnout	52,385	63.61		
Source: Nohlen
