= National Reform Movement (Antigua and Barbuda) =

Political party in Antigua and Barbuda

The National Reform Movement is a political party in Antigua and Barbuda. In the 1999 elections NRM had a single candidate, Knolly Hill, who ran in the St. Peter constituency. However, he received only 33 votes, and failed to win a seat.
