= 2004 Antiguan general election =

- 23 March 2004

All 17 seats in the House of Representatives 9 seats needed for a majority
- Turnout: 91.19% (▲27.58pp)
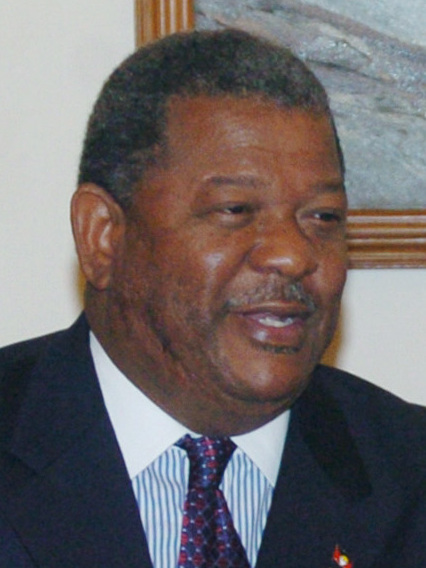

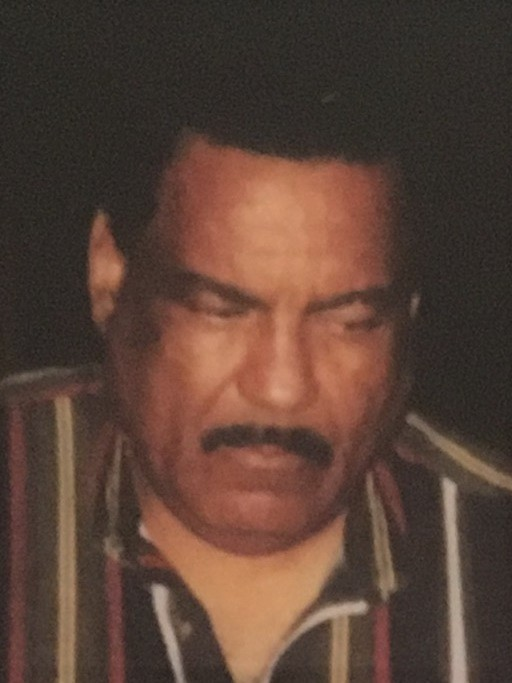

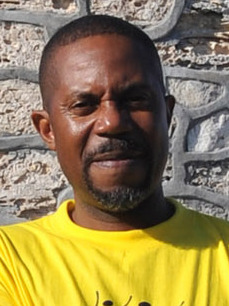
	First party	Second party	Third party
Leader	Baldwin Spencer	Lester Bird	Trevor Walker
Party	UPP	ALP	BPM
Seats won	12	4	1
Seat change	▲8	▼8	Steady
Popular vote	21,892	16,544	400
Percentage	55.50%	41.94%	1.26%
Swing	▲11.05pp	▼11.00pp	▼0.25pp
- Results by constituency
Prime Minister before election
Lester Bird
ALP
Subsequent Prime Minister
Baldwin Spencer
UPP

General elections were held in Antigua and Barbuda on 23 March 2004. The result was a victory for the opposition United Progressive Party (UPP), which defeated the incumbent Antigua Labour Party. Baldwin Spencer, leader of the UPP, replaced Lester Bird as Prime Minister of Antigua and Barbuda, with Bird being one of eight Labour MPs to lose his seat. Spencer became only the second Prime Minister from outside the Bird family or the Labour Party.

Bird had been Prime Minister since 1994, when he succeeded his father, Vere Bird, who had been Prime Minister from independence in 1981, having previously served as Chief Minister or Premier of Antigua since 1960 with the exception of the 1971–1976 period.

== Campaign ==
The Bird family was widely accused of corruption and nepotism. The Jamaica Observer noted that "Bird's government had been badly damaged by scandals that in recent years have centred on allegations of bribery, misuse of funds in the national health insurance plan, and a 13-year-old girl's charges that he and his brother used her for sex and to procure cocaine. Bird, 72, denied the last charges and organised an inquiry that found no evidence."

Bird's brother, Vere Bird, Jr., was accused of involvement with the Medellin drug cartel in 1989. He lost his Cabinet post, but was not prosecuted.

== Conduct ==
An observer team from the Caribbean Community praised the peaceful vote and said the results "clearly reflect the will of the people". Among recommendations, it urged the Electoral Commission to strengthen its independence. Previous elections in Antigua and Barbuda had been followed by allegations of electoral irregularities favouring the government.

== Results ==
The vote in the seat of Barbuda ended in a draw between the Barbuda People's Movement, an ally of the UPP, and the Barbuda People's Movement for Change, an ally of the ALP, with each candidate receiving 400 votes. A by-election was held on 20 April, which saw Trevor Walker of the BPM elected, with 408 votes against 394 for the BPMC candidate, Arthur Nibbs.

Party	Votes	%	Seats	+/–
United Progressive Party	21,892	55.50	12	+8
Antigua Labour Party	16,544	41.94	4	–8
Barbuda People's Movement	400	1.01	1	0
Barbuda People's Movement for Change	400	1.01	0	New
Independents	209	0.53	0	0
Total	39,445	100.00	17	0
Valid votes	39,445	99.54		
Invalid/blank votes	184	0.46		
Total votes	39,629	100.00		
Registered voters/turnout	43,456	91.19		
Source: Caribbean Elections
