= Barbuda Council =

Barbudan local government authority

Coordinates: 17.6416°N 61.8265°W

- Flag of the Barbuda Council

Leadership
- Chairperson: John Mussington, BPM
- Vice Chairperson: Nadia George, BPM
- MP for Barbuda: Trevor Walker, BPM
- Barbuda Council Senator: Fabian Jones, Opposition Senator
- Secretary: O'Sheri Cannegieter

Structure
- Seats: 11
- Political groups: Government (11) BPM (11)

Elections
- Voting system: First-past-the-post
- Last election: 2025
- Next election: 2027

Meeting place
- Codrington, Barbuda

Website
- https://barbudacouncil.com/

The Barbuda Council is a local authority that manages the internal affairs on the island of Barbuda. The council has the authority to buy, acquire, hold, mortgage, and dispose of land and other property. It also possesses a common seal and perpetual succession. The Barbuda Council, which has the authority outlined in the Barbuda Local Government Act, is the government of the island and its coastal zone. The members of the Senate who meet the requirements outlined in paragraph (1) of section 6 of the Barbuda Local Government Act, nine elected members, and the member of the House of Representatives from the Barbuda constituency make up the council. A Commonwealth citizen who is eighteen years of age or older, was born in Barbuda, is the child of parents who were at least one of their parents' birthplaces, or who has lived in Barbuda for at least three years prior to the date of their nomination for election, and who is a regular resident of Barbuda and a registered voter under the Representation of the People Act are all required to be eligible to be elected as a member of the council.

A person will not be allowed to be elected to the Council if they have, through their own actions, acknowledged allegiance, obedience, or adherence to a foreign power or state; if they are an undischarged bankrupt after having been declared or adjudged bankrupt in Antigua and Barbuda; if they have been certified as insane or otherwise determined to be of unsound mind under any Antigua and Barbuda law in effect; or is subject to a death sentence imposed by a court, or has been sentenced to imprisonment (by whatever name called) for a term of time exceeding twelve months and has not received a free pardon, the punishment for which he was sentenced, or any other punishment that may have been substituted therefor by competent authority; or holds or is acting in any paid office or other place of profit that is under the control or jurisdiction of the council; or is barred from election or membership in the Council under any provisions of the Barbuda Local Government Act; or maintains or is performing any public office; is a member of the Police Force or any Armed Forces of the Crown; has any interest in any contract with the Council that may be prescribed, subject to any exemptions or limitations set forth by the Legislature; stops being a Commonwealth citizen; or serves as a minister of religion.

Any elected member of the council will lose their membership and become vacant of their seat if they miss three consecutive meetings without the chairman's permission, or if they are absent from Antigua and Barbuda for longer than sixty days without permission, or if there are any other circumstances that would disqualify them from running for office. The chairman will promptly notify the minister responsible and the Supervisor of Elections in writing of the vacancy.

The Cabinet of Antigua and Barbuda may provide the council with general or specific instructions regarding the policy to be followed in the exercise of the council's powers and functions under the Barbuda Local Government Act or any other law, with the exception of the matters and things mentioned in subsection (2) of the Barbuda Local Government Act. It is be legal for an authority to consult the council on a matter if it believes that the council's cooperation and assistance would make it easier for that authority to implement or carry out any public business that is its responsibility under the Constitution, the Barbuda Local Government Act, or any other law. In that case, the council will help the relevant authority in any way it can to implement or carry out that public business. It is also legal for the council to consult with a relevant authority on any matter where the Council believes that the authority's cooperation and assistance are necessary for the council to carry out any of its duties, powers, or functions under the Barbuda Local Government Act. In that case, the relevant authority will do everything within its power to support the Council in carrying out its duties, powers, or functions.

The chairman and the Secretary's signatures must be used to validate any bylaws that the Council makes.

== History ==
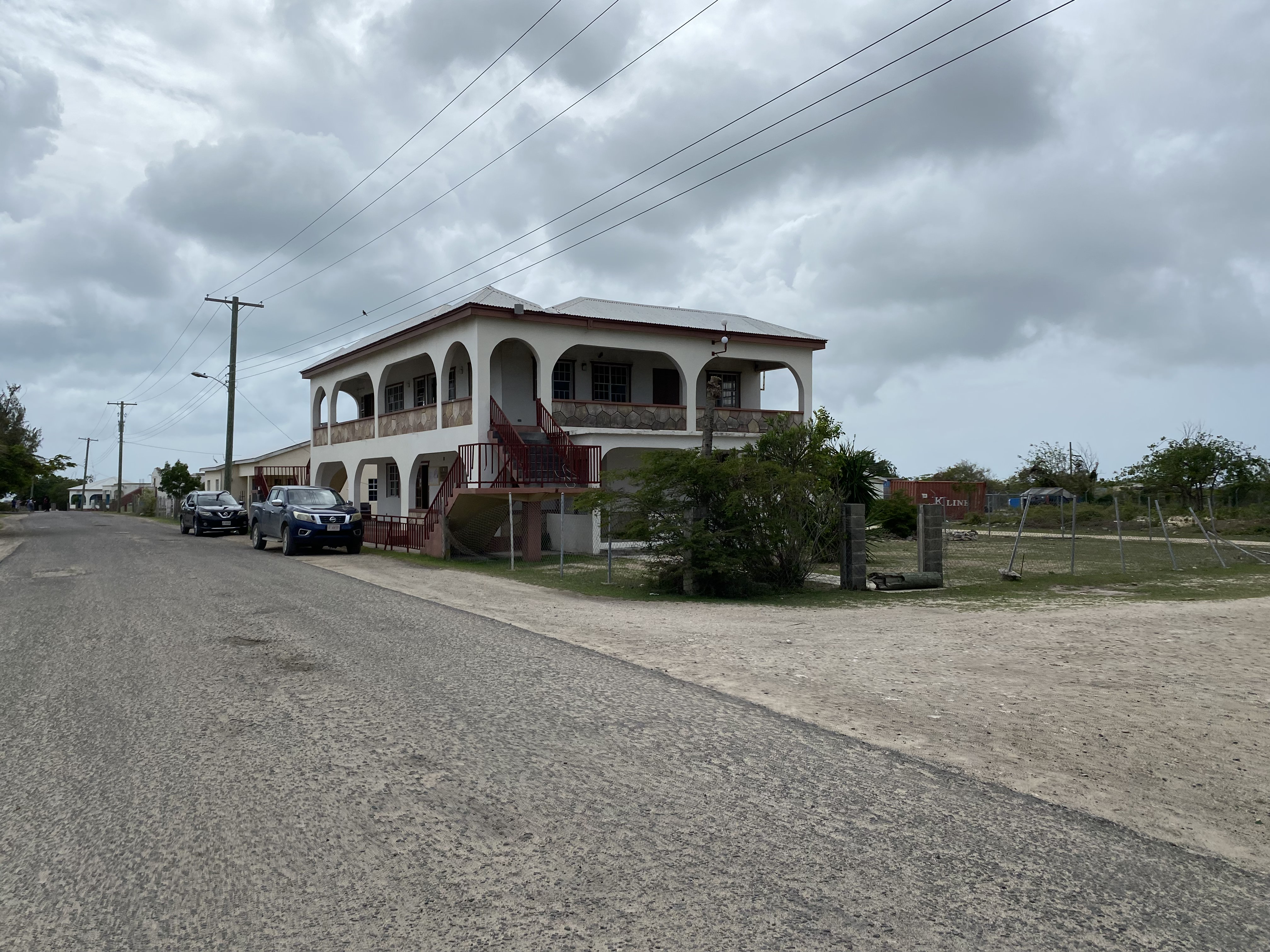
The Barbuda Council Millenium Administration Building is the main base for the Secretary of the Barbuda Council.

The Barbuda Council was established in 1976 by the Barbuda Local Government Act. It is an 11-member body consisting of nine directly elected and two ex officio (Barbuda's House and Senate representatives in the national Parliament) members who serve four-year terms.

Councillors serve for four years with elections held every two years in March.

== Committees ==
The Barbuda Council currently has five different committees: Finance, Works and General Purposes, Health, Social Welfare and Disaster, Tourism, Sports, Culture and Youth Affairs, and Agriculture, Land, Forestry, Fisheries, Coastal/Marine Protection. The council will establish a Finance Committee, a Works and General Purposes Committee, and a Health and Social Welfare Committee at its annual meeting. A council member is eligible to be appointed to multiple committees. Other committees may be appointed by the council for any general or particular reason. Except from the authority to create bylaws, collect money, adopt the yearly budget, or borrow money, the Council may assign any duties it performs to a Committee that it appoints, with or without restrictions or conditions.

== Barbuda's secession request ==
The government is taking the unprecedented step of presenting the matter to the Parliament after it received a letter from the Barbuda Council requesting that discussions commence on the separation of Barbuda from Antigua and Barbuda. In the letter dated 31 August 2020, Council Secretary, Paul Nedd, informed Cabinet Secretary, Konata Lee, that the Barbuda Council wished to secede from Antigua to determine a separate future for Barbuda and its people.

== Elections ==
The Governor-General must designate a suitable individual to serve as the Supervisor of Elections. The responsibility for overseeing and managing the overall management of elections is on the Supervisor of Elections. The Returning Officers, Presiding Officers, and Poll Clerks that may occasionally be required for the administration of elections may be appointed by the Supervisor of Elections. The register of electors for an election serves as the register for the member of the Barbuda constituency's election to the House of Representatives. Voting in the election of a Council member is open to anybody whose name is in the aforementioned register.

When the Governor-General sets a date for an election in accordance with section (13)(1) of the Barbuda Local Government Act, the Supervisor of Elections must promptly arrange for notices announcing the election to be published in the Gazette, posted on the outside doors of the Council office, any church with permission from the relevant Minister, any police station, any Government School, and in any other prominent locations they deem appropriate. The notices must be posted for a minimum of ten days prior to the election date.

The four members who received the fewest votes in the first election under the Barbuda Local Government Act will retire from office after two years, but they will be eligible to run again. In order to fill the seats left empty by the retiring members, an election will be held on a date that the Governor-General appoints within eight weeks of the date of the members' retirement. Following the election held in accordance with subsection (I) of the Barbuda Local Government Act, the five elected members who had not yet retired will take office and be eligible for reelection. Subsequent elections will then be held at regular intervals of two years between each election, and the members will retire in rotation at each alternate election in groups of four or five, as may be appropriate, with each retiring group of members always being eligible for reelection. The tenure for an elected member of the Barbuda Council is four years.

A two-thirds majority of the council's members may vote in favor of a motion requesting the council's dissolution at any time.

The Elections Rules included in the First Schedule to the Representation of the People Act apply to elections held under the Barbuda Local Government Act if no rules have been made by the Cabinet, which has the authority to make regulations to govern the conduct of elections under the Barbuda Local Government Act.

== Chair of the Barbuda Council ==
In January of every year, the council must elect a chairperson and a deputy chairperson before the Barbuda Council proceeds with any other business. In a year where an election is held, at the first sitting of the council after the election, this is also an instance where the council must elect a chairperson and a deputy chairperson. If the chairperson or the deputy chairperson resigns, dies, or becomes disqualified from serving in the council, the vacancy must be filled by an election of a new chairperson or deputy chairperson. If the chairperson is to resign from the council, the chairperson must address a note to the secretary of the council.

== Members ==
Members of the Council
Member	Last elected	Party
Devon Warner	2023	BPM
John Mussington	2023	BPM
Sharima Deazle	2023	BPM
Fitzroy Warner	2023	BPM
Wayde Burton	2025	BPM
Melanie Beazer	2025	BPM
Jacklyn Frank	2025	BPM
Nico Antonio	2025	BPM
Nadia George	2025	BPM
Trevor Walker	Ex officio	BPM
Fabian Jones	Ex officio	BPM

== Duties and powers of the Council ==
Waters under the jurisdiction of the Barbuda Council

=== Duties ===
The Barbuda Council has the following duties:

- to administer agriculture and forestry,
- to administer public health, medical and sanitary facilities and services,
- to administer public utilities,
- to manage roadworks,
- to collect revenues for its operations
- to improve and maintain public buildings, wharves, and harbour facilities,
- to encourage the development of tourism and hotels,
- to administer fisheries,
- to protect public buildings,
- to apply monies collected by the council to maintain public works and public places,
- to keep accounts of all assessments made,
- to deliver copies of all such accounts, once per year, to the auditor-general,
- to make detailed lists of houses and lots of land, and owners and occupants, and
- to perform other duties required by the Barbuda Local Government Act or by a by-law.

=== The power to make by-laws ===
The council has the power to make by-laws, with respect to the following:

- the dates and procedures for holding meetings, the members' presence and the format and sequence of discussions at such sessions, the selection and establishment of committees, the rules governing committee proceedings, and the conduct of business of the council and its committees;
- the designation of streets and roads, their regular maintenance, their breadth, and any other roadways placed under the council's jurisdiction;
- the suppression, abatement, removal, or cessation of any nuisance, as well as the management and disposal of sewage matter;
- the collection and removal of home trash from properties, as well as the cleanliness of public areas or destinations for the general public;
- the number and types of animals, birds, and beasts that may be kept by one individual, as well as the destruction of insects and the importation and exportation of livestock;
- the establishment of pounds, their regulation, and the imposition of pounds fees;
- creating and governing marketplaces, slaughterhouses, and the charges for fairs, sales, and the peddling of cattle, produce, or any other items;
- the killing of animals whose flesh is destined for human consumption, as well as the inspection and sale of livestock, meat, fish, vegetables, and other foodstuffs and beverages;
- the construction, maintenance, and control of public restrooms, public washing facilities, and other hygienic problems;
- the establishment of public cemeteries, their administration and maintenance, as well as the charging of fees for grave openings, burials, and the erection of monuments there;
- the construction of structures to serve as theaters, the payment of related license fees, and public entertainment and performances;
- the oversight and maintenance of public parks, cultural institutions, and other recreational areas;
- regulating the sale and storage of hazardous or combustible materials;
- the provision of tour guides and the elimination of beggars and idlers who disturb tourists;
- the installation of water tanks or other rainwater collection devices on any property, whether they are already there or are slated to be built;
- controlling any other public utilities that the Council may from time to time establish or that the Government, any other organization, or any person may transfer to the council, as well as the levying and collection of fees, rates, and charges therefor;
- governing traffic on streets and roads covered by the Vehicles and Road Traffic Act's requirements and any rules imposed thereunder;
- regulating mobile refreshment vans and carts, itinerant traders and vendors, aerated water factories, restaurants and other eating establishments, and levying fees, rates, and taxes on all of the aforementioned entities;
- the control and regulation of vacant building sites;
- the imposition of rates and taxes on all land and structures in the Island, with the exception of those vested in the monarch and used for government purposes;
- grounds for provision;
- defense against fire;
- prohibition of and limitations on the importing of cotton seed from Antigua;
- infectious conditions;
- chopping wood, burning charcoal, and burning lime;
- shooting game, including deer;
- licenses for dogs, boats, and livestock;
- alcohol licenses;
- tanners and other businesses;
- roadways and fences;
- coasting business;
- fishing;
- the buying and selling of cotton, corn, crops in general, and of skins and meat;
- lighting;
- the height above earth that buildings' foundations must be raised;
- the maximum number of people that may live in a dwelling, as well as the minimum size and ventilation requirements for each room;
- securing the space or territory around each building;
- the row of structures bordering or otherwise on a road or route;
- the designation of building numbers and building lots, the design and materials of new buildings' foundations, walls, and roofs, the process for renovating or rebuilding older structures, particularly with regard to the materials used, and the closing, removal, or demolition of dilapidated or dangerous structures.

The Council may create bylaws with regard to despite the Public Utilities Act's restrictions such as the following:

- regulating the distribution and supply of water to any property on the island for sanitary, household, and commercial uses;
- minimizing waste and water contamination in such areas;
- managing the distribution and supply of electricity to all buildings on the island;
- the charging of fees for the provision of electricity and water to any premises, the collection of such fees, and the procedure for collecting unpaid fees from people who have fallen behind on their payments.

By-laws made by the Barbuda Council may apply penalties not exceeding 250 dollars or 3 months imprisonment. By-laws made pursuant to section 19 of the Barbuda Local Government Act and duly published in the Gazette have full force and effect within Barbuda; however, they shall only operate in addition to and not in derogation of any other Antigua and Barbuda law or of any power granted by any other law to any person or authority and exercisable with respect to Antigua and Barbuda, unless expressly or by necessary implication provided under the Act or any other law from time to time in force in Antigua and Barbuda, with the caveat that the Council must arrange for a copy of the proposed bylaw to be published in three consecutive editions of the Gazette prior to making a bylaw under the section.

=== Barbuda Act ===
Under the Barbuda Act, additional powers have been granted to the council. The Council may also enforce certain Barbuda-related offenses on Antigua.

== See also ==
- Antigua and Barbuda
- Commonwealth Local Government Forum-Americas
- Law of Barbuda
