= Barbuda People's Movement =

Barbudan separatist political party in Antigua and Barbuda

- Abbreviation: BPM
- Leader: Trevor Walker
- Founded: 1978
- Youth wing: BPM Youth Foundation
- Ideology: Barbudan separatism Barbudan nationalism Democratic socialism
- Political position: Center-left to left-wing
- Seats in the Barbuda Council: 11 / 11
- Seats in the House of Representatives (Barbuda seat): 1 / 1
- Seats in the Senate (Barbuda seats): 1 / 2

Website
- http://barbudapeoplesmovement.org

The Barbuda People's Movement (BPM) is a left-wing Barbudan nationalist and separatist political party in Antigua and Barbuda active only on the island of Barbuda. The party's symbol is the European fallow deer, national animal of Barbuda. The party seeks the secession of Barbuda from Antigua and Barbuda. The party is allied with the United Progressive Party, being part of its coalition government between 2004 and 2014.

== History ==
The BPM opposed the 1981 independence agreement and its leader Hilbourne Frank was elected in 1989 as the party's sole deputy.

They held the seat in the 1994 and 1999. In the 2004 elections the candidates of the BPM (Trevor Walker) and the Barbuda People's Movement for Change both won 400 votes. In a rerun of the election on 20 April Walker received 408 votes, whilst BPMC candidate Arthur Nibbs won only 394. Walker was then the first BPM deputy to be appointed to government, as a member of Baldwin Spencer's cabninet. The party retained the seat in the 2009 elections.

== Barbuda’s secession request ==
The government is taking the unprecedented step of presenting the matter to the Parliament after it received a letter from the Barbuda Council requesting that discussions commence on the separation of Barbuda from Antigua.

In the letter dated 31 August 2020, Council Secretary Paul Nedd informed Cabinet Secretary Konata Lee that the Barbuda Council wished to secede from Antigua in order to determine a separate future for Barbuda and its people.

== Election results ==
=== House of Representatives ===
Election	Party leader	Votes	%	Seats	+/–	Position	Government
1989	Hilbourne Frank	304	1.37	1 / 17	New	4th	Opposition
1994	Hilbourne Frank	367	1.35	1 / 17	0	▲3rd	Opposition
1999	Hilbourne Frank	418	1.26	1 / 17	0	3rd	Opposition
2004 (Note: The initial result for the Barbudan seat was a tie between the BPM and the Barbuda People's Movement for Change, necesitating a re-run which led to the BPM winning.)	Trevor Walker	400	1.01	1 / 17	0	3rd	Coalition
2009	Trevor Walker	474	1.14	1 / 17	0	3rd	Coalition
2014	Trevor Walker	484	1.13	0 / 17	▼1	3rd	Extra-parliamentary
2018	Trevor Walker	558	1.43	1 / 17	▲1	▼4th	Opposition
2023	Trevor Walker	624	1.46	1 / 17	0	▲3rd	Opposition
2026	Trevor Walker	616	1.57	1 / 17	0	3rd	Opposition

=== Barbuda Council ===
Election	Leaders	Votes			Seats		Position	Government
Election	Leaders	No.	%	±	No.	±	Position	Government
1979	Hilbourne Frank					New	1st	Majority
1981	Hilbourne Frank						1st	Majority
1983	Hilbourne Frank						1st	Majority
1985	Hilbourne Frank							ONR
1987	Hilbourne Frank				5 / 9		1st	Majority
1989	Hilbourne Frank				9 / 9	▲4	1st	Majority
1991/1992	Hilbourne Frank						1st	Majority
1993/1994	Hilbourne Frank						1st	Majority
1996	Hilbourne Frank						▼2nd	ABLP
1997	Hilbourne Frank						▲1st	Majority
1999	Hilbourne Frank						1st	Majority
2001	Hilbourne Frank						1st	Majority
2003	Hilbourne Frank						1st	Majority
2005	Trevor Walker	1,988	53.96				1st	Majority
2007	Trevor Walker						1st	Majority
2009	Trevor Walker						1st	Majority
2011	Trevor Walker	1,679	48.78				1st	Majority
2013	Trevor Walker	1,994	46.49		5 / 11		▼2nd	ABLP
2015	Trevor Walker				3 / 11	▼2	2nd	ABLP
2017	Trevor Walker	2,983	51.66		5 / 11	▲2	2nd	ABLP
2019	Trevor Walker				11 / 11	▲4	▲1st	Majority
2021	Trevor Walker	2,303	63.18		11 / 11	0	1st	Majority
2023	Trevor Walker	2,636	63.85		11 / 11	0	1st	Majority
2025	Trevor Walker	2,259	62.18		11 / 11	0	1st	Majority
