= Trevor Walker =

Antigua and Barbuda politician

The Honourable Trevor Myke Walker
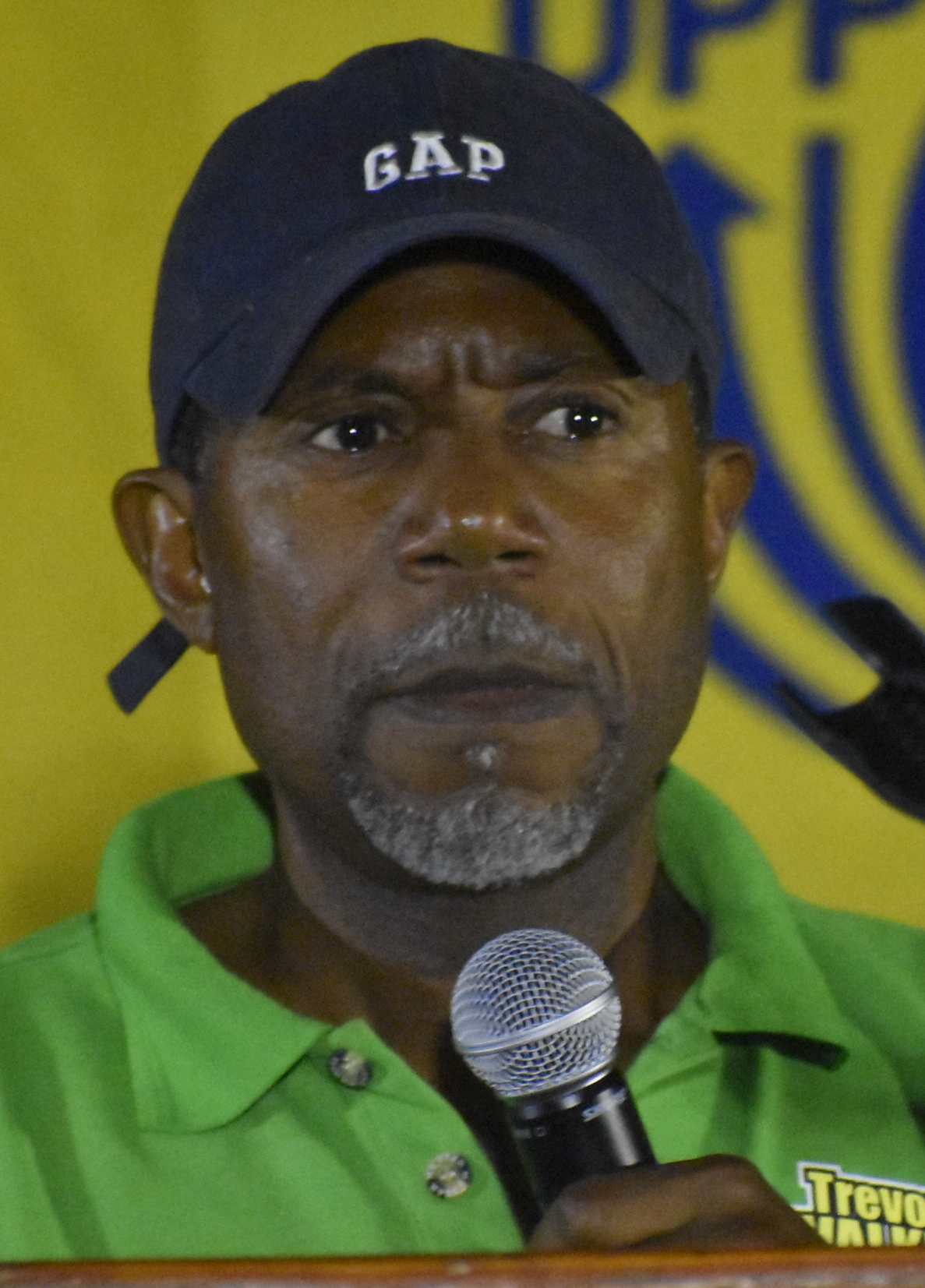

Member of the Antigua and Barbuda Parliament for Barbuda
- Incumbent
- Assumed office 21 March 2018
- Monarchs: Elizabeth II; Charles III
- Governor-General: Rodney Williams
- In office 20 April 2004 – 12 June 2014
- Monarch: Elizabeth II
- Governor-General: Louise Lake-Tack

Minister of State in the Office of the Prime Minister, responsible for Barbuda Affairs
- In office 26 April 2004 – 31 December 2006

Vice Chairperson of the Barbuda Council
- In office 2019–2023

Minister of State in the Office of the Prime Minister, responsible for Public Utilities, Energy, and Barbuda Affairs
- In office 1 April 2007 – 15 March 2009

Minister of Works and Transport
- In office 16 March 2009 – 12 June 2014

Acting Prime Minister of Antigua and Barbuda
- In office November 22, 2012 – Unknown

Personal details
- Born: Barbuda
- Party: Barbuda People's Movement
- Education: Saint Leo University
- Occupation: Economist

Trevor Myke Walker is a Barbudan politician, current member of parliament for Barbuda, and former Cabinet Minister under the Baldwin Spencer administration. He is a member of the Barbuda People's Movement, a party that seeks the independence of Barbuda from Antigua and Barbuda.

Walker was elected to the Barbuda Council in 2001, marking his political debut. After being elected to the House of Representatives three years later, he was given the position of Minister of State in responsible for Barbuda Affairs. After that, in 2009, Walker was named minister of works and transport, where he was in charge of building Antigua's largest supermarket, the Epicurean Supermarket. Walker later lost his position in parliament following the 2014 loss of the United Progressive Party.

Walker later made a return to parliament following the 2018 snap election that followed Hurricane Irma and produced a significant victory for the Barbuda People's Movement. Since then, Walker has served as a front-bencher for the opposition in parliament. He also serves as vice chair of the Barbuda Council and chair of the finance committee. Walker's handling of the Barbuda Land Act and Barbuda's 2020 secession request has drawn harsh criticism from the Labour Party, particularly from Gaston Browne and Steadroy Benjamin. Walker's endorsement of the creation of a twin-island federation in Antigua and Barbuda has also drawn strong condemnation from the Labour Party.

== Early career ==
Trevor Walker is the leader of the Barbuda People's Movement, member of parliament for Barbuda, and former vice chairperson of the Barbuda Council.

In 2001, Trevor Walker was elected to serve on the Barbuda Council, and in 2004, he ran for the seat that would represent Barbuda in the House of Representatives of Antigua and Barbuda. In 2004, he tied for the election, but after a recount, he was declared the winner. Additionally, he was victorious in the elections held in 2009, 2018, but he was defeated by the Antigua and Barbuda Labour Party in 2014. In the 2023 general elections Walker was elected again to the House of Representatives for the Barbuda Constituency as BPM candidate.

As a result of the absence of Baldwin Spencer and Harold Lovell, who both typically served in the role of acting prime minister, Trevor Walker became the first Barbudan to be appointed to the position of acting prime minister in the year 2012. This was due to the fact that Baldwin Spencer and Harold Lovell typically filled this role.

== Post-Irma (2017-2018) ==
Concerning the matter of Barbuda Land, the central government has been awarded a significant victory by the courts. The application that had been brought before the High Court by a group of Barbudans who wanted to prevent the implementation of the amendment to the Barbuda Land Act was turned down by the court. Claimants in the case, including John Mussington, Trevor Walker, Devon Warner, and Lilrose Burton, sought permission to begin judicial review and an interim injunction restraining the government from proceeding with the passage of the law. In addition, the claimants asked for an injunction to prevent the law from taking effect immediately. They argued that since the Barbuda Land Management Amendment Act 2017 was passed without the consent of the Barbuda Council or the people of Barbuda, it violates the law and is therefore unconstitutional. They had filed the lawsuit against the Hon. Gaston Browne, who was serving as Prime Minister, and the Hon. Steadroy Benjamin, who was serving as Attorney General. However, in a decision handed down by the High Court Justice Clare Henry, it was determined that the applicants did not succeed in presenting an argument that would warrant the court's intervention prior to the law's implementation. The judge referred to a precedent-setting decision made by the Privy Council in the United Kingdom, which held that the court should, to the greatest extent possible, refrain from interfering with the pre-enactment legislative process. Importantly, the court determined that the plan referred to by the Prime Minister is for the people of Barbuda to be given free-hold title and for the government to make arrangements for mortgages for those who want them. The court came to the conclusion that there is no evidence to suggest that the claimants are precluded from receiving relief by challenging the law after it has been enacted.

Five members of Council went to their administrative office to have their first meeting of 2018, but a NODS representative allegedly refused to let them occupy a room, and the representative later called for support from the police and the defense force. In videos that had gone viral on social media, Council member Trevor Walker can be seen engaging in a heated argument with members of the military. An apology was required after it was alleged that residents of Barbuda showed disrespect to a member of the military, and it was promptly provided in response to the demand. The members of the Council got together for their meeting after having a discussion with Major Alando Michael, who is in charge of the NODS operations. Members of the Council who are affiliated with the Barbuda People's Movement have stated that they have no objections to the NODS official using the building as a temporary place of employment and that they have no problem with the arrangement. However, they claimed that their issue is that they are unable to enter the building ever since September 2017, when Hurricane Irma caused widespread destruction on the island.

In May 2018, the Prime Minister stated that any attempts to consult with the people of Barbuda regarding the Land Act issue would be fruitless given the steadfast stance taken by the Barbuda member of Parliament. This statement was made in reference to the issue of the Land Act. Gaston Browne, the Prime Minister of Antigua and Barbuda, responded to calls for consultation with Barbudans before moving forward while he was speaking in Parliament during the debate to repeal the Barbuda Land Act. The invitation to participate in the consultation was extended by Jamale Pringle, the leader of the Opposition, and Trevor Walker, a member of the Parliament for Barbuda. Browne, on the other hand, stated that the government had the ability to consult with Barbudans but chose not to do so because bringing up the issue would have caused contention. "How do you consult in those conditions when you are being threatened? We are not stupid; we know that if we call a consultation about land reform in Barbuda at any time, they will disrupt the meeting in some way." Because of the way that they have brainwashed the people of Barbuda, we are aware of the fact that there is no means by which you can engage Barbudans in an intellectually honest conversation about land reform. He affirmed that it would not have taken place. Browne stated that he and his minister desired to talk about it when they were invited to a meeting at the American University of Antigua campus following Hurricane Irma in the past year. According to him, there were approximately 1,300 people from the island of Barbuda gathered there; however, having a conversation about the land issue was difficult. Browne continued by saying, "Just about a week ago, or within the last two weeks in this honorable house, the member for Barbuda threatened myself and other members here saying that any attempts to make any changes to the Barbuda Land Act can't happen; over his dead body." He predicted that there would be fighting." The Crown Lands Regulation Amendment Bill of 2018 is the legislation that will result in the repeal of the Barbuda Land Act of 2007. It was approved by the House of Representatives, and it was later decided by the Senate. One of the positions taken by the government that is currently in power, which is led by the Antigua Barbuda Labour Party (ABLP), is that the prohibition on land ownership that was stipulated in the Land Act of 2007 is a barrier to a real estate and property market that could contribute to the economy of the sister isle. Additionally, the ABLP has argued on multiple occasions that freehold ownership is more advantageous for Barbudans because it will allow them to apply for loans to rebuild their homes.

It was announced in May 2018 that employees of the Barbuda Council who do not return to the sister island to participate in the reconstruction process will be terminated from their positions after a predetermined amount of time has passed. When the council gathered on Barbuda's sister island, Antigua, on Wednesday morning to select members who will sit on the various committees, Trevor Walker, a member of parliament for Barbuda, made his position perfectly clear. The Council came to the conclusion that workers who remain in Antigua should not be compensated by the Barbuda Council beginning on July 1, 2018. Since the Barbuda Council office in Antigua has shut down, there is no point in anyone attempting to remain in that country in order to continue working there. "The Barbuda Council cannot continue to operate in the same manner in which it has been operating, which consists of paying people in Antigua who do not want to come back here to do nothing," warned Walker. In addition to this, he went a step further and announced that the revenue from the sand mining industry, which is currently helping to subsidize Dove Cove operations in Antigua, will soon no longer be available. The member of parliament from Barbuda stated that he just recently came across this information after conducting investigations into the expenditure of the money made from sand mining for a number of months. Sand mining has started up again on Barbuda, in spite of the numerous complaints that have been lodged by environmentalists. "Why should our sand money be used to pay Dove Cove's bill when Council workers are not getting paid? " According to Walker's declaration, "as soon as this Council is established, we are going to make a decision immediately to stop it, and people have to tell us who gave them the authority to send that money to Dove Cove." Clifton Francois, who runs the Barbuda Channel, uploaded a live video of the meeting to Facebook so that viewers could watch it there. Councillors who were present were informed, among other things, that the operation of the Council had been reduced to five committees due to financial constraints, and that the membership on those committees had also been reduced to reflect this change. Walker also disclosed that the Antigua and Barbuda Labour Party (ABLP) allowances that were just recently approved will be subject to review by the new council that has been appointed.

== 2019-present ==
When it was announced that the four candidates fielded by the Barbuda's People Movement (BPM) had prevailed, the large crowd that had gathered outside the Sir McChesney George Secondary School around 10:15 on the evening of March 27, 2019, in Barbuda responded with a roar of approval. They were trying to win as many seats as possible on the Barbuda Council, which is the sister island's local governing body. If they were successful, it would have been a resounding victory for the party that is currently led by MP Trevor Walker, who also serves on the council. On election day, the polls opened promptly at seven in the morning at Sir McChesney George Secondary School (SMSS), which is located in the Indigo neighborhood of Codrington.

In August 2020 on the island of Barbuda, there was a commotion that involved Walker outside of the Palmetto Point development that was part of the PLH project. Trevor Walker, a member of parliament for the island of Barbuda, was very upset with the project's head of security, and he yelled at him using an expletive. He had a problem with a decision that only elected members of the Barbuda Council would be permitted for a site visit that was approved.

Samantha Marshall, the former representative for St. Mary's South in Parliament, delivered an impassioned speech in 2021 in the Lower House in which she criticized the work of Trevor Walker, the representative for Barbuda in Parliament.

On 29 March 2023, BPM Leader Trevor Walker has stated that they "will continue to fight," despite the fact that they appear to have exhausted all legal avenues available to them in their attempt to stop the selling of lands in Barbuda. Walker was one of two people who brought a case against the Attorney General arguing that lands on the sister isle are owned in common; however, he and Mackenzie Frank lost their case at the country's final appellate court last June, which paved the way for the central government to proceed with the Barbuda land registry. Walker was one of the two people who brought the case against the Attorney General; Mackenzie Frank was the other.

In the local elections that took place on March 29th, 2023, the BPM, which was led by Trevor Walker, emerged victorious.

== Personal life ==
Walker was educated at the Holy Trinity School in Barbuda, and Saint Leo University in Florida.

== See also ==
- Gaston Browne
- Jamale Pringle
- Harold Lovell
