= Antigua and Barbuda Labour Party =

Centre-right political party in Antigua and Barbuda

- Abbreviation: ABLP
- Leader: Gaston Browne
- Founder: V.C. Bird
- Founded: 18 May 1946
- Ideology: Economic liberalism; Anti-federalism; Republicanism; 1964–1976: Social democracy; Labourism
- Political position: Centre-right
- International affiliation: Socialist International (historical, consultative)
- Seats in the House of Representatives: 15 / 17
- Seats in the Senate: 11 / 17
- Seats in the Barbuda Council: 0 / 11

Website
- ablpantigua.com

The Antigua and Barbuda Labour Party (ABLP) is a political party in Antigua and Barbuda. The current leader of the party is Gaston Browne, who serves as the prime minister of Antigua and Barbuda. The party was previously led by Lester Bird, who was chairman of the party from 1971, and was prime minister and political leader in 1994. While its name suggests that it is a centre-left social democratic party, the ABLP is actually a centre-right conservative party, similar to the Jamaica Labour Party in Jamaica.

== History ==
The party was founded in 1946, during the first national elections, as the Antigua Labour Party (ALP). Its founders included Vere Bird, father of Lester. The ABLP later came to be seen as a political arm of the Bird family. With the exception of five years in the 1970s, the ABLP ruled Antigua and Barbuda for over four decades leading up to 2004. It was in the opposition from 2004 to 2014, and then returned to power in the 2014 general election.

=== 2004 defeat ===
Two major events precipitated the ABLP's first defeat in 28 years in the 2004 elections. First, an Electoral Commission was introduced after the 1999 election. According to international observers, the 1999 election was rife with irregularities. The report from an observer group from across the Commonwealth concluded that "voting rolls appeared to be inflated" and recommended "the establishment of an independent electoral commission to improve the voter registration process." Second, in 2002 there was a scandal over medical benefits, in which the government failed to contribute EC$120 million to cover recipients' medical expenses.

The opposition United Progressive Party campaigned on an anti-corruption platform they called "Government in the Sunshine". The ABLP lost its majority in the general election held on 24 March 2004. It received 41.8% of the popular vote, but won only four out of 17 seats. ABLP Prime Minister and political leader Bird was also defeated in his constituency.

=== Leadership crisis and transition ===
In early 2009, the Antigua and Barbuda Labour Party faced an internal leadership crisis. There was speculation that even if the ABLP won the 2009 election, Bird's leadership would be challenged. He announced that, if the ABLP failed to win the forthcoming 2009 general election, he would step down. Nevertheless, despite not winning, he remained the ABLP's leader until 2012, when he was defeated by Gaston Browne in a leadership challenge.

=== 2014 elections and return to government ===
The Antigua and Barbuda Labour Party won 14 of the 17 seats in the Legislature in the 2014 general elections, forming a majority government with Browne as Prime Minister. They won 15 seats in the 2018 general elections and thereby retained power.

== Ideology ==
Despite having been founded as a partisan expression of the labour movement in Antigua and Barbuda and having labour and social democratic origins, the party is generally considered as an economically liberal and fiscally conservative party, defender of a market-oriented economy and tax reductions, in particular rejecting the imposition of income tax. However, the party's policy of maintaining the public sector as the largest employer in Antigua and Barbuda during its successive governments (representing up to 40% of the workforce) has also led to the party being considered a guarantor of a "paternalistic conservatism" or "right-wing socialism". After the death of Elizabeth II of Antigua and Barbuda, the party went on to officially support the conversion of Antigua and Barbuda into a republic. The party is also against an Antiguan and Barbudan federation.

The party has a relatively progressive stance on LGBTQ rights in the country, with Browne repeatedly calling on LGBTQ voters in the country to support his party ahead of the 2026 election and accusing the UPP of homophobia. Browne's government appointed the first known LGBTQ rights activist to the Senate, Aziza Lake, and did not challenge a 2023 court ruling legalising same-sex sexual activity, with Browne stating: "[a]s a government, we have a constitutional responsibility to respect the rights of all and not to discriminate." This has caused significant tensions within the party however.

== Electoral results ==
=== House of Representatives ===
Election	Party leader	Votes	%	Seats	+/–	Position	Government
1951	Vere Bird	4,182	87.4	8 / 8	New	1st	Majority
1956	Vere Bird	5,509	86.7	8 / 8	0	1st	Majority
1960	Vere Bird	2,128	85.0	10 / 10	▲2	1st	Majority
1965	Vere Bird	7,275	78.9	10 / 10	0	1st	Majority
1971	Vere Bird	6,409	37.9	4 / 17	▼6	▼2nd	Opposition
1976	Vere Bird	12,056	49.0	11 / 17	▲7	▲1st	Majority
1980	Vere Bird	12,794	58.0	13 / 17	▲2	1st	Majority
1984	Vere Bird	12,972	67.9	16 / 17	▲3	1st	Majority
1989	Vere Bird	14,207	63.9	15 / 17	▼1	1st	Majority
1994	Lester Bird	14,763	54.4	11 / 17	▼4	1st	Majority
1999	Lester Bird	17,521	52.6	12 / 17	▲1	1st	Majority
2004	Lester Bird	16,534	41.9	4 / 17	▼8	▼2nd	Opposition
2009	Lester Bird	19,657	46.9	7 / 17	▲3	▼2nd	Opposition
2014	Gaston Browne	24,212	56.5	14 / 17	▲7	▲1st	Majority
2018	Gaston Browne	23,063	59.24	15 / 17	▲1	1st	Majority
2023	Gaston Browne	20,052	47.1	9 / 17	▼6	1st	Majority
2026	Gaston Browne	23,818	60.8	15 / 17	▲6	1st	Majority

=== Barbuda Council ===
Election	Leaders	Votes			Seats		Position	Government
Election	Leaders	No.	%	±	No.	±	Position	Government
1976	Vere Bird							
1979	Vere Bird							BPM
1981	Vere Bird							BPM
1983	Vere Bird							BPM
1985	Vere Bird							ONR
1987	Vere Bird							BPM
1989	Vere Bird							BPM
1991/1992	Vere Bird							BPM
1993/1994	Vere Bird							BPM
1996	Lester Bird						▲1st	Majority
1997	Lester Bird							BPM
1999	Lester Bird							BPM
2001	Lester Bird							BPM
2003	Lester Bird							BPM
2005	Lester Bird							BPM
2007	Lester Bird						2nd	BPM
2009	Lester Bird							BPM
2011	Lester Bird	1,680	48.81				2nd	BPM
2013	Gaston Browne	2,295	53.51		6 / 11		▲1st	Majority
2015	Gaston Browne				8 / 11	▲2	1st	Majority
2017	Gaston Browne	2,791	48.34		6 / 11	▼2	1st	Majority
2019	Gaston Browne				2 / 11	▼4	▼2nd	BPM
2021	Gaston Browne	1,319	36.19		2 / 11	2	2nd	BPM

== See also ==
- Category:Antigua and Barbuda Labour Party politicians
