= List of members of the House of Representatives (Antigua and Barbuda) =

This is a list of members of the House of Representatives, the lower house of the Parliament of Antigua and Barbuda.

== Party affiliation ==
Affiliation	Members
Antigua and Barbuda Labour Party	15
United Progressive Party	1
Barbuda People's Movement	1
Total	17

== Leadership ==
Position	Representative	Source
Speaker of the House of Representatives	Osbert Frederick	
Deputy Speaker of the House of Representatives	Philmore Benjamin	
Prime Minister	Gaston Browne	
Attorney-General	Steadroy Benjamin	
Leader of the Opposition	Jamale Pringle	
Deputy Leader of the Opposition	–	

== List of members ==
Last elected: 30 April 2026

Constituency	Representative	Party	Assumed office
St. John's City West	Gaston Browne	Labour	9 March 1999
St. John's City South	Steadroy Benjamin	Labour	8 March 1994
St. John's Rural East	Maria Bird-Browne	Labour	21 March 2018
St. Philip's North	Randy Baltimore	Labour	27 March 2026
St. Mary's North	Philmore Benjamin	Labour	30 April 2026
St. John's Rural South	Daryll Matthew	Labour	21 March 2018
St. Paul	Paul Chet Greene	Labour	13 June 2014
St. John's Rural North	Charles Fernandez	Labour	12 March 2009
St. John's City East	Melford Nicholas	Labour	13 June 2014
All Saints East & St. Luke	Jamale Pringle	United Progressive Party	21 March 2018
St. Philip's South	Kiz Johnson	Labour	30 April 2026
St. John's Rural West	Michael Joseph	Labour	30 April 2026
St. Mary's South	Dwayne George	Labour	30 April 2026
St. George	Michael Freeland	Labour	30 April 2026
Barbuda	Trevor Walker	Barbuda People's Movement	21 March 2018
St. Peter	Rawdon Turner	Labour	15 January 2025
All Saints West	Anthony Smith	Labour	18 January 2023
None (speaker)	Osbert Frederick	–	18 November 2024
