= 2023 Antiguan general election =

- 18 January 2023

All 17 seats in the House of Representatives 9 seats needed for a majority
- Turnout: 70.34 (▼6.17pp)
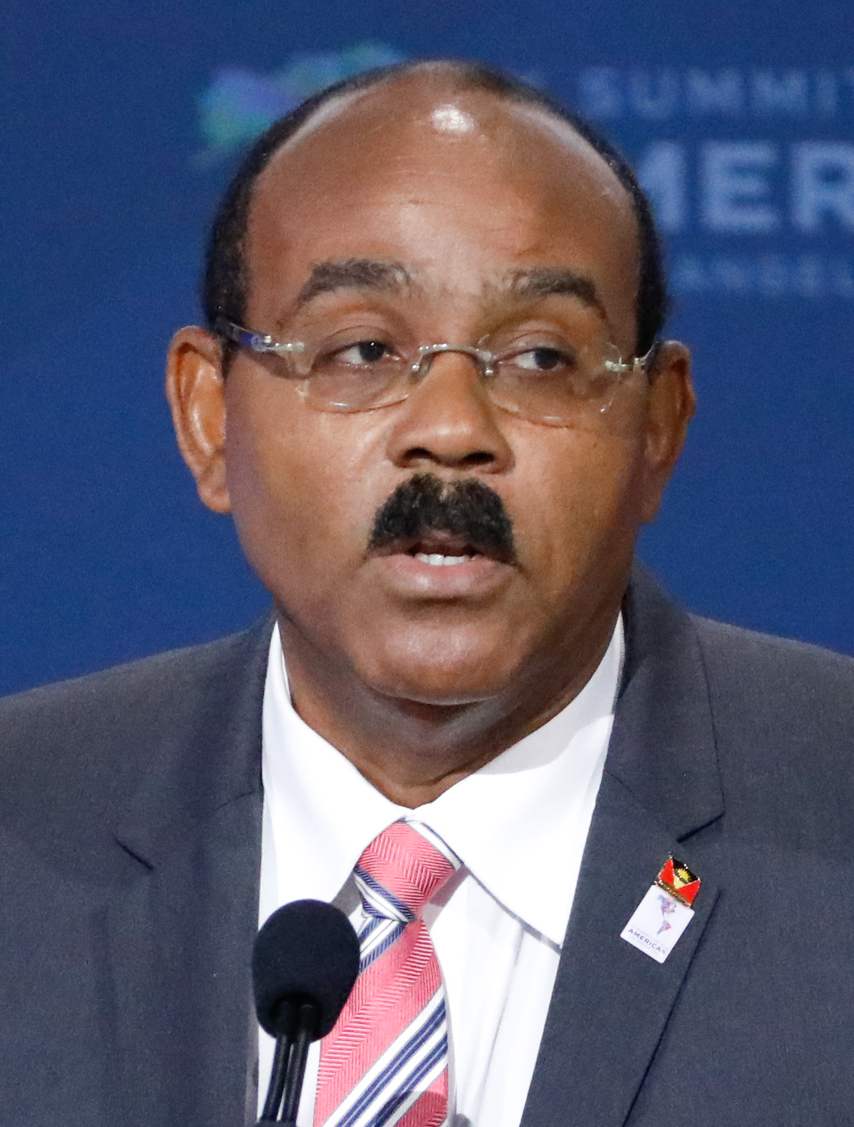

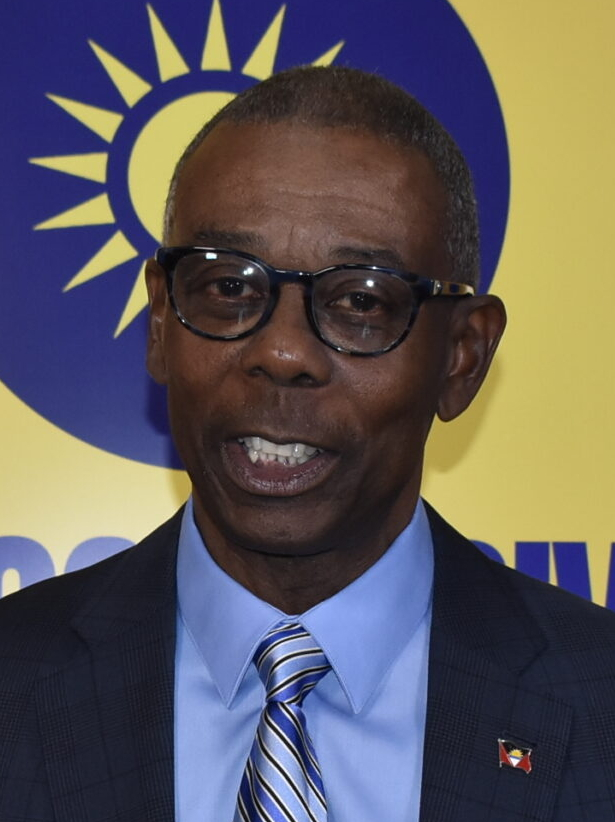

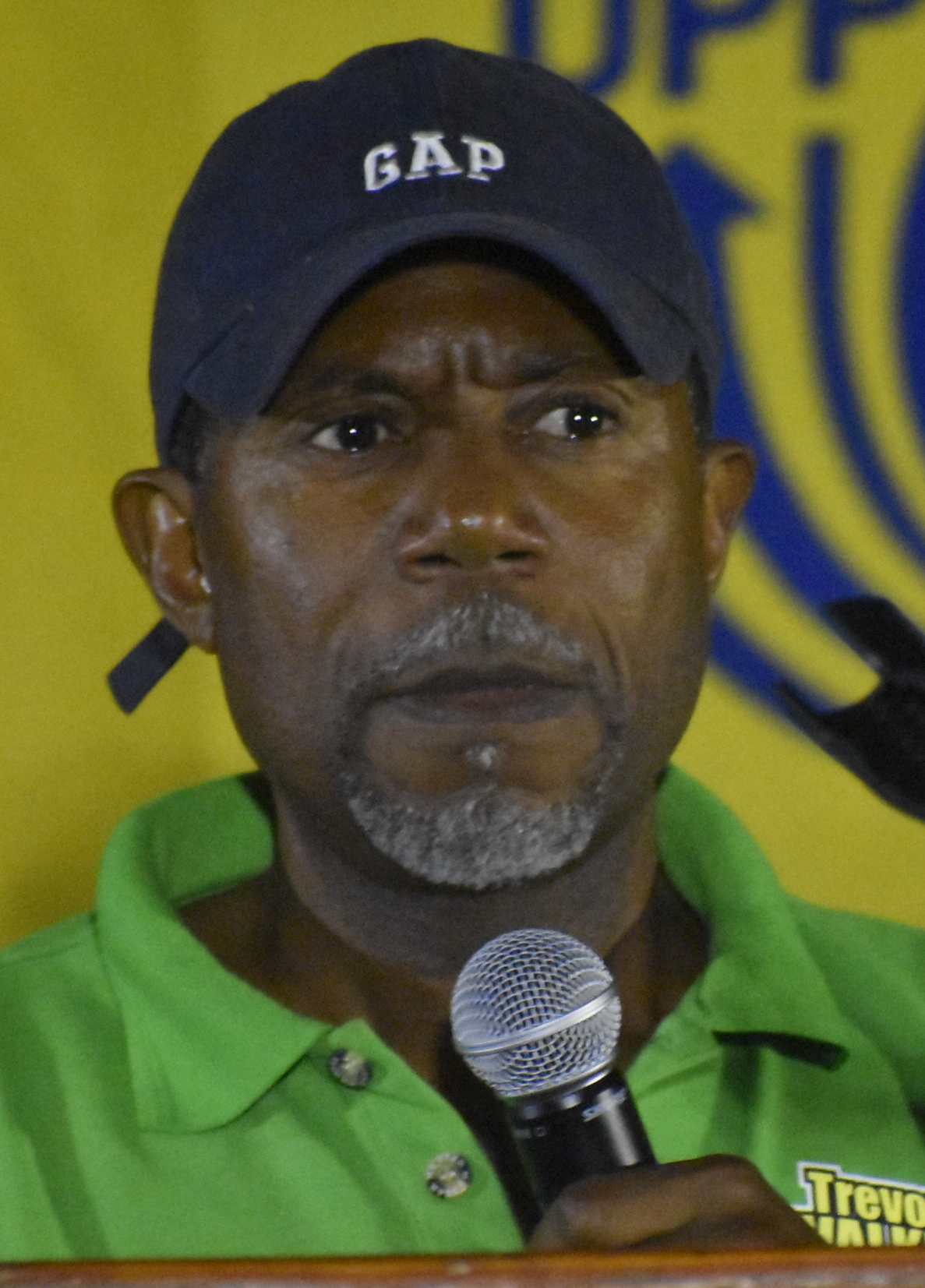
	First party	Second party	Third party
Leader	Gaston Browne	Harold Lovell	Trevor Walker
Party	ABLP	UPP	BPM
Last election	59.24%, 15 seats	37.09%, 1 seat	1.43%, 1 seat
Seats won	9	6	1
Seat change	▼6	▲5	Steady
Popular vote	20,052	19,267	624
Percentage	47.06%	45.22%	1.46%
Swing	▼12.18pp	▲8.13pp	▲0.03pp
- Results by constituency
Prime Minister before election
Gaston Browne
ABLP
Subsequent Prime Minister
Gaston Browne
ABLP

General elections were held in Antigua and Barbuda on 18 January 2023 to elect members of the House of Representatives. The Labour Party (ABLP) has held an absolute majority of 15 seats in the House of Representatives after the 2018 general election, with Gaston Browne remaining as prime minister. Browne initiated a constitutional referendum after the 2018 election, which was rejected by voters, and following the death of Elizabeth II in 2022, he announced his intention to organise a referendum for the transition of Antigua and Barbuda to a republican system. Besides ABLP, the United Progressive Party (UPP), Democratic National Alliance, Barbuda People's Movement (BPM), and three independent politicians filed candidacies for the 2023 general election.

During the election campaign, UPP proposed to raise the minimum wage and expressed support for small businesses, while ABLP pledged to construct more homes and open two polyclinics. ABLP retained its majority in the House of Representatives, although it won a reduced 9 seats, while UPP won 6 seats. Trevor Walker, the leader of the BPM, retained his seat in Barbuda, while Asot Michael, an independent politician and former member of ABLP, won his seat in the St. Peter constituency. Browne was sworn in for his third consecutive term as prime minister a day after the election.

== Background ==
The previous general election was held 15 months early before the scheduled date due to the outgoing prime minister, Gaston Browne, wanting to obtain enough support for the implementation of several projects, such as land reform, in 2019. Browne retained his office, while his Labour Party (ABLP) increased its absolute majority in the House of Representatives. The United Progressive Party (UPP) suffered defeat, with its leader, Harold Lovell, losing his seat.

During the parliamentary term Browne attempted to modify the constitution to make the Caribbean Court of Justice the final court of appeal in the country in place of the Judicial Committee of the Privy Council. This was however rejected in a referendum in November 2018. Following the death of Elizabeth II in September 2022, Browne announced his intention to organise a referendum within three years regarding the transition to a republican system.

== Electoral system ==
The 17 elected members of the House of Representatives were elected in single-member constituencies by first-past-the-post voting; 16 of the seats were allocated for the island of Antigua and one for the island of Barbuda. In December 2022, Browne announced that the election would be held on 18 January 2023.

=== Political parties ===
The table below lists political parties represented in the House of Representatives after the 2018 general election.

Name	Ideology	Political position	Leader	2018 result	
Name	Ideology	Political position	Leader	Votes (%)	Seats
Antigua and Barbuda Labour Party	Paternalistic conservatism	Centre-right	Gaston Browne	59.24%	15 / 17
United Progressive Party	Social democracy	Centre-left	Harold Lovell	37.09%	1 / 17
Barbuda People's Movement	Social democracy Barbudan nationalism	Centre-left to left-wing	Trevor Walker	1.43%	1 / 17

=== Pre-election composition ===
Party	Seats
Antigua and Barbuda Labour Party	15
United Progressive Party	1
Barbuda People's Movement	1

== Campaign ==
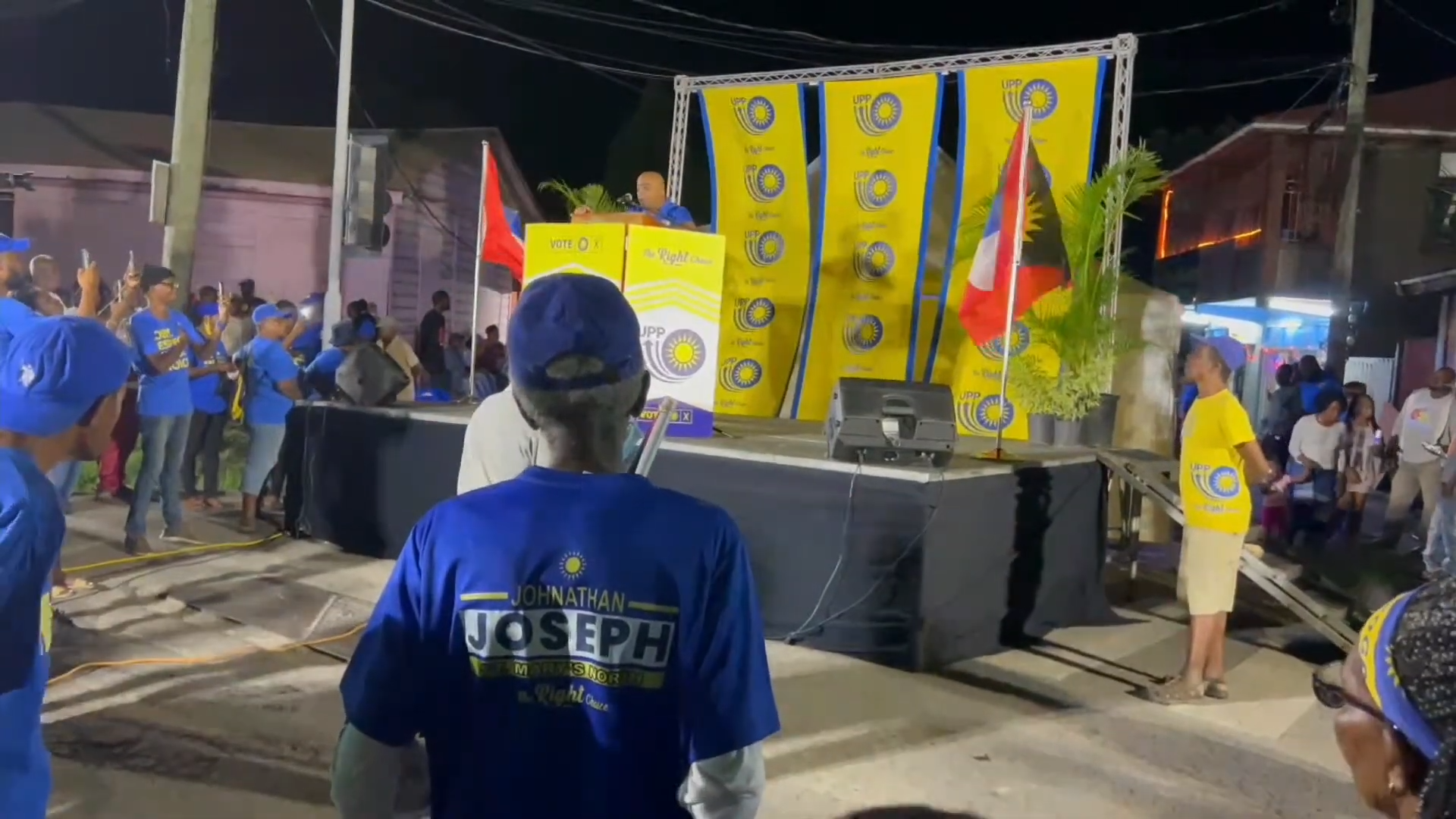
United Progressive Party campaign rally at St. John's

UPP presented its election manifesto on 9 January 2023. Lovell proposed a EC$10 per hour minimum wage and a 10% wage and salary increase for public servants, as well as support for a stable water supply and small businesses. ABLP announced its manifesto on 10 January, proposing to construct more than 1,000 new homes, rebuild the sea landing in Barbuda and open two polyclinics. Both parties also expressed support "for a greener Barbuda". Lovell also declined to debate with Browne. The ABLP branch office for the St. John's City East constituency was set on fire on 16 January.

Carty Anderson, an independent politician formerly associated with UPP, filed his candidacy due to "continued neglect" of the citizens of the St. John's Rural West constituency. Another independent, Gail Pero-Weston, campaigned on "creating a better political landscape rather than representing a single constituency".

== Candidates ==
On 25 March 2022, the ABLP announced their official candidates. New candidates from the Labour Party include Rawdon Turner replacing Asot Michael, Barbuda senator Knacyntar Nedd replacing Arthur Nibbs and senator Gail Christian replacing deputy speaker of the House Londell Benjamin. The UPP nominated candidates in all constituencies except Barbuda.

The Democratic National Alliance (DNA) announced its candidates in April 2022. DNA later announced that Avoy Knight and Tecla Thomas traded their constituencies, and that Stephen Richardson would be their candidate for the St. John's Rural West constituency. Additionally, Moraine Knight was nominated for the St. John's City West constituency and Mario Thomas was nominated for the St. Phillip North constituency. The Barbuda People's Movement (BPM), led by its representative Trevor Walker, announced that it would run in the Barbuda constituency. Independent politicians Carty Anderson, Gail Pero-Weston, and Michael Asot filed to run in St. John's Rural West, St. John's Rural South, and St. Peter constituencies respectively.

#	Constituency	ABLP	UPP	DNA	BPM	Independents
1	St. John's City West	Gaston Browne	Alister Thomas	Moraine Knight	–	–
2	St. John's City East	Melford Nicholas	Harold Lovell	Leon Smith	–	–
3	St. John's City South	Steadroy Benjamin	Franz Chalver deFreitas	Roland Timothy	–	–
4	St. John's Rural West	Gail Christian	Lewis Richard	Stephen Richardson	–	Carty Anderson
5	St. John's Rural South	Daryll Mathew	Gladys Potter	Tecla Thomas	–	Gail Pero-Weston
6	St. John's Rural East	Maria Browne	Sean Bird	Trevor Young	–	–
7	St. John's Rural North	Charles Fernandez	Pearl Quinn-Williams	Louis Rivera	–	–
8	St. Mary's North	Molwyn Joseph	Jonathan Joseph	Kisean Joseph	–	–
9	St. Mary's South	Samantha Marshall	Kelvin Simon	Andrew Antonio	–	–
10	All Saints East and St. Luke	Colin James	Jamale Pringle	Avoy Knight	–	–
11	All Saints West	Michael Browne	Anthony Smith Jr.	Anthony Stuart	–	–
12	St. George	Dean Jonas	Algernon Watts	Kelton Dalso	–	–
13	St. Peter	Rawdon Turner	Tevaughn Harriette	Chaneil Imhoff	–	Asot Michael
14	St. Phillip North	Robin Yearwood	Alex Brown	Mario Thomas	–	–
15	St. Phillip South	Lennox Weston	Sherfield Bowen	Joanne Massiah	–	–
16	St. Paul	Chet Greene	Cleon Athill	Gameal Joyce	–	–
17	Barbuda	Knacyntar Nedd	–	–	Trevor Walker	–

== Results ==
Voting stations were opened from 06:00 to 18:00, and there were 60,916 citizens in total that had the right to vote in the general election. On 5 January 2023, it was announced that the Commonwealth Observer Group, headed by the former president of Seychelles, Danny Faure, would observe the election. CARICOM, as well as the Organization of American States, also announced that it would observe over the election. The Caribbean Development Research Services reported lower turnout in comparison with the previous general election.

The Electoral Commission reported that ABLP won 9 seats in the election, while the UPP won 6 seats in total. In Barbuda, BPM retained its seat while DNA did not win any, although Asot Michael, an independent politician, won his seat in the St. Peter constituency. Lovell of UPP also failed to win his seat.

Party	Votes	%	Seats	+/–
Antigua and Barbuda Labour Party	20,052	47.06	9	–6
United Progressive Party	19,267	45.22	6	+5
Barbuda People's Movement	624	1.46	1	0
Democratic National Alliance	466	1.09	0	0
Independents	2,202	5.17	1	+1
Total	42,611	100.00	17	17
Valid votes	42,611	99.44		
Invalid/blank votes	238	0.56		
Total votes	42,849	100.00		
Registered voters/turnout	60,916	70.34		
Source: Electoral Commission

=== By constituency ===
Constituency	ABLP		UPP		DNA		BPM		Ind		Total
Constituency	Votes	%	Votes	%	Votes	%	Votes	%	Votes	%	Total
All Saints East and St. Luke	1,047	36.00	1,799	61.86	52	1.7					2,908
All Saints West	1,461	41.20	2,022	57.02	44	1.2					3,546
Barbuda	456	42.22					624	57.77			1,080
St. George	2,005	47.46	2,146	50.80	54	1.27					4,224
St. John's City East	791	49.59	785	49.21	13	0.81					1,595
St. John's City South	889	63.18	495	35.18	11	0.78					1,407
St. John's City West	1,295	66.47	621	31.87	18	0.92					1,948
St. John's Rural East	1,770	53.73	1,460	44.32	48	1.45					3,294
St. John's Rural North	1,563	52.46	1,358	45.58	42	1.40					2,979
St. John's Rural South	1,424	56.04	1,074	42.26	11	0.43			19	0.74	2,541
St. John's Rural West	1,614	44.40	1,932	53.14	31	0.85			46	1.26	3,635
St. Mary's North	1,664	49.98	1,615	48.51	28	0.84					3,329
St. Mary's South	862	44.43	1,061	54.69	12	0.61					1,940
St. Paul	1,244	52.11	1,101	46.12	29	1.21					2,387
St. Peter	899	24.42	601	16.33	29	0.78			2,137	58.07	3,680
St. Phillip North	708	52.60	615	45.69	16	1.18					1,346
St. Phillip South	360	37.34	582	60.37	28	2.90					964
Total	20,052	47.13	19,207	45.15	460	1.08	624	1.47	2,202	5.18	42,849
Source: Electoral Commission

== Aftermath ==
Local news outlets reported that ABLP won 9 seats and that it retained its majority in the House of Representatives. Browne addressed his supporters shortly after the election and was congratulated by Bruno Rodríguez Parrilla, the minister of foreign affairs of Cuba. Joanne Massiah, the leader of the DNA, conceded the election, while Lovell resigned as the leader of UPP. Browne was inaugurated into his third consecutive term in office on 19 January 2023.

== See also ==
- Politics of Antigua and Barbuda
- Republicanism in Antigua and Barbuda
