= List of parliamentary constituencies of Antigua and Barbuda =

The House of Representatives is the lower house of the bicameral legislature of Antigua and Barbuda, an island country in the Caribbean. It is housed at the Antigua and Barbuda Parliament Building in St. John's, the national capital. The current legislature was elected by the general election held on 18 January 2023. The parliament has 17 single-member constituencies and it uses the first-past-the-post system for elections. The Members of Parliament (MPs) serve five-year terms.

== List ==
Constituency
St. John's City West
St. John's City South
St. John's Rural East
St. Philip's North
St. Mary's North
St. John's Rural South
St. Paul
St. John's Rural North
St. John's City East
All Saints East & St. Luke
St. Philip's South
St. John's Rural West
St. Mary's South
St. George
Barbuda
St. Peter
All Saints West
