= 2025 St. Peter by-election =

Election in Antigua

- 14 January 2025
Candidate	Rawdon Turner	George Wehner
Party	ABLP	UPP
Popular vote	1,672	570
Percentage	74.58%	25.42%
MP before election
Asot Michael
Independent
Elected MP
Rawdon Turner
ABLP

On 14 January 2025, a by-election was held in the Antiguan parliamentary seat of St. Peter following the murder of Asot Michael. It was Antigua and Barbuda's third election since Prime Minister Gaston Browne emerged victorious in the 2023 general election. It was also the second by-election held outside of Barbuda since independence in 1981. At 23:24 AST, the election was called by ABS for Turner.

== Background ==
Asot Michael had been the member of parliament for St. Peter since the 2004 general election. In the 2023 general election, Michael ran as an independent due to his expulsion from the party in 2021. Rawdon Turner was chosen by the Labour Party to run against him, although Michael won the seat with a comfortable 58.07% of the vote. On 4 November 2024, Michael was murdered, and his short term was defined by an extremely tense relationship with the government, resulting in the government-backed speaker expelling him from the House of Representatives for three sittings.

On 20 December, the date of the election was announced, with the UPP, ABLP, and MLVOP all fielding candidates. The MLVOP candidate, Nigel Bascus, has attempted to run in all by-elections since the 2023 general election, never being able to meet the nomination requirements. The MVLOP did not secure enough support to appear on the ballot.

== Candidates ==
Candidate name	Political party	Home village
George Wehner	UPP	Carty's Hill, Saint Philip
Rawdon Turner	ABLP	Parham

== Polling divisions ==
Polling division	Primary villages
"A"	Parham
"B"	Pares
"C"	Lightfoot

== Results ==
Candidate	Party	Votes	%
Rawdon Turner	Antigua and Barbuda Labour Party	1,672	74.58
George Wehner	United Progressive Party	570	25.42
Total		2,242	100.00
Valid votes		2,242	98.64
Invalid/blank votes		31	1.36
Total votes		2,273	100.00
Registered voters/turnout			–
Source: http://www.abec.gov.ag/speter/
