= Richard Lewis (Antiguan politician) =

Antiguan United Progressive Party politician

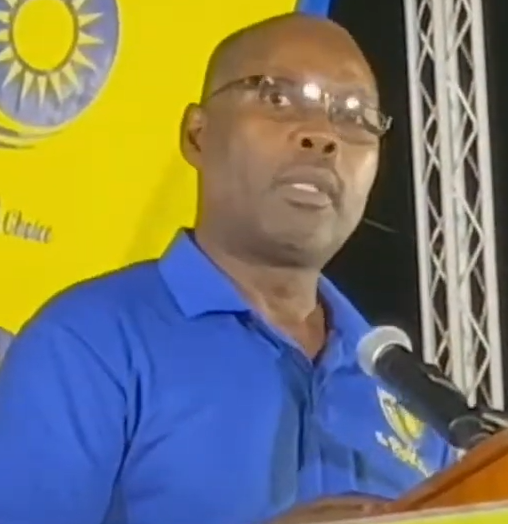

Member of the House of Representatives of Antigua and Barbuda
- In office 18 January 2023 – 1 April 2026
- Preceded by: Londell Benjamin
- Constituency: St. John's Rural West
- Majority: 53.15% (2023)

Personal details
- Born: January 2, 1967 (age 59) Gray's Farm, St. John's
- Party: United Progressive Party

Richard S. Lewis (born 2 January 1967) is an Antiguan United Progressive Party politician, who was elected as Member of Parliament for St. John's Rural West in the general election held on 18 January 2023. Lewis contested the 2024 party leadership elections, which he lost to Jamale Pringle.
