= Eleston Adams =

Antiguan politician

Eleston Adams MP

Member of the House of Representatives of Antigua and Barbuda
- In office 23 March 2004 – 26 April 2014
- Preceded by: Rodney Williams
- Succeeded by: Paul Chet Greene
- Constituency: St. Paul

Personal details
- Political party: United Progressive Party
- Children: 7
- Education: Antigua State College; Edna Manley College of the Visual and Performing Arts

Eleston Montgomery Adams is an Antiguan politician and playwright who served in the House of Representatives of Antigua and Barbuda representing St. Paul from 2004 to 2014, as a member of the United Progressive Party.

== Early life and education ==
Eleston Montgomery Adams was born in Liberta, Antigua and Barbuda, and was educated there. His father was a barber and his mother was a maid. He graduated with a teaching degree from Antigua State College and taught for twenty years in Liberta, John Hughes, Sea View Farm, and Cobbs Cross. He attended the Edna Manley College of the Visual and Performing Arts and wrote 14 plays. He was a reporter for The Daily Observer.

== Career ==
In the 1994 and 1999 general elections Adams ran as the nominee of the United Progressive Party (UPP) in the St. Paul constituency, but lost to Antigua and Barbuda Labour Party (ABLP) nominee Rodney Williams. In the 2004 general election Adams defeated Williams in the St. Paul constituency. He defeated Paul Chet Greene, the nominee of the ABLP, in the 2009 general election. Greene defeated him in the 2014 general election. Adams ran to be leader of the UPP in 2015, but was defeated by Harold Lovell.

Adams Minister of State in the Ministry of Housing, Culture and Social Transformation with responsibility for Culture from 5 January 2005 to 31 December 2006, and the Minister of State in the Ministry of Tourism, Civil Aviation and Culture from 16 March 2009 to 12 June 2014. In 2013, Adams sent an 89 member delegation to represent the country at the Caribbean Festival of Arts, which was criticised due to its large size. Adams was a cricket and football player in his youth and managed the Antigua and Barbuda national football team.

== Personal life ==
Adams is the father of seven children.

== Works cited ==
=== News ===
- Ali, Azad (27 June 2014). "Antigua's gov't considers new governor general appointment". Caribbean Life. Archived from the original on 15 March 2024.
- Carr, Marlon (6 May 2015). "Massiah drops her bid to become leader of the UPP". Antigua Broadcasting Service. Archived from the original on 17 June 2025.
- Derrick, Maverick (24 April 2017). "Political pundits: DNA spells trouble for the UPP". Antigua Observer. Archived from the original on 17 June 2025.

=== Web ===
- "Antigua and Barbuda: 1994 Parliamentary Elections". Georgetown University. 7 April 2005. Archived from the original on 29 September 2024.
- "Culture minister defends size of Carifesta delegation". Caribbean Community. 18 July 2013. Archived from the original on 17 June 2025.
- "Daven Joseph v Chandler Codrington et al & Paul Greene v Eleston et al". Eastern Caribbean Supreme Court. 2009. Archived from the original on 17 June 2025.
- "Eleston Montgomery Adams". Caribbean Elections. Archived from the original on 13 September 2018.
