= Molwyn Joseph =

Antiguan politician

Sir Molwyn Joseph
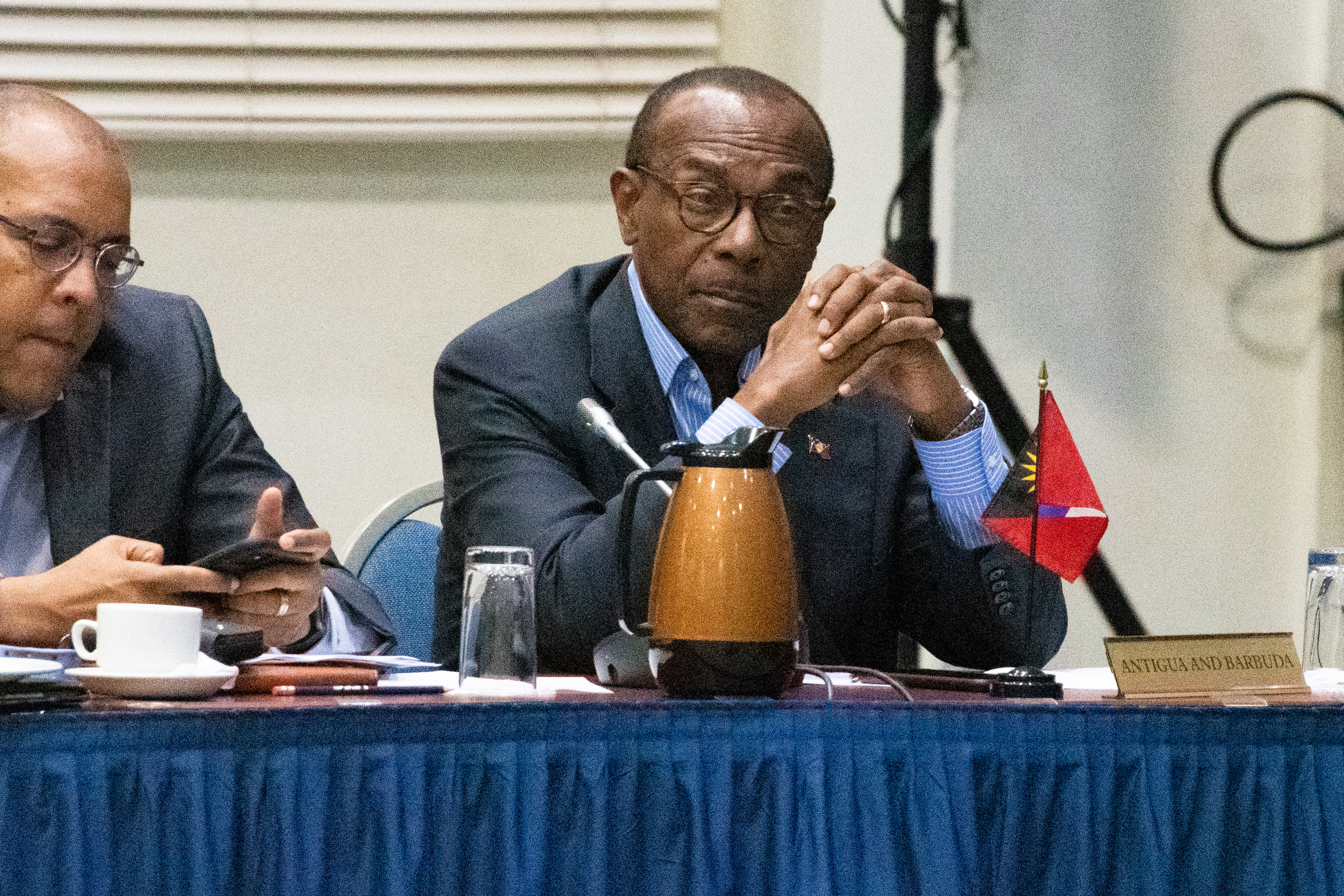

Member of the Antigua and Barbuda Parliament for St. Mary's North
- In office 12 March 2009 – 1 April 2026
- Monarch: Elizabeth II
- Governors General: Louise Lake-Tack, Rodney Williams
- Succeeded by: Philmore Benjamin

Minister of Health, Wellness, Environment and Civil Service Affairs
- In office 18 June 2014 – 1 April 2026

Finance Minister of Antigua and Barbuda
- In office 1991–1994
- Prime Minister: Vere Bird
- Preceded by: Lester Bird
- Succeeded by: John Eugene St. Luce

Finance Minister of Antigua and Barbuda
- In office 1994–1996
- Prime Minister: Lester Bird
- Preceded by: John Eugene St. Luce
- Succeeded by: John Eugene St. Luce

Personal details
- Born: Molwyn Morgorson Joseph Jennings, Saint Mary
- Party: Antigua Labour Party
- Profession: politician

Sir Molwyn Joseph, KGCN, is an Antiguan politician and Chairman of the Antigua Labour Party (ALP). First entering politics in 1984 when he was made a Minister without Portfolio in the government of Vere Bird, Joseph became Minister of Finance seven years later, renegotiating the Antiguan national debt and introducing fiscal reforms. After a 1996 scandal in which it was discovered he had used his position to import a 1930s Rolls-Royce for a friend, bypassing normal import duties and taxes, he was dismissed from the Bird administration, returning 14 months later to serve as Minister for Planning, Implementation and the Environment. Following the 1999 general election, he became Minister of Heath and Social Improvement before being made Minister of Tourism and the Environment a few months later. As Minister, Joseph attempted to improve the perception of Antigua as a tourist destination and invest in the industry, spending 2 million US dollars increasing the number of hotel rooms on the island and providing money for both Air Jamaica and Air Luxor to provide flights to the island.

Outside of his ministerial duties, he also met with Jiang Zhenghua, Vice-Chairman of the Standing Committee of the National People's Congress, having led the official Antiguan delegation to Beijing. Following a power struggle in 2003, Joseph was given the Economic Development and Investment Promotion portfolio, to hold at the same time as his Tourism and the Environment position. Despite a scandal surrounding donations he had received from Texan businessman Robert Allen Stanford, Joseph was selected to contest the seat of St Mary's North in the 2004 Antiguan general election, in which the ALP lost power, being replaced in government by the United Progressive Party (UPP) led by Baldwin Spencer. Joseph himself lost his seat, but was elected Chairman of the ALP a year later, and regained the seat in 2009 with a majority of 21. The same year, he was arrested for participating in an unauthorised May Day rally protesting the UPP administration; after a lengthy trial, he and several other ALP members were convicted and fined.

== Early career ==
Joseph entered Cabinet-level politics on 19 April 1984 when, following the ALP's general election victory, he was made a Minister without Portfolio. In 1991 he became Minister of Finance and Trade, and along with Financial Secretary Keith Hurst and Minister of Economic Development Rodney Williams negotiated the rescheduling of Antigua's national debt with European creditors. The government's 1992 budget, announced and drafted by Joseph, included no new taxes but did involve a cut to government spending, in response to what he claimed was reduced spending by tourists and smaller amounts of international aid in 1990 and 1991. The 1993 budget contained similar provisions, ruling out the possibility of an income tax, as suggested by one of Antigua's major trade unions. This was accompanied by a programme of fiscal reforms, including "expenditure control, improved revenue collection, external debt management, proper evaluation of projects, improved public sector efficiency, price controls on basic foods and commodities, tax reform and good governance".

Within Parliament, Joseph campaigned for the Business Licensing Bill, a statute which aimed to impose licensing fees, ranging from 40 to 20,000 East Caribbean dollars, on those seeking to start businesses in certain fields. The Bill attracted large amounts of controversy, with critics such as Hugh Marshall asserting that it violated the CARICOM Single Market and Economy agreement and the General Agreement on Tariffs and Trade, and would lead to Antiguan traders finding it difficult to expand into external markets. Although other ministers such as Williams spoke in support of the bill, it was later shelved indefinitely, with Joseph saying that he "[found] myself a lonely man".

== Resignation ==
In 1996, Joseph left his position as Minister of Finance after it was discovered that he had helped a friend import a 1930s Rolls-Royce, using his position to bypass the normal import duties and taxes. Although the government's immediate reaction was to deny that this had happened, the Solicitor-General issued a report in which he found that "the landing of the Rolls-Royce car...was in violation of customs and port procedures", facilitated by Joseph's intervention. With the growing pressure, Joseph resigned on 22 September. Now on the backbenches, Joseph became "senior parliamentarian in charge of refugees", and as such was the government's chief spokesperson when the eruption of a volcano in Montserrat led to 3,000 refugees fleeing the country and coming to Antigua and Barbuda.

== Reappointment ==
Joseph's position on the backbenches did not last long; on 3 December 1997, less than two years after his resignation, he was recalled to take up the Planning, Implementation and the Environment portfolio, with Bird saying that "his managerial skills are required at this juncture of our economic history when several projects require implementation to get off the ground quickly". Following the 1999 general election, he was again appointed to the cabinet, this time as Minister of Heath and Social Improvement, with the Planning portfolio going to Steadroy Benjamin. A few months later he became Minister of Tourism and the Environment, with Bernard Percival taking over his Health portfolio.

As Minister, Joseph oversaw a "back-to-basics approach" to tourism, attempting to have the nation perceived as one known "for its cleanliness, tidiness, natural beauty and pristine environment". As part of this, the Antiguan government invested 2 million US dollars in boosting the number of hotel rooms available, from 3,000 to 5,000, and opened the Antigua Hotel Institute, seeking to train Antiguans in how to more efficiently and effectively work in the tourism industry. Joseph also oversaw the government buying a third of the Jolly Beach Resort in an attempt to save it from bankruptcy, establishing a management company to oversee the property. In February 2000 he led the government delegation in an official visit to Beijing, where they met with Jiang Zhenghua, Vice-Chairman of the Standing Committee of the National People's Congress, to discuss "bilateral relations and the issues of common concern". He also led the Antiguan delegation to the World Travel Market in 2001. Following Joseph's promise of government investiture in the route, Air Jamaica resumed flights to Antigua in 2002, having ceased flying there six years earlier. This was followed by the announcement that Air Luxor would similarly begin offering flights to the islands.

After a financial scandal in early 2003, the ALP backbencher Sherfield Bowen asked for a vote of no confidence in Bird's government on 19 May, calling for him to step down and "accusing him of being involved corrupt practices and governing without accountability". When Bowen was threatened with being thrown out of the Party, he claimed that several other MPs and government ministers were prepared to resign if he was dismissed, including Joseph. The dispute remained unresolved, with Bowen accusing the government of vesting too much power in Senator Asot Michael; Bowen, Hilroy Humpheys, Bernard Percival and Longford Jeremy eventually all resigned from the ALP administration, with further suggestions that Joseph, as well as trade minister Gaston Browne, could also leave. Joseph eventually announced on 19 June, that he would resign if Michael was not immediately removed; within a few hours, Michael's resignation had been formally tendered. Soon afterwards, Joseph was given the Economic Development and Investment Promotion portfolio, to hold at the same time as his Tourism and the Environment position.

== Later career ==
In late 2003, it was discovered that Texan businessman Allen Stanford had given both Joseph and fellow minister Gaston Browne cheques worth 100,000 East Caribbean dollars. While Browne denied suggestions that this had constituted bribery, claiming that the money had gone towards community projects, Leader of the Opposition Baldwin Spencer demanded that both ministers resign. Both ministers were part of a team negotiating with Stanford over a land exchange in St. John's, and the news led to protesters picketing their offices. Prime Minister Lester Bird affirmed his support in both ministers, and despite a motion of censure brought by the opposition and more protests, Stanford publicly made a second set of donations to Joseph and Browne.

Antigua had a general election in 2004, following the dissolution of Parliament in late February; with the ALP running a full slate, Joseph was nominated for the St Mary's North seat. The ALP were conclusively defeated by the United Progressive Party (UPP) and forced out of government, Joseph lost his seat to Bertrand Joseph. Now in opposition, the ALP held a leadership contest in 2005, in which Joseph was elected Party Chairman, defeating Vere Bird, Jr. 164 votes to 108. In 2007, he was appointed by Bird to act as Shadow Minister for Tourism and Education. In the 2009 general election he again ran for St Mary's North, defeating Bertrand Joseph by 21 votes; despite this, the UPP retained power. Following an unauthorised ALP march on May Day in 2009 to protest against the UPP government, Joseph and six other senior ALP figures, including the former Prime Minister, were arrested and charged with public order offences. They pleaded not guilty, but were convicted and fined.

In 2020 Molwyn was made a Knight Grand Cross (KGCN) of Order of the Nation.

He was elected again to the House of Representatives in the 2023 general elections for the St Mary's North Constituency and confirmed as Minister of Ministry of Health, Wellness, Environment & Civil Service Affairs in the Government of the Prime Minister Gaston Browne.

== See also ==
- Gaston Browne
- E.P. Chet Greene
- Daryll Matthew
