= Bertrand Joseph =

Antiguan politician

Bertrand Joseph MP

Member of the House of Representatives of Antigua and Barbuda
- In office 23 March 2004 – 9 February 2009
- Preceded by: Molwyn Joseph
- Succeeded by: Molwyn Joseph
- Constituency: St. Mary's North

Personal details
- Party: United Progressive Party

Bertrand Lemuel Joseph is an Antiguan United Progressive Party politician, who was elected as Member of Parliament for St. Mary's North in the 2004 general election.
