= Rawdon Turner =

Antiguan politician

The Honourable Rawdon Turner MP

Member of the House of Representatives of Antigua and Barbuda
- Incumbent
- Assumed office 15 January 2025
- Preceded by: Asot Michael
- Constituency: St. Peter

Minister of Social and Urban Transformation
- Incumbent
- Assumed office 15 January 2025

Personal details
- Party: Antigua and Barbuda Labour Party

Rawdon Nirobi Antonio Turner is an Antigua and Barbuda Labour Party politician, who was elected as Member of Parliament for St. Peter in the by-election held on 14 January 2025 and appointed Minister of Social and Urban Transformation in the government of the Prime Minister Gaston Browne.

== Early life and education ==
Turner born on March 30, 1981, in Antigua and brought up in Parham Town. He completed his schooling at Antigua State College, where he majored in engineering, after attending Pares Secondary School. Afterwards he achieved a degree in Architectural studies at the University of Technology in Jamaica.

== Professional career ==
His love of learning brought him to the teaching profession, where he flourished for seven years before starting his own business. He established Rawdon and Associates, a company that specialises in mining, hardware supply, building, and architectural design, which has given locals steady employment prospects.

== Political career ==
Turner joined Antigua and Barbuda Labour Party on 2022 when he was officially nominated as candidate to the House of Representatives for St. Peter constituency. After being defeated by Asot Michael in the 2023 general elections, he was appointed to the Senate of Antigua and Barbuda for the government on 23 January 2023. In his brief career in the Senate he rose up to the position of deputy president, on 19 November 2024.

On 4 November 2024, St. Peter MP Asot Michael was assassinated. On 16 November, Turner was confirmed again as the ABLP's candidate in the constituency. He resigned on 27 December from Senate in view of by-election challenge.

On December 31, 2024, it took place the official nomination of Rawdon Turner by Antigua and Barbuda Labour Party to contest the by-election in St. Peter on January 14, 2025. On December 23, 2024, the United Progressive Party (UPP) named George Wehner as candidate to contend for the same seat He has been officially nominated on December 31.

Turner launched his campaign on the January 4, 2025, traversing the streets of St. Peter accompanied by Prime Minister Gaston Browne, MP for St. Paul, E.P. Chet Greene and Tourism Minister Charles Max Fernandez, unveiling his manifesto and detailing his proposed plans and initiatives for the area.

Turner emerged victorious in St. Peter by-election on January 14, 2025. He won overwhelmingly (getting all 11 boxes with 1,672 votes in the constituency against his opponent George Wehner, who had 570) and called to become Minister in the Gaston Browne cabinet. He officially sworn in as Minister of Social and Urban Transformation on January 15, 2025.

== Community involvement ==
Turner was actively involved in community work before entering politics. He was the President of the Parham Alliance Beautification and Revitalisation Organisation (PABRO), which promoted community cleanups and mobilised locals to enhance their surroundings. His strong participation extended to the Fitches Creek Residents Association, where he helped with different cleanup activities throughout St. Peter. Turner was able to fund and support various big events in his town, such as sports contests and educational achievements, as well as offer scholarships.

== Personal life ==
Turner is in a relationship and is the father of a child.

== See also ==
- Gaston Browne
- Asot Michael
- Ronald Sanders
- Walton Alfonso Webson
- Antigua.news
