= Gail Christian =

Antiguan and Barbudan politician

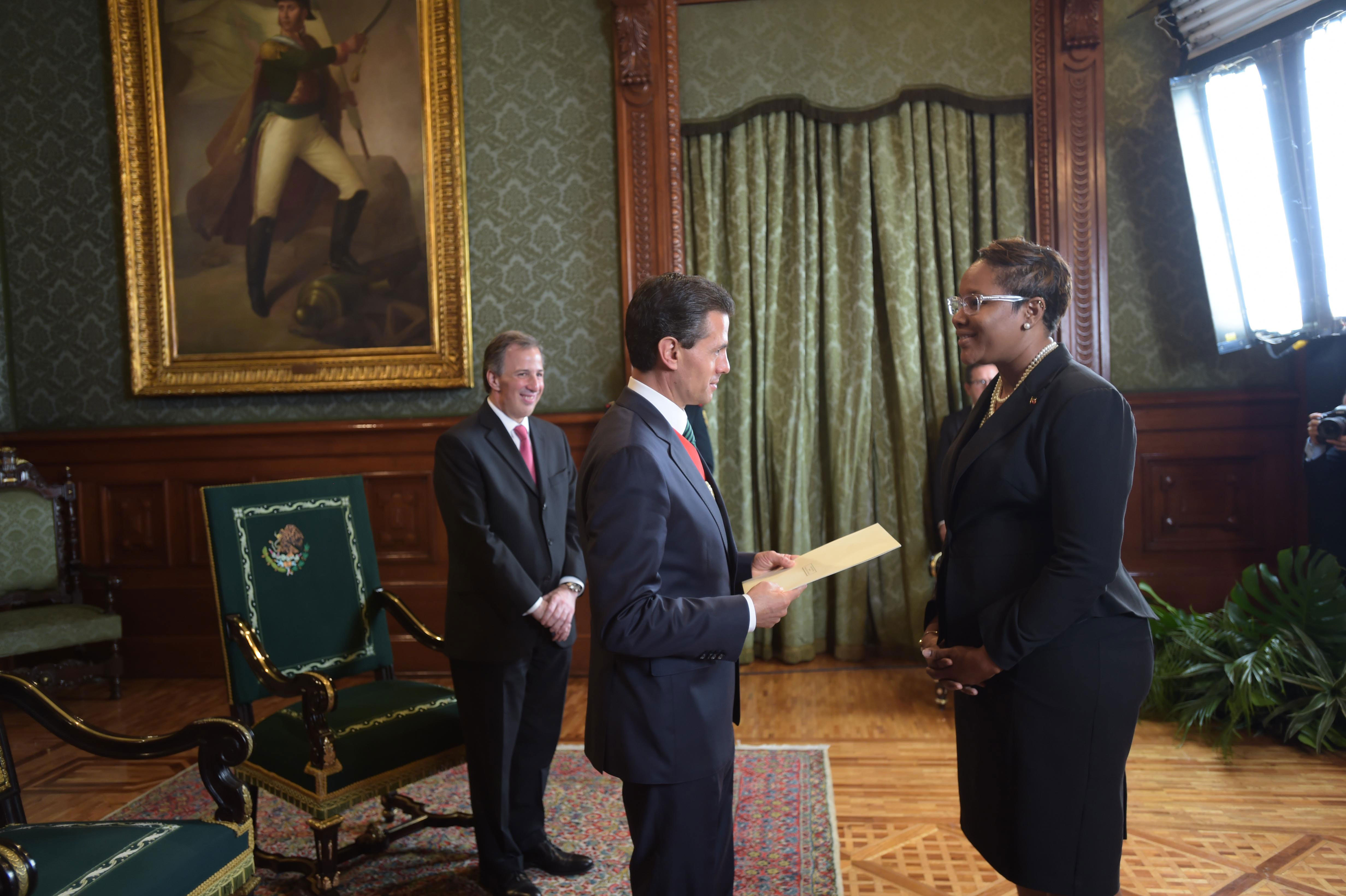

Member of the Senate (Antigua and Barbuda)
- In office 26 March 2018 – 16 December 2022
- In office March 2002 – 9 August 2013

Antiguan and Barbudan Ambassador to Mexico
- In office 2015–2025

Personal details
- Born: St. John's, Antigua and Barbuda
- Party: Antigua and Barbuda Labour Party
- Education: Antigua Girls' High School; Antigua State College; University of Wolverhampton; BPP Law School; University of Oregon School of Law

Gail Christian is an Antiguan and Barbudan politician and former senator. She was a senator of the Upper House of Parliament in Antigua and Barbuda, appointed by Prime Minister Gaston Browne.

== Early life and education ==
Gail Christian attended the Antigua Girls' High School, where she received her secondary school diploma. After her diploma, she attended Antigua State College where she received her certificates in History, Law, Politics and General Studies. After her graduation from Antigua State College, she enrolled into the University of Wolverhampton in the United Kingdom, where she obtained an LLB Degree (Honors) in 1997. Christian later took the English Bar Course at BPP Law School and obtained the Council of Legal Education Certificate from the University of Oregon School of Law.

== Career ==
In 1998, after her education Christian returned to Antigua and Barbuda where she served as an apprentice with Lake and Kentish, an Antigua-based law firm.

In 1999, she joined the Ministry of Justice and Legal Affairs, Antigua as a public prosecutor. She was attached as Prosecutor to the Office of the Director of Public Prosecutions and to the Royal Police Force of Antigua and Barbuda. In 2004, Christian contested the St. John's Rural West seat under the Antigua Labour Party but was unsuccessful.

After an unsuccessful run at the elections, in 2004, she was appointed Senate Minority Leader of the Upper House of Parliament in Antigua and Barbuda (senate) by the then Leader of the Opposition. She served as the senate minority leader while in the senate up until her resignation in 2013. In 2015, Christian was appointed as Antigua and Barbuda's Ambassador to Mexico by prime minister Gaston Browne.

In 2018, Christian was appointed for a second time senator in the Upper House of Parliament in Antigua and Barbuda.

== See also ==
- Senate (Antigua and Barbuda)
