= Antigua and Barbuda Electoral Commission =

Electoral commission in Antigua and Barbuda

Antigua & Barbuda Electoral Commission

Agency overview
- Formed: 2001
- Jurisdiction: Antigua and Barbuda
- Employees: 30
- Agency executives: Arthur Thomas, Chairman; Gary Peters (Antiguan and Barbudan politician), Deputy Chairman; Lorna Simon, Supervisor of Elections
- Website: abec.gov.ag

The Antigua and Barbuda Electoral Commission is the non-partisan entity responsible for administering all elections in Antigua and Barbuda. Constituency boundaries are overseen by a separate body, the Constituencies Boundaries Commission. Unlike the boundaries commission, the electoral commission is not enshrined in the constitution.

== History ==
The Antigua and Barbuda Electoral Commission was established on 3 December 2001, after the Commonwealth Observer Group recommended the creation of an independent electoral commission. The inaugural chairman was McClin Mathias.

== Structure ==
The process of appointing the chairman involves the nomination of a candidate by the prime minister, followed by negotiations with the leader of the opposition. The ultimate goal of this process is to arrive at a mutually agreeable candidate who can assume the role of chairman. The position of deputy chairman is a political appointment made by the leader of the opposition in consultation with the prime minister. The individual selected for this role is typically a prominent figure within the opposition party and is tasked with serving as a liaison between the opposition and the ruling party. The process of selecting a deputy chairman involves negotiation and collaboration between the two major political parties, with the ultimate goal of ensuring effective communication and cooperation within the government. The composition of the Antigua and Barbuda Senate includes five members who are nominated by various entities. The Prime Minister nominates two members, while the Leader of the Opposition nominates one. Additionally, the Antigua Christian Council and the United Evangelical Association of Antigua and Barbuda nominate one member, and the Antigua and Barbuda Chamber of Commerce and Industry as well as the Antigua and Barbuda Employers' Federation nominate the final member.
