= Hilroy Humphreys =

Antiguan politician

Member of the House of Representatives
- In office 24 April 1980 – 26 February 2004
- Preceded by: George Walter
- Succeeded by: Chanlah Codrington

Personal details
- Party: Antigua and Barbuda Labour Party

Hilroy Humphreys was an Antiguan Labour Party politician, who was first elected as Member of Parliament for All Saints in the 1980 general election. He served as MP for All Saints West from 1984.
