= Gray's Farm =

- Neighbourhood
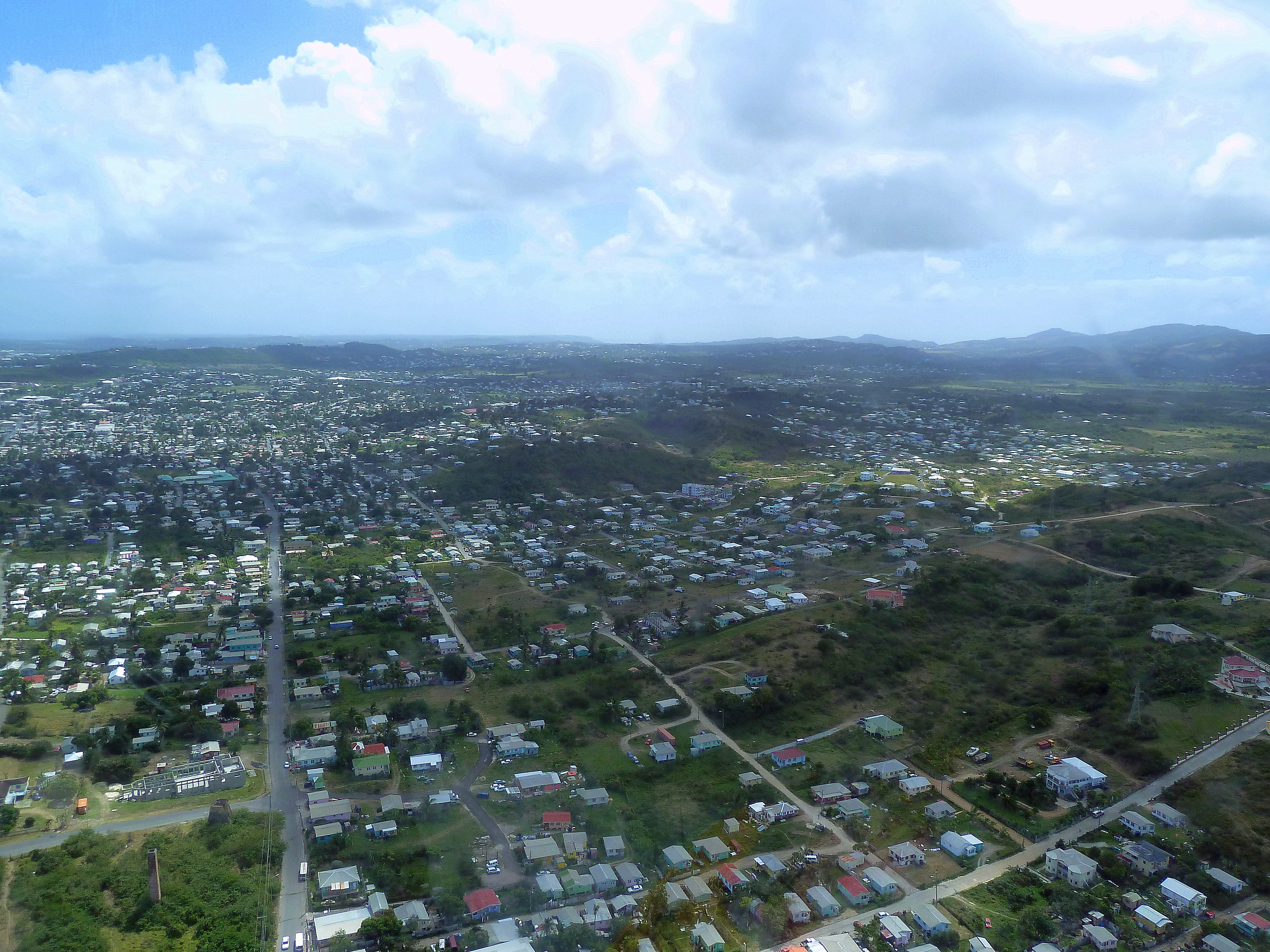
- Gray's Farm Main Road

- Location within Antigua and Barbuda
- Coordinates: 17°06′45″N 61°50′53″W
- Country: Antigua and Barbuda
- Parish: Saint John
- City: St. John's

Government
  - MP: Michael Joseph

Population (2001)
  - Total: 1,352
- Time zone: UTC-4 (AST)

Gray's Farm is a neighbourhood of St. John's, Antigua and Barbuda. In 2001, the major division had a population of 1,352. The fourth most deprived area in Antigua and Barbuda according to a 2007 study, Gray's Farm is known across the country for its poverty and crime. Urban decay is a significant issue, with stray dogs, litter, and overcrowded housing. The community is considered to be lacking job opportunities, proper sanitation, road signs, and proper housing. Many of the area's residents are foreign nationals, and there is a significant number of Spanish speakers. Some residents in the community have blamed these Hispanic and CARICOM migrants for overpopulation and social issues. The lack of recreational facilities in the neighbourhood has been blamed for the high rate of juvenile delinquency in the area. Gray's Farm is also prone to flooding due to poor drainage. The neighbourhood is represented in the House of Representatives by Michael Joseph for the St. John's Rural West constituency. The nearest major highway is Valley Road.
