= Bernard Percival =

Bernard Percival is an Antiguan politician. Minister of Education in the 1980s, he succeeded Molwyn Joseph as Minister of Heath and Social Improvement in 1999. Afterwards, he has been appointed as non-resident Ambassador to the Bolivarian Republic of Venezuela.

On 13 December 2023 after 9 p.m., Percival was confronted at his home by an armed attacker who shot him twice in the leg and groin and grabbed his bag.
