= Asot Michael =

Antiguan politician (1969–2024)

The Honourable Asot Michael

Minister of Tourism, Economic Development Investment and Energy
- In office 12 June 2014 – 23 October 2017
- Governor General: Rodney Williams
- Prime Minister: Gaston Browne
- Constituency: Saint Peter

Member of Parliament
- In office 23 March 2004 – 5 November 2024
- Preceded by: Longford Jeremy
- Succeeded by: Rawdon Turner
- Constituency: Saint Peter

Minister of Investment and Trade
- In office 2 March 2018 – May 2020
- Governor General: Rodney Williams
- Prime Minister: Gaston Browne
- Constituency: Saint Peter

Personal details
- Born: 21 December 1969 Guadeloupe, France
- Died: 5 November 2024 (aged 54) Saint John, Antigua and Barbuda
- Party: Independent
- Other political affiliations: Antigua and Barbuda Labour Party (expelled)

Asot Anthony Emmanuel Michael (21 December 1969 – 5 November 2024) was an Antiguan politician who was a member of the Parliament of Antigua and Barbuda, elected from Saint Peter Constituency. He was also the Minister of Tourism, Economic Development, Investment and Energy under Prime Minister Gaston Browne. He had previously been a member of the Antigua and Barbuda Labour Party.

== Early life and education ==
Asot Michael was born in Guadeloupe, French West Indies, on 21 December 1969, in an Antiguan family. His grandfather Asot A. Michael and his father Patrick Michael were business people supporting the ruling Antigua and Barbuda Labour Party. He attended St. Joseph's Academy in Antigua from 1982 to 1986 for his secondary education. Michael obtained a BS in business administration from Barry University (Miami Shores, Florida) in 1989, and an MBA from the University of Miami in 1991.

After completing his studies, Michael returned to Antigua to work at Asot's Arcade, a family business named for his late grandfather.

== Political career ==
In 1995, Michael began his first job in government as the Special Administrative Assistant to then-Prime Minister Lester Bird, and was eventually appointed Bird's Chief of Staff in 1997. After that, Michael was appointed a Government Senator in 1999 as well as Minister of State in the office of the Prime Minister, overseeing responsibilities for Public Works, Communications, Insurance, Energy and St. John's Development Corporation. He continued in the role until 2001, when he became a full minister responsible for these portfolios until 2003. He was also appointed Junior Minister of Finance in 2001, and served in the position until 2003. From 1999 to 2003, Michael served as Leader of Government Business in the Senate.

Michael was first elected to the House of Representatives for the constituency of Saint Peter in 2004. He belonged to the Antigua Labour Party during his elections of 2004 and 2009, until the party transitioned to the Antigua and Barbuda Labour Party when he was re-elected in 2014 and 2018.

In 2016, the Caribbean Journal awarded Michael the Best Tourism Minister Award for the entire Caribbean.

On 23 October 2017, he was detained at Heathrow Airport while in transit to a citizenship by investment conference in France, being accused of having requested bribes from a British investor in 2016. While being interviewed by U.K. authorities, Prime Minister Gaston Browne removed him as Minister of Tourism, Economic Development, Investment and Energy despite Michael denying any wrongdoing and stating the original detention was for the purpose of an interview with the police.

Michael was re-elected to parliament on March 21, 2018, receiving 78 percent of the votes. He was subsequently appointed Minister of Investment and Trade in the second consecutive government led by Prime Minister Gaston Browne. However, less than two months later, on 15 May 2018, he resigned from his position amid new allegations claiming that he demanded money, a car, and campaign financing from British tycoon Peter Virdee while serving as minister of energy in 2016.

Michael, in a statement to the media said, "I emphasize that I am not a party to the court proceedings in the United Kingdom which have been reported in the media, nor have I been charged with any wrongdoing. The media reports refer to recordings of conversations between persons other than myself, and I cannot be held responsible for their utterances.".

Gaston Browne redistributed the two portfolios previously held by Michael, assigning the Ministry of Trade to E.P. Chet Greene and the Ministry of Investment to Charles “Max” Fernandez.

In May 2019, Browne admitted in a public statement that Asot Michael has been a great asset to the government and the Antigua Barbuda Labour Party (ABLP) and that he had made tremendous contributions to the country. Prime Minister Browne stated also, "Unfortunately, [Michael] has a legal issue he has to dispense [with], and as soon as he is able to do so, we look forward to his return to the government to make his contribution."

However, tensions began to rise between the ABLP executive, Prime Minister Gaston Browne, and Michael.

In October 2021, the party's General Secretary, Mary-Claire Hurst, informed Michael that he was prohibited from attending future meetings. However, on 12 November 2021, Michael secured an interim injunction that temporarily prevented the party from restricting his attendance at executive meetings, taking any action to remove him from the ABLP, or obstructing him from performing his duties as the duly elected representative for St. Peter. In response to Michael's allegations, the government issued a statement from the Office of the Prime Minister asserting that it is Asot Michael's "usual practice, whenever his conduct comes to light, to portray himself as a victim and to make unfounded and malicious accusations against others, aiming to divert attention from his purported misconduct." The High Court, presided over by Justice Drysdale, lifted the injunction on 16 December 2021 but allowing Michael to participate in meetings of the ABLP executive. A request to strike out the entire injunction was rejected on 25 February 2022 by the High Court.

In March, the Antigua and Barbuda Labour Party announced Rawdon Turner as its candidate for the constituency. However, Michael argued that this decision violated the ABLP's constitution. On 7 April, the Eastern Caribbean Supreme Court supported Michael's position by issuing an interim declaration stating that Turner had not been selected in accordance with the ABLP's rules.

Nevertheless, Michael's name was notably missing at the ABLP party's convention on 10 July, during which 17 candidates were officially endorsed to run in the election. Instead, Rawdon Turner was presented as the party's candidate for St. Peter.

In a decision issued on 12 December 2022, the High Court of Antigua and Barbuda has nullified the efforts made by ABLP's Executive to impose disciplinary measures against Michael, which were intended to prevent him from running as a candidate for the ABLP in the St Peter's constituency during the general election.

In the general elections held on January 23, 2023, Asot Michael secured his position by a margin of 2,137 votes. He successfully defeated ABLP candidate Rawdon Turner, who received 899 votes, United Progressive Party candidate Tevaughn Harriette with 541 votes, and Democratic National Alliance candidate Chaneil Imhoff, who garnered 29 votes. Notably, for the first time in Antigua's history, an independent candidate has been sworn in as a Member of Parliament.

The last two years of Michael's life were marked politically by episodes of bickering in parliament (even culminating in his controversial suspension by the House Speaker) to moments of rapprochement with the ABLP and Prime Minister Gaston Browne.

== Death ==
Around 8 am on Tuesday, 5 November 2024 the police responded to a report, where the body of Michael was found unresponsive in a pool of blood at his home at Dry Hill in Saint John, Antigua and Barbuda. He was found with what appeared to be multiple puncture wounds about his body. Michael was pronounced dead at 10:10 am, aged 54, by a medical doctor who arrived at the scene. His death was treated as a possible homicide, with injuries indicating that he had been stabbed. A family insider stated that Michael was brutally attacked, with a piece of the weapon embedded in his body and his teeth knocked out, suggesting he was struck in the face, even though police have not revealed the motive for the crime. Authorities requested regional and international assistance in resolving the circumstances of his death. Police sought public assistance also. On 7 November, Attorney General Steadroy Benjamin announced the authorization of Cabinet to reach out to the UK government for a Scotland Yard team to come to St. John's and assist local law enforcement. FBI reportedly joined the investigations into murder of Michael also. A first suspect in Michael's murder was identified and announced by police on 5 Nov. In the evening of 8 November, the police took into custody and charged 26-year-old Alexta Francis, a Golden Grove resident, for Michael's murder. Francis appeared in court on 11 Nov. and was remanded to prison in a maximum security cell following an unusual early court session (at 6 am). On 21 November 2024 the government has confirmed that a forensic pathologist from Canada, Dr. Alfredo Walker, has been commissioned to undertake the autopsy of Asot Michael in Antigua.

== Official funeral ==
On 7 November, the government, led by Prime Minister Gaston Browne, decided to grant MP Asot Michael an official funeral, which took place on 18 December, at Holy Family Cathedral.

== See also ==
- Gaston Browne
- Ronald Sanders
- Walton Alfonso Webson
