= Londell Benjamin =

Antiguan politician

Londell Benjamin MP

Member of the House of Representatives of Antigua and Barbuda
- In office 21 March 2018 – 16 December 2022
- Preceded by: Baldwin Spencer
- Succeeded by: Richard Lewis
- Constituency: St. John's Rural West

Deputy Speaker of the House of Representatives of Antigua and Barbuda
- In office 26 March 2018 – 16 December 2022
- Preceded by: Dean Jonas
- Succeeded by: Robin Yearwood

Member of the Senate of Antigua and Barbuda
- In office 24 June 2014 – 26 February 2018; Government senator

Personal details
- Party: Antigua and Barbuda Labour Party

Londell Turham McAlister Benjamin is an Antiguan Labour Party politician who was elected as Member of Parliament for St. John's Rural West in the general election held on 21 March 2018.
