= Joseph Myers (politician) =

Antiguan politician

Joseph Myers MP

Member of the House of Representatives of Antigua and Barbuda
- In office 11 February 1971 – 18 February 1994
- Preceded by: Donald Sheppard
- Succeeded by: Longford Jeremy
- Constituency: St. Peter

Personal details
- Party: Antigua and Barbuda Labour Party

Joseph Myers was an Antigua and Barbuda Labour Party politician, who was elected as Member of Parliament for St. Peter in the 1971 general election.
