= Chanlah Codrington =

Antiguan politician

Chanlah Codrington MP

Member of the House of Representatives of Antigua and Barbuda
- In office 23 March 2004 – 26 April 2014
- Preceded by: Hilroy Humphreys
- Succeeded by: Michael Browne
- Constituency: All Saints West

Personal details
- Party: United Progressive Party

Lorencezo Chanlah Codrington is an Antiguan United Progressive Party politician, who was elected as Member of Parliament for All Saints West in the 2004 and 2009 general elections.
