= Democratic National Alliance (Antigua and Barbuda) =

- President: Joanne Massiah
- Founded: April 18, 2017
- Split from: UPP
- Ideology: Progressivism; Social democracy
- Political position: Center-left
- Colors: Orange and Black
- Slogan: Prosperity for All

Election symbol
- Rose

Website
- www.dnaab.com

The Democratic National Alliance (DNA) is a political party in Antigua and Barbuda founded on April 18, 2017. The DNA is currently led by former MP and Senator Joanne Massiah. The party was founded after a disastrous leadership race within the United Progressive Party (which Massiah and her team withdrew from) following their defeat in the 2014 General Elections.

Following UPP's Convention in 2015, Joanne Massiah, the then-elected Member of Parliament for All Saint's East and St. Luke, was expelled from the party on February 12, 2017.

== Party officers ==
- President – Col. Joanne Massiah
- 1st Vice President – Col. Bruce Goodwin
- 2nd Vice President – Col. Anthony Stuart
- Chairperson – Col. Malaka Parker
- Deputy Chairperson – Col. Louis Rivera
- Secretary General – Col. Gatesworth James
- Deputy Secretary General – Col. Majorie Parchment
- Communications Officer – Col. Chaneil Imhoff
- Chief Financial Officer – Col. Gameal Joyce
- Deputy Financial Officer – Col. Coady Joseph
- Mobilization Officer – Col. Kelton Dalso

== Electoral results ==
Election	Party leader	Votes	%	Seats	+/–	Position	Government
2018	Joanne Massiah	754	1.94	0 / 17	New	3rd	Extra-parliamentary
2023	Joanne Massiah	460	1.09	0 / 17	0	▼4th	Extra-parliamentary
