= Longford Jeremy =

Antiguan politician

Member of the House of Representatives
- In office 8 March 1994 – 26 February 2004
- Preceded by: Joseph Myers
- Succeeded by: Asot Michael

Personal details
- Party: Antigua and Barbuda Labour Party

Longford Jeremy is an Antiguan Labour Party politician, who was first elected as Member of Parliament for St. Peter in the 1994 general election.
