= Spring Gardens Teacher Training College =

Spring Gardens Teacher Training College which initially was named The Female Teachers' Training School was one of the earliest normal schools in the Caribbean region. Located in Antigua it was opened as an informal women's training school in 1840, by Bishop George Westerby of the Moravian Church. The private school's goal was to train Caribbean women to teach other Caribbean women. It operated for 118 years, until 1958, and was the longest-lived training institution founded by missionaries in the region.

== History ==
The Female Teachers' Training School opened in Lebanon, Antigua, in 1840 at the home of Moravian Bishop George Westerby as an exclusively female training academy providing an education for five girls who wanted to become teachers. The missionary goal to prepare women to be good wives and mothers for the male teachers expanded to train women to be teachers themselves. Westerby and his wife's success with their initial trainees, led them to seek "black and coloured" girls between the ages of ten and fifteen to be trained to teach others about cleanliness, industry and order. Students were boarded and provided with clothing and lodging, as well as training.

The school was one of the earliest educational organizations in the region and was moved to Spring Gardens, when it was officially organized in 1854. It offered classroom instruction along with industrial education and manual work and was geared to training teachers who would be able to instruct others to learn a trade. The school was a Moravian institution and received very little financial support from the government. The intent of the organization was to train women, who were indigenous to the region, to teach students throughout the Caribbean. The class of 1855 included ten pupils, which increased to sixteen students by 1858. Westerby retired in 1873 and was replaced by Reverend Romig. In 1887, the school had the largest enrollment of any school in the region, though attendance was often half of enrollment, in the Leeward Islands. In the period between 1840 and 1891, 161 students had graduated.

For the first thirty-eight years of the school's existence, the majority of its funding came from the Mission Board in Germany, but in 1892, the Government of the Leeward Islands agreed to pay for the education of eight girls for a cost of £25 annually. The contract effectively meant that the school had to meet government standards with regard to curricula, staffing, and student make-up, expanding the citizenship and religious affiliation of the students. Around the same time, the Government of Barbados extended scholarships as well. Until 1894, the director of the school was always an ordained minister who reported to the German Mission Board. Other staff consisted of a principal and a female full-time tutor, who also served as house matron. Staff was traditionally secured in England until 1892, when for the first time teachers trained locally were secured as instructors.

Because Antigua is located in the center of the Leeward Islands it is easily accessible to all of the islands of the Lesser Antilles and Spring Gardens was well known throughout the region. Students typically came from pupil-teacher programs widely in use in the region. As a general rule, its students had low academic preparation causing the under-funded normal school to teach general knowledge in addition to providing professional training. In 1900, the name was changed to Spring Gardens Teacher Training College in an effort to refocus on professional training. Always a financial struggle to stay afloat, the depression caused by falling sugar prices in 1906, and the government's decision to cut education grants in 1913, caused further hardship. In 1914, the Barbadian government withdrew its grants and students, as well, making plans to build its own facilities. Then during World War I, the Moravian Church lost all of its German investments and discussion turned to whether the school should be closed. In 1918, the Leeward Island Government decided that it was less expensive to utilize the facilities at Spring Gardens than to build their own schools, giving new life to the school. In the years following the war, the school operated as a hybrid institution, partially a secondary education facility and partially a teacher training college.

The Marriot-Mayhew Commission, which investigated the school systems in the Leeward and Windward Islands during 1931, wrote a scathing report on education in the area in general, calling the education provided backward, except in Barbados and Trinidad, and the conditions of facilities deplorable. Arthur Mayhew, the chief adviser on education in the colonies to Britain, and F. C. Marriott, director of Trinidad's education programs, wrote in their report that Spring Gardens had a low standard both academically and professionally. They went on to report that staff was inadequately trained in the techniques of teaching and had no understanding of the relationship between schooling and community needs. But their assessment was similar for all of the schools not located in Barbados or Trinidad. They made no recommendations to improve the conditions at the school and their attempts to redirect students to distant Trinidad were ineffective. Then in the late 1930s through the mid-1940s, the Moyne Commission investigated education conditions in the British West Indies again. Recommendations from that report caused the Leeward Island Government to pressure the Moravians to expand the school and improve conditions, or face government withdrawal of support.

Though the school adopted numerous survival strategies, including accepting paying students, it limped through the next few decades. Lack of will on the part of government authorities to invest in teacher training, or address organizational issues put forth by the Antigua Teachers Association, kept the institution in a state of limbo. The school lowered entrance requirements in an attempt to gain more paying students, but that simply eroded the already declining standards. In the 1950s, the school offered training in handicrafts for the first time. Though for many years the government had given grants and scholarships to the school, they had no part in the administration of the school until 1954. At that time, the school board was revised with only two members representing the Moravian Church and the other four members as representatives of the government. In 1955, Spring Gardens opened its courses to male students for the first time. When Spring Gardens closed in 1958, it had the distinction of having been the longest operating training institution founded by missionaries in the region. The government announced that at the end of the term, it would no longer support the school financially, choosing instead to found a new training college. In 1960, students from Spring Garden were moved to the Leeward Islands Teachers' Training College (LITTC) which opened in Golden Grove, in St. John's Parish. LITTC operated until 1977, when it was absorbed into Antigua State College.
