= Anthony Smith (Antiguan politician) =

Antiguan politician

Anthony Shamari Smith MP

Member of the House of Representatives of Antigua and Barbuda
- Incumbent
- Assumed office 18 January 2023
- Preceded by: Michael Browne
- Constituency: All Saints West

Minister of Agriculture, Lands, Fisheries, and the Blue Economy
- Incumbent
- Assumed office 16 July 2024

Personal details
- Party: Labour (2026–present); Independent (2024–2026); United Progressive Party (before 2024)

Anthony Shamari Smith is an Antiguan independent politician, who was elected as Member of Parliament for All Saints West in the general election held on 18 January 2023 officially nominated by United Progressive Party (UPP). On 15 July 2024, he left the United Progressive Party and became an independent. On 16 July 2024, he was appointed as Minister of Agriculture, Lands, Fisheries, and the Blue Economy by the Prime Minister Gaston Browne. He sworn in before the Governor-General Rodney Williams the same day.

== See also ==
- Gaston Browne
- Ronald Sanders
- Walton Alfonso Webson
- Antigua.news
