= Michael Browne (Antigua and Barbuda politician) =

Politician from Antigua and Barbuda

Michael Browne MP

Member of the House of Representatives of Antigua and Barbuda
- In office 2014–2023
- Preceded by: Chanlah Codrington
- Succeeded by: Anthony Smith
- Constituency: All Saints West

Personal details
- Political party: Labour Party

Michael Sherwin Harris Browne is a politician from Antigua and Barbuda from the Labour Party. Browne was MP for All Saints West.

== Political career ==
In 2020, Browne resigned as Minister of Education, Science and Technology in the Cabinet of Antigua and Barbuda.
