= Michael Joseph (politician) =

Antigua and Barbuda Labour Party politician

Michael M. Joseph

Member of the House of Representatives of Antigua and Barbuda
- Incumbent
- Assumed office 1 May 2026
- Preceded by: Richard Lewis
- Constituency: St. John's Rural West

Member of the Senate of Antigua and Barbuda
- In office 12 November 2024 – 1 April 2026; Government senator
- Preceded by: Samantha Marshall

Personal details
- Party: Antigua and Barbuda Labour Party

Michael M. Joseph (born 24 October 1988) is an Antigua and Barbuda Labour Party politician, who was appointed to the Senate of Antigua and Barbuda for the government on 12 November 2024.

He was elected to the House of Representatives in 2026.
