= Golden Grove, St. John's =

Village in Antigua

Golden Grove
- Neighbourhood
- Location in Antigua and Barbuda
- Coordinates: 17°06′12″N 61°50′49″W
- Country: Antigua and Barbuda
- Island: Antigua
- Civil parish: Saint John Parish

Government
  - Type: Village Council (possibly dissolved)

Population (2011)
  - Total: 567
- Time zone: UTC-4 (AST)

Golden Grove is a neighbourhood in St. John's, Antigua and Barbuda.

The Golden Grove Primary School is located in the town.

== History ==
=== Golden Grove Estate ===
According to William Milder's 1669 will, "To my son Jacob Hill, together with 12 or 13 slaves, is half of my Antigua estate named "Paul's," which I just acquired from the widow Elliner [sic] Paull. The other half of my plantation, as well as my moiety of the sloop "Martha" and half of the ship "Charles" of Nevis, were given to my friend John Travers." In the same year, William Mildon of Bristol and Nevis included his farm known as "Paull Plantation" on the island of Antigua in his will. Thomas Ayson of Bristol, England, left his kinsman 50,000 pounds of muscovado sugar from his plantation in Nevis in the same year. Elliner Paull had just lately acquired it, as was mentioned above.

In a petition from William McKinnon in 1698, it was stated that Thomas Trant, a deceased Roman Catholic, was the owner of the Golden Grove Plantation and that William Bridges, Esq. was holding it in trust for him. "By his letter of attorney dated November 1998 appointed Mr. Garret Trant of Montserrat, Mr. David Rice and Mr. Thomas Trant, Jr., of London to sell or let that estate, and two of them accordingly.

Captain John Gamble "seized of certain plantations... one called Golden Grove, and the other the Road Plantation previously Rakes Bay" in 1716 while under indenture to William and Elizabeth Bridges.

For many years, William McKinnon neglected his plantations. In 1773, he went back to Antigua and joined the Council. He was the owner of the 830-acre estates McKinnon's (#10) and Golden Grove.

From 1801 through 1812, Charles Curtis oversaw the management of this plantation for Samuel Martin. Samuel Martin served as Bertie Entwhistle's trustee after his death in 1803, and as a result, Mr. Curtis was appointed manager of Golden Grove, Barnacle Point (#58), and Jolly Hill (#167). In 1822, Mr. Curtis traveled back to England. He had a box of letters with Samuel Martin that Janet Richards, a distant relative, found. The correspondence included 41 pages of accounting for the Bertie Entwhistle Trust for these estates between 1812 and 1822.

People of color were formerly denied burial space in the churchyard at St. John's Cathedral. The bell, which ordinarily rang to commemorate the passing of plantation owners and their family, "was forbidden to do that service for those degraded ones whose veins flowed the least drop of tarnished blood from Africa." As a result, a smaller bell (which still hangs in the belfry) was purchased from the Golden Grove estate, which was frequently reserved for the use of people of color alone.

When slavery was abolished by the British Parliament in 1833, Golden Grove received a legacy award of £2,363, 5s. 9p. for releasing slaves. Ralph Peters received the only honor.

Flying Horse Hill had a tavern called Flying Horse during World War II. It was situated close to the current Wendy's location. The conflict between Con White SrPub's Allie's and Flying Horse saw a lot of action throughout the conflict. In Allie's Bar, images of Stalin, Churchill, Roosevelt, and Chiang Kai-Shek were prominently displayed. In Golden Grove, where the Antigua State College is currently located, Mr. White also ran a nightclub. In one club, there were "brams," a harsh and inexpensive dance. The land at this location was sold by Flying Horse Hill to the government so that the State College could be built there.

The Antigua Sugar Factory, Ltd. predicted that Golden Grove and Clare Hall (#13b) would yield 2,518 tons of sugar from 2,567 tons of cane delivered at a price of 19.26 cents per ton; 120 acres; and 26 acres with peasants in 1941.

== Demographics ==
Golden Grove has two enumeration districts.

- 13300 Golden Grove School
- 13400 Golden Grove

=== Census data (2011) ===
Ethnic Data for Golden Grove
Q48 Ethnic	Counts	%
African descendent	541	95.35%
East Indian/India	9	1.67%
Mixed (Black/White)	5	0.93%
Mixed (Other)	4	0.74%
Hispanic	4	0.74%
Other	1	0.19%
Don't know/Not stated	2	0.37%
Total	567	100.00%

Religion Data for Golden Grove
Q49 Religion	Counts	%
Adventist	96	16.95%
Anglican	54	9.50%
Baptist	11	1.86%
Church of God	40	7.08%
Evangelical	102	18.06%
Jehovah Witness	4	0.74%
Methodist	25	4.47%
Moravian	28	5.03%
Nazarene	3	0.56%
None/no religion	37	6.52%
Pentecostal	109	19.18%
Rastafarian	3	0.56%
Roman Catholic	27	4.84%
Wesleyan Holiness	13	2.23%
Other	12	2.05%
Don't know/Not stated	2	0.37%
Total	566	100.00%
NotApp :	1	

Internet Use in Golden Grove
Q55 Internet Use	Counts	%
Yes	206	36.25%
No	343	60.41%
Don't know/Not stated	19	3.35%
Total	567	100.00%

Country of birth data for Golden Grove
Q58. Country of birth	Counts	%
Africa	1	0.19%
Antigua and Barbuda	354	62.45%
Other Caribbean countries	1	0.19%
Other Asian countries	1	0.19%
Dominica	44	7.81%
Dominican Republic	2	0.37%
Guyana	70	12.27%
Jamaica	58	10.22%
Monsterrat	8	1.49%
St. Kitts and Nevis	5	0.93%
St. Lucia	3	0.56%
St. Vincent and the Grenadines	5	0.93%
Trinidad and Tobago	3	0.56%
USA	2	0.37%
USVI United States Virgin Islands	2	0.37%
Not Stated	6	1.12%
Total	567	100.00%

Country of citizenship data for Golden Grove
Q71 Country of Citizenship 1	Counts	%
Antigua and Barbuda	461	81.23%
Other Caribbean countries	3	0.56%
Dominica	19	3.35%
Dominican Republic	1	0.19%
Guyana	27	4.83%
Jamaica	45	7.99%
Monsterrat	3	0.56%
St. Lucia	1	0.19%
St. Vincent and the Grenadines	3	0.56%
USA	1	0.19%
Not Stated	2	0.37%
Total	567	100.00%

Country of second citizenship data for Golden Grove
Q71 Country of Citizenship 2 (Country of Second Citizenship)	Counts	%
Other Caribbean countries	6	4.88%
Canada	2	1.63%
Dominica	23	17.89%
Dominican Republic	2	1.63%
Guyana	50	38.21%
Jamaica	22	17.07%
Monsterrat	5	4.07%
St. Lucia	3	2.44%
St. Vincent and the Grenadines	2	1.63%
Trinidad and Tobago	2	1.63%
United Kingdom	5	4.07%
USA	5	4.07%
Other countries	1	0.81%
Total	130	100.00%
NotApp :	437	

Business earning data for Golden Grove
Q91 Business Earning	Counts	%
Under $1,000 EC per month	4	20.00%
1,000 to $1,999 EC per month	4	20.00%
2,000 to $2,999 EC per month	6	30.00%
3,000 to $4,999 EC per month	1	5.00%
$5,000 EC and over per month	5	25.00%
Total	21	100.00%
NotApp :	528	
Missing :	18	

Employment status data for Golden Grove
Employment status	Counts	%
Employed	243	56.48%
Unemployed	59	13.69%
Inactive	129	29.83%
Total	431	100.00%
NotApp :	136	

Money overseas data for Golden Grove
Q117 MoneyOverseas (Money from friends and relatives overseas)	Counts	%
Under 100 EC$	428	99.27%
1,000 to 1,999 EC$	2	0.49%
5,000 to 99,999 EC$	1	0.24%
Total	431	100.00%
NotApp :	136	
