= Joanne Massiah =

Antiguan and Barbudan Politician

Joanne Maureen Massiah
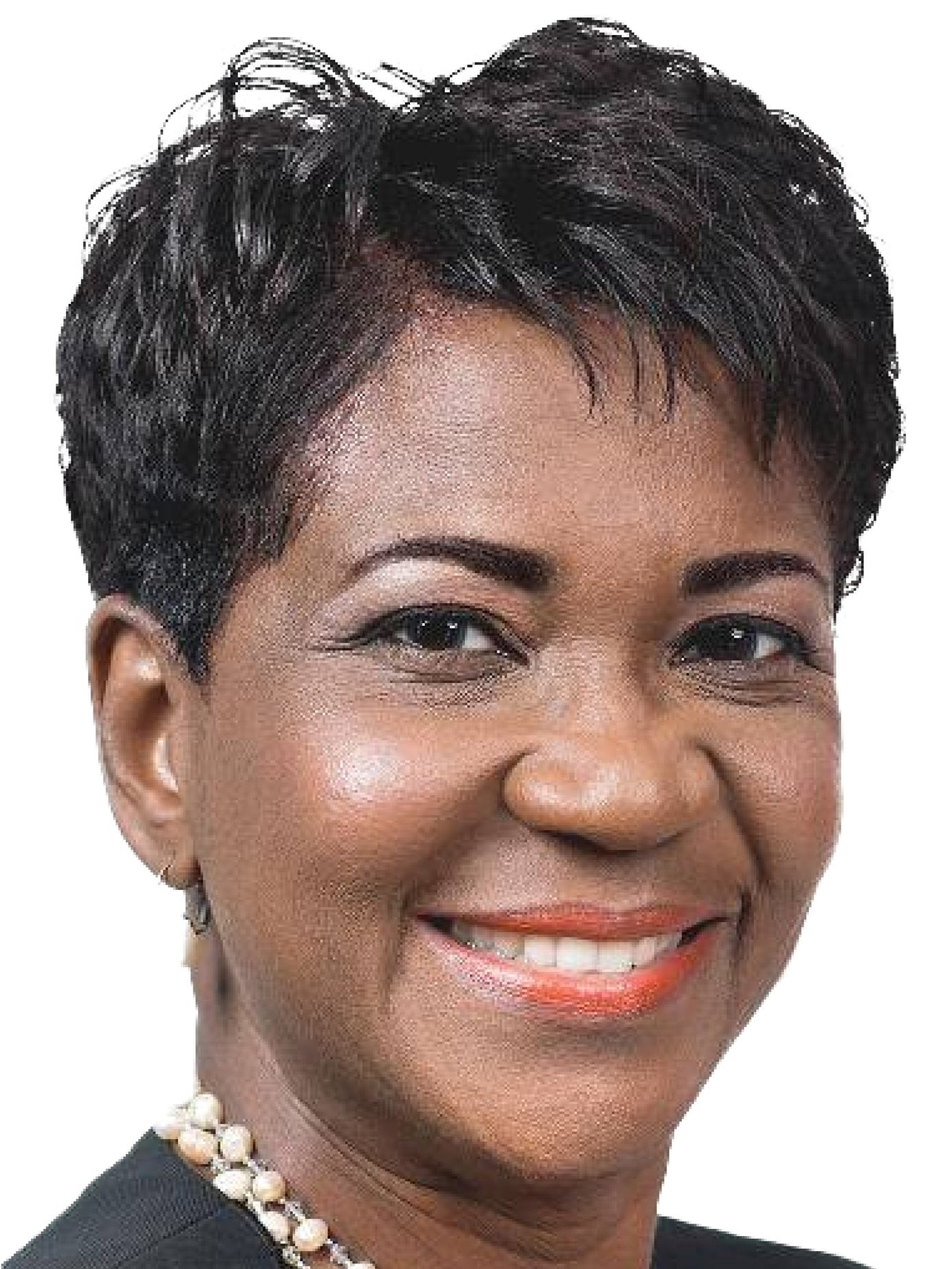

President of the Democratic National Alliance
- Incumbent
- Assumed office 2020
- Constituency: St. Philip's South

Personal details
- Born: All Saints, Antigua and Barbuda
- Education: City University of New York, University of Oregon Law School, John F. Kennedy School of Government

Joanne Maureen Massiah is an Antiguan and Barbudan politician and former Cabinet Minister and Member of Parliament for All Saints East and St. Luke. She is the President of the Democratic National Alliance.

== Career and advocacy ==
She worked as a Parliamentarian for 15 years from 2003 - 2018. She served as Minister in the Ministries of Agriculture, Lands, Marine Resources & Agro-Industry and of Legal Affairs respectively in the Government of Antigua & Barbuda from 2004 – 2014.

She has held several leadership positions in non-governmental organizations in Antigua and Barbuda and is an Executive Director of the Caribbean Institute for Women in Leadership (CIWiL). She has two adult sons and regularly counsels young people.
