= Philmore Benjamin =

Philmore Benjamin MP

Member of the House of Representatives of Antigua and Barbuda
- Incumbent
- Assumed office 30 April 2026
- Preceded by: Molwyn Joseph
- Constituency: St. Mary's North

Personal details
- Party: Antigua and Barbuda Labour Party

Philmore Benjamin is an Antiguan Labour Party politician, who was elected as Member of Parliament for St. Mary's North in the general election held on 30 April 2026. He is also the deputy speaker of the House of Representatives.
