= All Saints West =

- constituency for the Parliament of Antigua and Barbuda
- Polling divisions: 3
- Electorate: 5,351 (2026)

Current constituency
- Party: ABLP
- Member: Anthony Smith

All Saints West is a parliamentary constituency in Saint John, Saint Mary, and Saint Peter, Antigua and Barbuda. It is composed of the villages of Sea View Farm, Freemans, Clarkes Hill, Buckleys, St. Claire, Bellevue Heights, and the western portions of All Saints.

The constituency was dominated by the United Progressive Party during the 2023 general elections, however, the ABLP won a significant portion of the polling stations.

== Electoral history ==
Party	1984	1989	1994	1999	2004	2009	2014	2018	2023	2026
ALP	68.65%	66.58%	55.33%	53.01%	34.18%	39.15%	54.49%	54.31%	41.20%	55.48%
UPP	31.35%	31.33%	44.67%	46.99%	63.97%	59.11%	45.03%	43.42%	57.02%	44.52%
Others	0.00%	2.10%	0.00%	0.00%	1.85%	1.74%	0.48%	1.60%	1.20%	0.00%
Valid	1,311	1,478	1,784	2,179	3,128	3,052	3,544	3,178	3,527	3,506
Invalid	12	7	10	20	15	19	16		19	30
Total	1,323	1,485	1,794	2,199	3,143	3,071	3,560		3,546	3,536
Registered	1,780	2,153	2,560	3,108	3,450	3,874	3,959		5,021	5,351
Turnout	74.33%	68.97%	70.08%	70.75%	91.10%	79.27%	89.92%		70.62%	66.08%

== Members of parliament ==
The current member of parliament for the constituency is Anthony Smith. On 15 July 2024, Smith left the United Progressive Party, aligning himself with the Labour Party as an independent, however, he technically remains a member of the opposition.

Year	Winner	Party	% Votes	Notes
1984	Hilroy Humphreys	ALP	68.65%	ALP win
1989	Hilroy Humphreys	ALP	66.58%	ALP hold
1994	Hilroy Humphreys	ALP	55.33%	ALP hold
1999	Hilroy Humphreys	ALP	53.01%	ALP hold
2004	Chanlah Codrington	UPP	63.97%	UPP gain
2009	Chanlah Codrington	UPP	59.11%	UPP hold
2014	Michael Browne	ABLP	54.49%	ABLP gain
2018	Michael Browne	ABLP	54.67%	ABLP hold
2023	Anthony Smith	UPP	57.02%	UPP gain
2026	Anthony Smith	ABLP	55.48%	ABLP gain
