= Cobbs Cross =

- Village
- Interactive map of the Cobbs Cross main place
- Location within Antigua
- Coordinates: 17°1′28.56″N 61°45′57.56″W
- Country: Antigua and Barbuda
- Island: Antigua
- Civil parish: Saint Paul

Population (2011)
  - Total: 282
- Time zone: UTC-4 (AST)

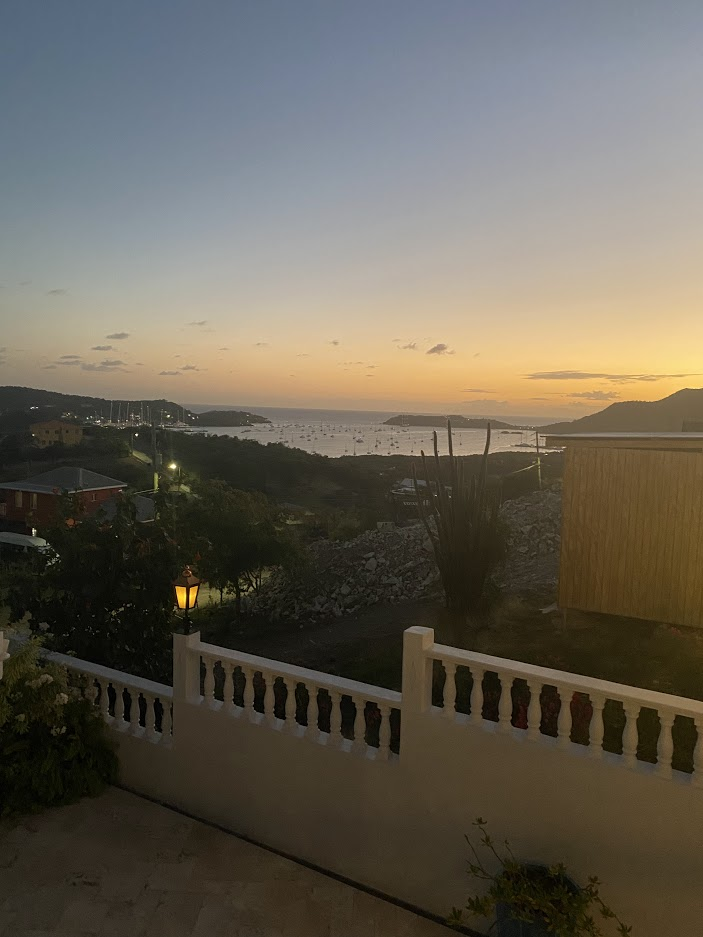
View from Cobb's Cross

Cobbs Cross is a village in Saint Paul Parish, Antigua and Barbuda.

== Demographics ==
Cobbs Cross has one enumeration district, ED 71700 CobbsCross.

=== Census data (2011) ===
==== Individual ====
Q48 Ethnic	Counts	%
African descendent	178	63.16%
Caucasian/White	86	30.45%
Mixed (Black/White)	5	1.88%
Mixed (Other)	8	3.01%
Other	1	0.38%
Don't know/Not stated	3	1.13%
Total	282	100.00%

Q49 Religion	Counts	%
Adventist	17	6.02%
Anglican	68	24.06%
Baptist	10	3.38%
Evangelical	5	1.88%
Jehovah Witness	4	1.50%
Methodist	59	21.05%
Moravian	12	4.14%
None/no religion	68	24.06%
Pentecostal	11	3.76%
Rastafarian	2	0.75%
Roman Catholic	5	1.88%
Wesleyan Holiness	1	0.38%
Other	17	6.02%
Don't know/Not stated	3	1.13%
Total	282	100.00%

Q55 Internet Use	Counts	%
Yes	188	66.54%
No	91	32.33%
Don't know/Not stated	3	1.13%
Total	282	100.00%

Q58. Country of birth	Counts	%
Africa	2	0.75%
Other Latin or North American countries	1	0.38%
Antigua and Barbuda	178	63.16%
Other Caribbean countries	1	0.38%
Canada	4	1.50%
Other Asian countries	2	0.75%
Other European countries	11	3.76%
Dominica	5	1.88%
Guyana	1	0.38%
Jamaica	4	1.50%
St. Kitts and Nevis	1	0.38%
United Kingdom	40	14.29%
USA	29	10.15%
USVI United States Virgin Islands	1	0.38%
Not Stated	1	0.38%
Total	282	100.00%

Q71 Country of Citizenship 1	Counts	%
Antigua and Barbuda	223	78.95%
Other Caribbean countries	1	0.38%
Canada	2	0.75%
Other Asian and Middle Eastern countries	1	0.38%
Dominica	3	1.13%
Jamaica	3	1.13%
United Kingdom	28	9.77%
USA	11	3.76%
Other countries	11	3.76%
Total	282	100.00%

Q71 Country of Citizenship 2 (Country of Second/Dual Citizenship)	Counts	%
Canada	6	8.82%
Other Asian and Middle Eastern countries	1	1.47%
Dominica	2	2.94%
Guyana	1	1.47%
United Kingdom	33	45.59%
USA	25	35.29%
Other countries	3	4.41%
Total	72	100.00%
NotApp :	210	

Employment status	Counts	%
Employed	140	61.68%
Unemployed	2	0.93%
Inactive	83	36.45%
Not stated	2	0.93%
Total	227	100.00%
NotApp :	55	

==== Household ====
Cobbs Cross has 103 households.

Total number of persons	Counts	%
1	27	26.21%
2	30	29.13%
3	14	13.59%
4	18	17.48%
5	12	11.65%
6	1	0.97%
7	1	0.97%
Total	103	100.00%

Q4 Year built	Counts	%
Before 1980	23	22.33%
1980 - 1989	17	16.50%
1990 - 1999	19	18.45%
2000 - 2006	16	15.53%
Year 2007	8	7.77%
Year 2009	2	1.94%
Year 2010	5	4.85%
Don't Know/not stated	13	12.62%
Total	103	100.00%

Q11 Garbage disposal	Counts	%
Garbage truck Private	2	1.94%
Garbage truck Public	100	97.09%
Other (inc. burning, burying, compost, dumping)	1	0.97%
Total	103	100.00%

Q23 3a Desktop Computer	Counts	%
Yes	40	38.83%
No	63	61.17%
Total	103	100.00%

Q23 3b Laptop Computer	Counts	%
Yes	64	62.14%
No	39	37.86%
Total	103	100.00%

Q23 10 Radio	Counts	%
Yes	69	66.99%
No	34	33.01%
Total	103	100.00%

Q23 9 Mobile Device	Counts	%
Yes	96	93.20%
No	7	6.80%
Total	103	100.00%

Q25 4 Internet access	Counts	%
No	36	34.95%
Yes	66	64.08%
Don't know/not declared	1	0.97%
Total	103	100.00%

Q24 Motor Vehicles	Counts	%
0	19	18.81%
1	52	51.49%
2	24	23.76%
3	5	4.95%
4 or more	1	0.99%
Total	101	100.00%
Missing :	2	
