= Commonwealth Observer Groups =

Election observer group

Commonwealth Observer Group (COG) is a team appointed by the Commonwealth Secretary-General to observe elections in member countries. Each group is usually made up of various statesmen from various countries in the Commonwealth of Nations. The job of each Group is to assess whether the elections are conducted fairly. At the end of the observation period, reports are written and submitted to the Commonwealth headquarters. The following are such groups formed to date:

- Antigua and Barbuda
- Bangladesh
- Cameroon
- Gambia
- Ghana
- Guyana
- Fiji
- Kenya
- Lesotho
- Malawi
- Maldives
- Malta
- Mozambique
- Nigeria
- Pakistan
- Papua New Guinea
- Sierra Leone
- South Africa
- Sri Lanka
- St Kitts and Nevis
- Tanzania
- Trinidad and Tobago
- Uganda
- Zambia
- Zimbabwe
