= St. Paul (constituency) =

- Constituency for the Parliament of Antigua and Barbuda
- Polling divisions: 2
- Electorate: 3,321 (2026)

Current constituency
- Party: ABLP
- Member: Paul Chet Greene

St. Paul is a parliamentary constituency in Saint Paul, Antigua and Barbuda. It is currently represented by foreign minister Paul Chet Greene. It is composed of the areas of Liberta, Table Hill Gardens, Falmouth, English Harbour, Cobbs Cross, and Nelson's Dockyard.

== Polling districts ==
St. Paul has two polling districts, "A" and "B". Polling district "A" is composed primarily of Liberta. Polling district "B" is composed primarily of Falmouth, Cobbs Cross, and English Harbour. During the 2023 general elections, polling district A was overwhelmingly dominated by the ABLP. Polling district B was dominated by the UPP.

== Electoral history ==
Party	1971	1976	1980	1984	1989	1994	1999	2004	2009	2014	2018	2023	2026
ALP	56.95%	61.46%	73.96%	77.45%	80.08%	64.69%	59.13%	43.82%	45.65%	59.28%	59.42%	52.11%	60.31%
UPP	-	-	-	4.18%	19.92%	35.31%	40.87%	56.18%	49.37%	39.53%	48.43%	46.12%	36.38%
PLM	39.80%	38.54%	26.04%	3.36%	-	-	-	-	-	-	-	-	-
Others	3.25%	0.00%	0.00%	15.00%	0.00%	0.00%	0.00%	0.00%	4.98%	1.18%	2.39%	1.21%	3.32%
Valid	799	1,484	1,229	1,100	1,220	1,532	2,031	2,307	2,469	2,451	2,204	2,374	2,202
Invalid	79	19	15	11	5	7	18	9	6	2	9	13	5
Total	878	1,503	1,244	1,111	1,225	1,539	2,049	2,316	2,475	2,453	2,213	2,387	2,207
Registered	1,750	1,570	1,646	1,783	2,042	2,344	3,004	2,556	3,049	2,734		3,281	3,321
Turnout	50.17%	95.73%	75.58%	62.31%	59.99%	65.66%	68.21%	90.61%	81.17%	89.72%		72.75%	66.46%

== Members of parliament ==
Year	Winner	Party	% Votes
1971	Ernest Williams	ABLP	56.95%
1976	Rodney Williams	ABLP	61.46%
1980	Rodney Williams	ABLP	73.96%
1984	Rodney Williams	ABLP	77.45%
1989	Rodney Williams	ABLP	80.08%
1994	Rodney Williams	ABLP	64.69%
1999	Rodney Williams	ABLP	59.13%
2004	Eleston Adams	UPP	56.18%
2009	Eleston Adams	UPP	49.37%
2014	Paul Chet Greene	ABLP	59.28%
2018	Paul Chet Greene	ABLP	59.66%
2023	Paul Chet Greene	ABLP	52.11%
2026	Paul Chet Greene	ABLP	60.31%
