= St. Mary's North =

- Parliamentary constituency for the Parliament of Antigua and Barbuda
- Parish: Saint Mary
- Polling divisions: 15
- Population: 3,494 (2011)
- Electorate: 5,347 (2026)
- Major settlements: Ebenezer, Jennings, Yorks, Hermitage, Dunnings, Brown Hill, Bendals, Emanuel Village, Bath Lodge, Cashew Hill, Brown’s Avenue, Martin’s Village, Golden Grove

Current constituency
- Created: 1971
- Seats: 1
- Party: ABLP
- Member: Philmore Benjamin

St. Mary's North is a parliamentary constituency in Saint Mary Parish, Antigua and Barbuda.

It has 4,322 registered voters as of 2018.

The constituencies counting centre is at the Antigua State College.

== Voting trends ==
Voting Trends
Party	1971	1976	1980	1984	1989	1994	1999	2004	2009	2014	2018	2023	2026
ABLP	40.28%	47.11%	45.85%	68.68%	58.48%	56.01%	51.55%	45.61%	50.01%	56.80%	60.40%	49.98%	57.90%
UPP	-	-	-	31.32%	38.05%	43.99%	47.96%	54.39%	49.42%	43.20%	39.15%	48.51%	42.10%
PLM	59.72%	52.89%	52.90%	-	-	-	-	-	-	-	-	-	-
Others	0.00%	0.00%	1.25%	0.00%	3.48%	0.00%	0.48%	0.00%	0.57%	0.00%	0.00%	0.84%	0.00%
Valid	916	1,469	1,845	1,322	1,811	2,312	2,896	3,488	3,513	3,678	3,102	3,307	3,007
Invalid	14	2	14	5	14	15	16	13	17	12	14	22	21
Total	930	1,471	1,859	1,327	1,825	2,327	2,912	3,501	3,530	3,690	3,116	3,329	3,028
Registered	1,743	1,526	2,410	2,694	3,020	3,840	4,680	3,885	4,536	4,127		5,171	5,347
Turnout	53.36%	96.40%	77.14%	49.26%	60.43%	60.60%	62.22%	90.12%	77.82%	89.41%		64.38%	56.63%

== Members of parliament ==
Member of Parliament
Year	Winner	Party	% Votes	Notes
1971	Robert Hall	PLM	59.72%	PLM win
1976	Robert Hall	PLM	52.89%	PLM hold
1980	Robert Hall	PLM	52.90%	PLM hold
1984	Molwyn Joseph	ALP	68.68%	ALP gain
1989	Molwyn Joseph	ALP	58.48%	ALP hold
1994	Molwyn Joseph	ALP	56.01%	ALP hold
1999	Molwyn Joseph	ALP	51.55%	ALP hold
2004	Bertrand Lemuel Joseph	UPP	54.39%	UPP gain
2009	Molwyn Joseph	ALP	50.01%	ALP gain
2014	Molwyn Joseph	ABLP	56.80%	ABLP hold
2018	Molwyn Joseph	ABLP	60.67%	ABLP hold
2023	Molwyn Joseph	ABLP	49.98%	ABLP hold
2026	Philmore Benjamin	ABLP	57.90%	ABLP hold
