= St. Peter (constituency) =

Antiguan Constituency

Coordinates: 17°5′22″N 61°45′47″W

- Parliamentary constituency for the Parliament of Antigua and Barbuda
- Parish: Saint Peter, Saint George, Saint John
- Polling divisions: 11
- Population: 3,408 (2011)
- Electorate: 4,886 (2026)
- Major settlements: Parham, Pares, Sugar Factory, Paynters Paradise

Current constituency
- Seats: 1
- Party: ABLP
- Member: Rawdon Turner

St. Peter is a constituency of the House of Representatives of Antigua and Barbuda that takes up portions of the Parish of Saint Peter, Parish of Saint George, and the Parish of Saint John.

It has 3,041 registered voters as of 2018.

The constituencies counting center is Parham Primary School in Parham Village.

== Electoral history ==
Party	1971	1976	1980	1984	1989	1994	1999	2004	2009	2014	2018	2023	2026
ABLP	51.79%	58.53%	80.40%	91.46%	89.64%	77.68%	62.75%	58.31%	63.24%	69.09%	73.12%	24.42%	60.31%
UPP	-	-	-	8.54%	5.92%	22.32%	34.33%	41.69%	36.76%	28.83%	24.30%	16.33%	27.80%
PLM	42.84%	41.47%	18.84%	-	-	-	-	-	-	-	-	-	-
Others	5.37%	0.00%	0.76%	0.00%	4.44%	0.00%	2.91%	0.00%	0.00%	2.08%	0.00%	58.85%	0.00%
Valid	782	1,102	791	656	608	914	1,133	1,986	2,511	2,504	2,313	3,666	2,845
Invalid	23	46	3	6	5	6	4	13	5	22	61	14	34
Total	805	1,148	794	662	613	920	1,137	1,999	2,516	2,526	2,374	3,680	2,879
Registered	1,311	1,194	955	1,018	1,077	1,404	1,679	2,181	3,082	2,849		4,609	4,886
Turnout	61.40%	96.15%	83.14%	65.03%	56.92%	65.53%	67.72%	91.66%	81.64%	88.66%		79.84%	58.92%

== Members of parliament ==
Representative in Parliament
Year	Winner	Party	% Votes
1971	Joseph Myers	ALP	51.79%
1976	Joseph Myers	ALP	58.53%
1980	Joseph Myers	ALP	80.40%
1984	Joseph Myers	ALP	91.46%
1989	Joseph Myers	ALP	89.64%
1994	Longford Jeremy	ALP	77.68%
1999	Longford Jeremy	ALP	62.75%
2004	Asot Michael	ALP	58.31%
2009	Asot Michael	ALP	63.24%
2014	Asot Michael	ABLP	69.09%
2018	Asot Michael	ABLP	73.90%
2023	Asot Michael	IND	58.07%
2025 by-election	Rawdon Turner	ABLP	74.58%
2026	Rawdon Turner	ABLP	72.20%

== Villages ==
The constituency comprises the villages of Parham, Pares, Sugar Factory, Gunthorpes, Weirs, North Sound, and Donavans.
