= Antigua State College =

Educational institution in Antigua and Barbuda

Coordinates: 17°06′00″N 61°50′22″W

- Motto: Empowerment Through Education
- Type: Public
- Established: 1977
- Principal: Mr. Hyram Forde
- Students: 1000
- Location: Golden Grove, Antigua and Barbuda
- Campus: Urban
- Colors: Yellow; Green
- Website: www.asc.edu.ag

Antigua and Barbuda College of Advanced Studies (Formerly Antigua State College) is a public tertiary institution in Antigua and Barbuda, with 1,000 students enrolled in several programs. The college consists of several departments such as the Advanced Level, Department of business, engineering, department of undergraduate studies, teacher education (offsite) and school of pharmacy (off-site).

== History ==
Antigua State College was established on the Hill at Golden Grove, Antigua and Barbuda, in 1977, by the merger of two already existing institutions. The first, Leeward Islands Teachers’ Training College, continuing in the traditions of Spring Gardens Teacher Training College, served students from all over the Leeward Islands, incorporating numerous island nations. The second, Golden Grove Technical College, was launched in 1972 under British sponsorship. It was made up of the Hotel and Catering Department, the Commercial Department and the Engineering and Construction Department.

In 1978, the Advanced Level Department was added when all sixth forms in the local secondary schools were brought together at Antigua State College. These five departments were combined under the leadership of Dr. Alister Francis, founding principal. In 1981, the Hotel and Catering Department was moved to Dutchman’s Bay to become the new Hotel Training Centre.

Since the creation of the college, the population has grown from around one hundred fifty students in 1977 to over one thousand students in 2011. During this period, there have been several landmarks in the life of Antigua State College, linked mainly with improved accommodations and the introduction of new programs. These include the introduction of the First Year University Program and the Business Studies Program. All programs run in conjunction with the University of the West Indies, Cave Hill Campus.

== Current status ==
Antigua State College continues to grow, offering a wide variety of courses in Tertiary Level Education each year to students in its seven departments. It caters to a wide range of students, while assisting with the development of Antigua and Barbuda, by providing training relevant to the specific needs of Antiguan and Barbudan society.
