= Paul Chet Greene =

Antiguan politician and football player (born 1964)

The Honourable Paul Chet Greene
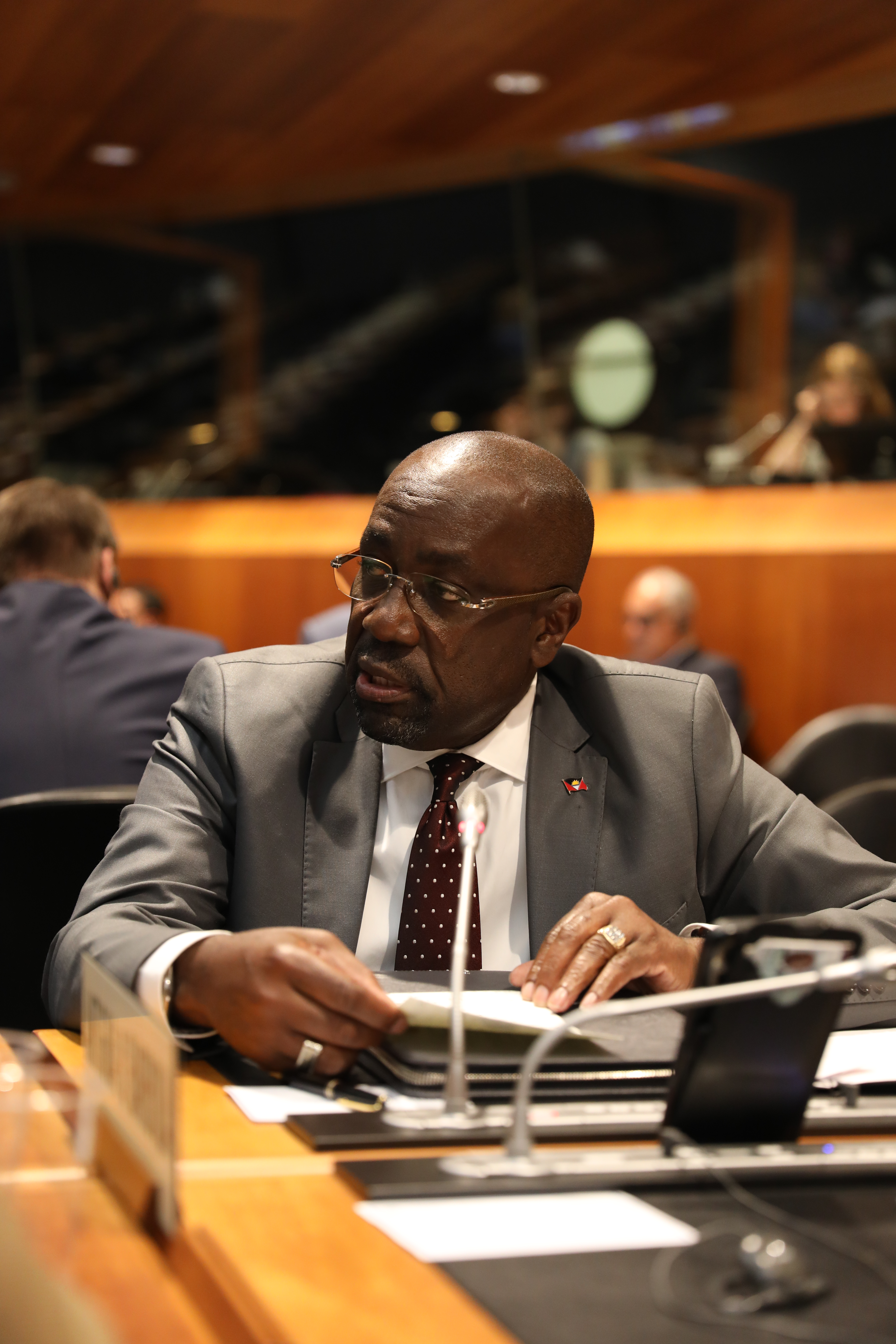

Minister of Foreign Affairs, Agriculture, Trade & Barbuda Affairs
- Incumbent
- Assumed office 22 March 2018
- Preceded by: Charles Fernandez

Member of the Antigua and Barbuda Parliament for Saint Paul
- Incumbent
- Assumed office 13 June 2014
- Preceded by: Eleston Adams

Personal details
- Born: 15 January 1964 (age 62) Liberta, Saint Paul
- Party: Antigua and Barbuda Labour Party

E. Paul Chet Greene (born 15 January 1964) is a Member of the Antigua and Barbuda House of Representatives, and a Cabinet Minister.

== Early life ==
Chet was born and raised in Liberta. He was educated at the Liberta Primary School and the All Saints Secondary School. Chet received a degree in sports administration from the Université de Poitiers in France.

After becoming involved in sports administration, he served as Commissioner of Sports in the Ministry of Sports and was then appointed as President of the Antigua and Barbuda Olympic Association. He has continued to serve in this position as President, but faced significant calls to resign in 2016 after he agreed to a deal to sell tickets with a non-authorized 2016 Summer Olympics seller.

== Political career ==
Greene won the St. Paul constituency in the 2014 general election, defeating Elson Adams. Six days later, he was appointed Minister of Trade, Commerce and Industries, Sports, Culture, Community Services. Greene served as Chairman of the Antigua and Barbuda Labour Party at the time of his appointment as minister.

He won his seat again in the 2018 election and was appointed Minister of Foreign Affairs, International Trade, and Immigration on 22 March 2018, by Prime Minister Gaston Browne, one day after the 2018 parliamentary elections. During his time as Minister of Foreign Affairs, he has criticized the G20's "Call to Action on Global Governance Report", as he stated it must address climate change and small island developing states. In 2025, he affirmed that he would maintain strong ties to the U.S., and called for Antiguans and Barbudans to comply with U.S. immigration laws following mass deportations.

Greene was elected again to the House of Representatives in the 2023 general elections for the St. Paul Constituency and confirmed as Minister of Foreign Affairs, International Trade, and Immigration in the Government of the Prime Minister Gaston Browne.

== See also ==
- Gaston Browne
- Charles Fernandez
