= St. John's Rural West =

Parliamentary constituency in Antigua and Barbuda

- Constituency for the Parliament of Antigua and Barbuda
- Polling divisions: 3
- Electorate: 5,709 (2026)

Current constituency
- Party: UPP
- Member: Michael Joseph

St. John's Rural West is a parliamentary constituency in Saint John, Antigua and Barbuda. It is composed of the entirety of Five Islands. The constituency has three polling divisions and includes areas of St. John's and the Five Islands peninsula.

The constituency has three polling divisions, A, B, and C. During the 2023 general elections, all three polling divisions voted in support of the United Progressive Party.

== Electoral history ==
| Party | 1971 | 1976 | 1980 | 1984 | 1989 | 1994 | 1999 | 2004 | 2009 | 2014 | 2018 | 2023 | 2026 |
|---|---|---|---|---|---|---|---|---|---|---|---|---|---|
| ALP | 42.43% | 51.60% | 56.41% | 58.17% | 46.97% | 34.37% | 37.39% | 38.82% | 43.69% | 49.62% | 50.86% | 44.40% | 57.59% |
| UPP | - | - | - | 41.83% | 53.03% | 65.63% | 62.61% | 61.18% | 56.31% | 50.38% | 45.39% | 53.14% | 42.30% |
| PLM | 56.01% | 48.40% | 40.48% | - | - | - | - | - | - | - | - | - | - |
| Others | 1.56% | 0.00% | 3.11% | 0.00% | 0.00% | 0.00% | 0.00% | 0.00% | 0.00% | 0.00% | 3.35% | 2.11% | 0.11% |
| Valid | 1,855 | 2,680 | 2,216 | 1,841 | 2,033 | 2,450 | 2,856 | 3,395 | 4,012 | 3,956 | 3,366 | 3,623 | 3,466 |
| Invalid | 33 | 34 | 90 | 13 | 19 | 17 | 17 | 8 | 9 | 22 | | 12 | 13 |
| Total | 1,888 | 2,714 | 2,306 | 1,854 | 2,052 | 2,467 | 2,873 | 3,403 | 4,021 | 3,978 | | 3,635 | 3,479 |
| Registered | 3,720 | 2,885 | 3,137 | 3,278 | 3,714 | 4,244 | 4,883 | 3,803 | 4,996 | 4,493 | | 5,440 | 5,709 |
| Turnout | 50.75% | 94.07% | 73.51% | 56.56% | 55.25% | 58.13% | 58.84% | 89.48% | 80.48% | 88.54% | | 66.82% | 60.94% |

== Members of parliament ==
The current member of parliament for the constituency is Richard Lewis.

| Year | Winner | Party | % Votes |
|---|---|---|---|
| 1971 | Selvyn Walter | PLM | 56.01% |
| 1976 | Donald Christian | ALP | 51.60% |
| 1980 | Donald Christian | ALP | 56.41% |
| 1984 | Donald Christian | ALP | 58.17% |
| 1989 | Baldwin Spencer | UNDP | 53.03% |
| 1994 | Baldwin Spencer | UPP | 65.63% |
| 1999 | Baldwin Spencer | UPP | 62.61% |
| 2004 | Baldwin Spencer | UPP | 61.18% |
| 2009 | Baldwin Spencer | UPP | 56.31% |
| 2014 | Baldwin Spencer | UPP | 50.38% |
| 2018 | Londell Benjamin | ABLP | 52.63% |
| 2023 | Richard Lewis | UPP | 53.14% |
| 2026 | Michael Joseph | ABLP | 57.59% |
