= Crime in Antigua and Barbuda =

Crime in Antigua and Barbuda is generally considered to be low. Under the Constitution of Antigua and Barbuda, the Parliament of Antigua and Barbuda and the Barbuda Council may make criminal legislation. The main law enforcement agency in the country is the Royal Police Force of Antigua and Barbuda, with the participation of other agencies responsible for the national security of Antigua and Barbuda. The Antigua and Barbuda Defence Force, the nation's military, is also involved in law enforcement.

Crime in Antigua and Barbuda is increasing, primarily due to a large influx of young CARICOM nationals into the country. In 2019, Antigua and Barbuda had a homicide rate of 2.4, and in 2022, a homicide rate of 10.7. This is significantly lower than crime rates in Saint Lucia, Saint Kitts and Nevis and Barbados, as well as nearly every other country in the Caribbean except for Grenada. People living in Saint John are most likely to be crime victims as of 2011, while people living in the tourist-dominated Saint Mary are the least likely. Crime is also extremely rare in Barbuda, with the last murder occurring on a party yacht in 1994.

== Types of crime ==
Violent crime is particularly rare in Antigua and Barbuda. In the year preceding 2011, 1,365 households experienced a crime, with 233 of those households experiencing murder. 75 households experienced a criminal wounding, 34 a rape, 26 a shooting. By far, the most common crime in Antigua and Barbuda was housebreaking (violent or non-violent), with 861 households (63.12% of crime impacted households) experiencing it. Property crime is the most common type of crime in Antigua and Barbuda. In the year preceding 2011, 159 households had experienced auto theft.

== Refusal to report crime ==
In the year preceding 2011, 359 households that were victims of crime refused to report it. The most common reason was no confidence in the administration of justice (32.03%), and the crime not being serious enough (24.51%). 40.11% of households that did not report a crime refused to state a reason. Only 0.84% of households said they were afraid of the perpetrator, and 2.51% stated other reasons. Mistrust in the administration of justice is particularly common in Saint John, where 37.39% of households that refused to report in the city and 37.50% in "rural" areas stated this reason.

== Geography of crime ==
Out of the 1,365 households that had experienced a crime in the year preceding 2011, 17.07% had experienced a murder. Crime-impacted households were most likely to be victims of murder in Saint Philip (25%), while Barbudan households (0%) and households in Saint Mary (8.06%) were the least likely to be impacted by murder. However, kidnapping is most common in Barbuda (one household impacted) and Saint Mary (four households). The national average is 2.79% of crime-impacted households being victims of kidnapping. In 2011, some parishes were also reported to be rape or shooting-free.

== See also ==
- National security of Antigua and Barbuda
- Law of Antigua and Barbuda
- Fear of crime
