= Orden David =

Antiguan human rights activist (born 1985)

- Born: 1985 or 1986 (age 40–41)
- Disappeared: 26 January 2025
- Status: Missing for 1 year, 9 months and 23 days

Orden Passo David (born 1985 or 1986) is an Antiguan human rights activist. A long-time member of the Ministry of Health, Wellness, Environment and Civil Service Affairs' AIDS Secretariat, in 2022 he became known as one of the claimants of a case that led to discrimination against LGBTQ people becoming illegal in Antigua and Barbuda. David disappeared in January 2025; his whereabouts remain unknown.

== Early life ==
David was born in 1985 or 1986 in Bolans, a village in the Saint Mary parish on the island of Antigua. Raised Christian, he stated he first recognised himself as being gay at the age of nine. David later stopped attending church after parishioners urged him to undergo conversion therapy, though continued to identify as a Christian.

From a young age, David experienced significant bullying, including in person and on social media, which he attributed to his feminine presentation. He had been assaulted on at least two occasions, including while working at a hospital, during which he was beaten into unconsciousness. David criticised the Royal Police Force of Antigua and Barbuda's responses to crimes he reported, accusing officers of not taking the reports seriously, and focusing on his sexuality; for example, asking him "why are you gay?" while he attempted to report a robbery he had been subjected to.

== Activism ==
=== AIDS Secretariat and community activism ===
In 2014, David began working for the Ministry of Health's AIDS Secretariat as a counsellor and tester; in the role, he provided sexual health and therapeutic services to Antiguan citizens, including those living with HIV and AIDS. David also provided outreach work on a voluntary basis with sex workers operating in St. John's, the capital of Antigua and Barbuda, including providing advice and contraception.

David was the founder and president of Meeting Emotional and Social Needs Holistically, a non-governmental organisation providing practical and therapeutic support to Antigua and Barbuda's LGBTQ community.

=== Orden David et al v The Attorney General of Antigua and Barbuda ===
In 2022, David, alongside the Antigua and Barbuda-based human rights organisation Women Against Rape, and with the support of the regional Eastern Caribbean Alliance for Diversity and Equality, filed a case with the High Court of Antigua and Barbuda and the Eastern Caribbean Supreme Court. Their case argued that sections 12 and 15 of the Sexual Offences Act, 1995, which criminalised "buggery" and "serious indecency", made illegal consensual same-sex activity and contradicted LGBTQ people's rights to liberty, protection of the law, freedom of expression, protection of personal privacy, and protection from sex discrimination, as enshrined in the Constitution of Antigua and Barbuda.

On 5 July 2026, the Court struck down sections 12 and 15 of the Sexual Offences Act, finding that it "contradicted" articles 3, 12 and 14 of the Constitution, and "stigmatised" same-sex couples by criminalising them for something that was "part of their human experience". The government of Antigua and Barbuda confirmed it would not appeal the decision.

== Disappearance ==
At around 23:30 AST on 25 January 2025, David was seen leaving a casino on Market Street in St. John's, stopping by the Percival's petrol station on Fort Road; this was the last recorded sighting of him. The following day, he was reported missing by friends and family at Bolans Police Station after he failed to respond to attempts to contact him.

On 29 January, the Concerned Citizens Group began a search in northern and eastern Antigua, supported by the Antigua and Barbuda Defence Force, members of the AIDS Secretariat, and MP Kelvin Simon. They subsequently organised searches in the south of the island. In February 2025, the Royal Police Force of Antigua and Barbuda announced it was launching a wide-scale search for David following the discovery of his burned-out car hidden in bushes near a secondary school in Pares.

In July 2025, friends and family of David raised concerns about a lack of progress and information concerning the investigation into David's disappearance from Antiguan authorities. They queried whether a body found at that time was David, though a spokesperson from the police stated a DNA sample had been sent abroad for testing; it was not confirmed to be David.

David remains missing as of January 2026. To commemorate one year since his disappearance, the Eastern Caribbean Alliance for Diversity and Equality stated that the search for David remained active and called for people with any information to come forward. In November 2026, David was memorialised at a World AIDS Day fair held in his hometown of Bolans.
