= Law of Antigua and Barbuda =

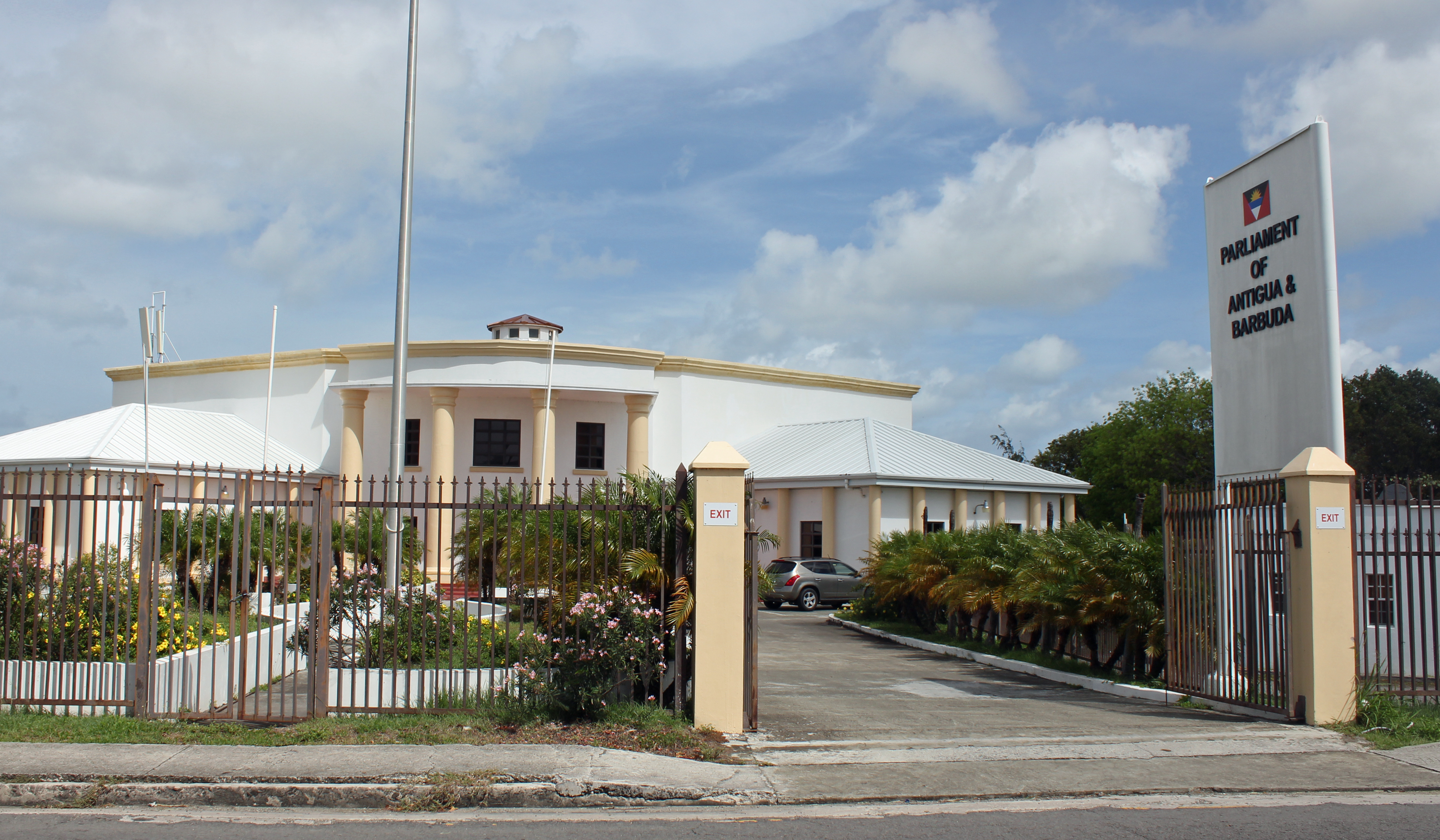
Antigua and Barbuda Parliament Building

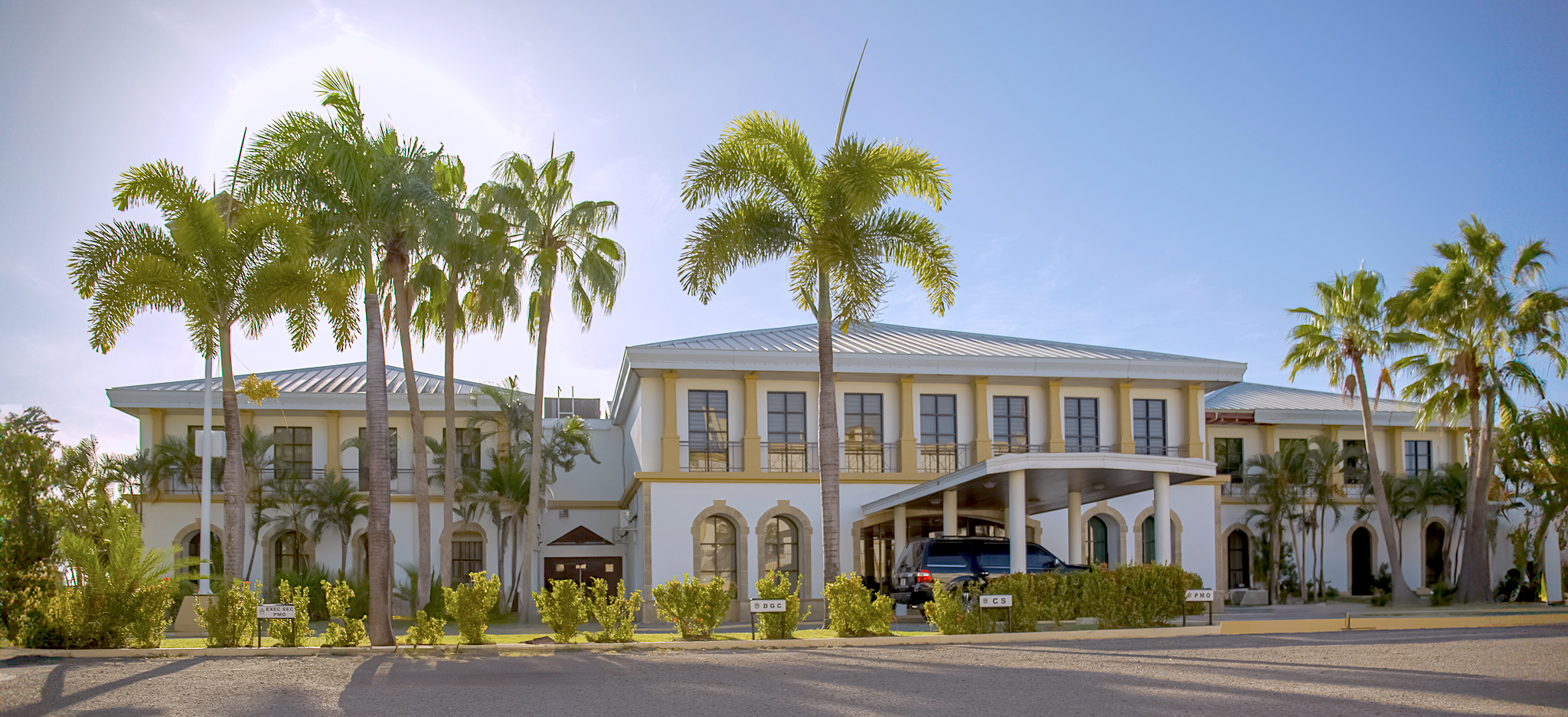
Office of the Prime Minister

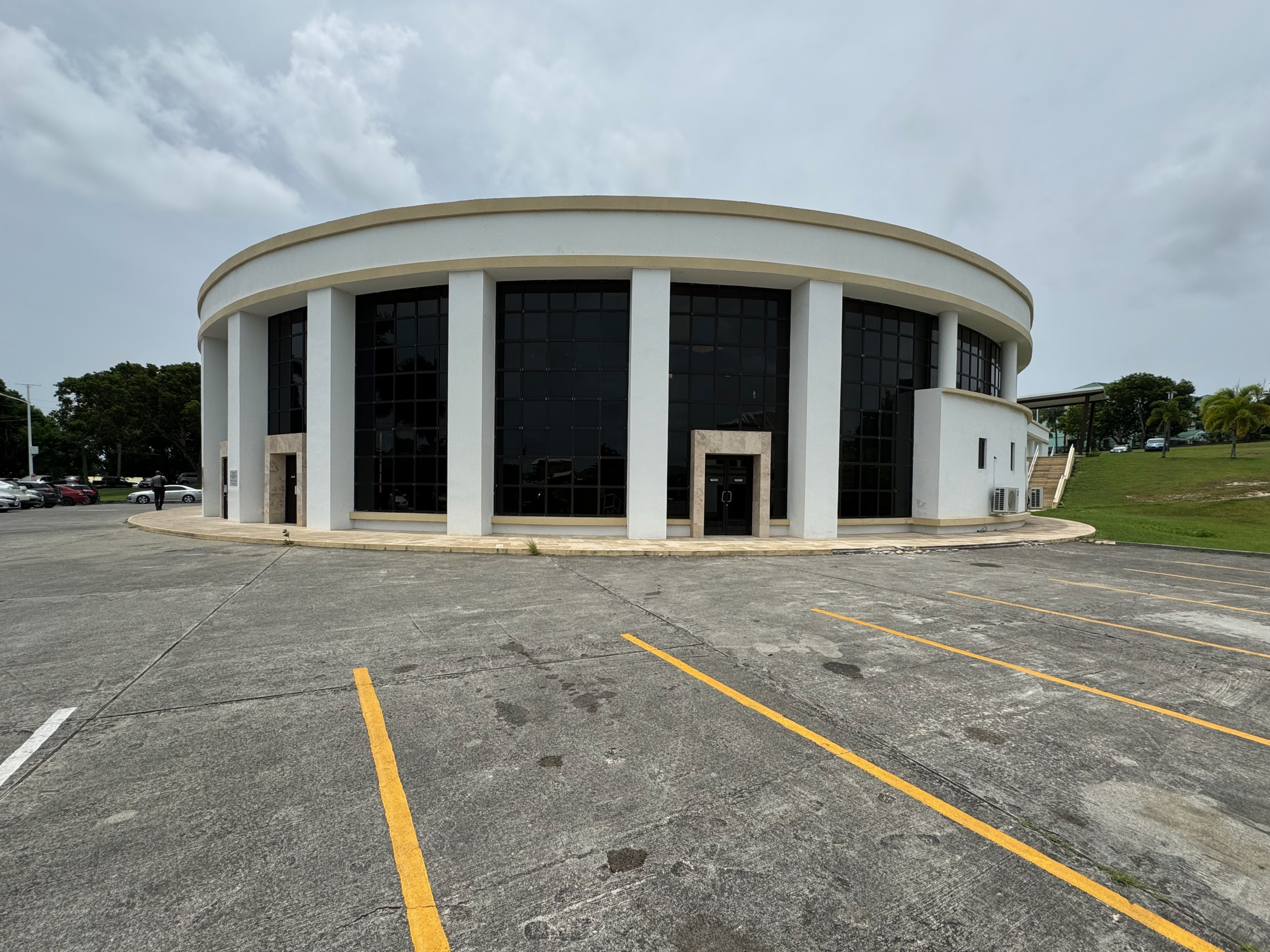
Antigua and Barbuda High Court

The law of Antigua and Barbuda consists of constitutional, statutory, and common law. The highest law in the country is the Constitution of Antigua and Barbuda, from which all other laws of the country derive their authority. Antigua and Barbuda has a Westminster style common law legal system with a written constitution that provides for a parliamentary democracy. Antigua and Barbuda has a system of judicial review of primary legislation.

== Constitutional law ==
The Constitution of Antigua and Barbuda was adopted by the Antigua and Barbuda Constitution Order of 1981, going into force on 1 November. The Constitution is the source of power for the executive, judicial, and legislative branches. The Antigua and Barbuda High Court and other superior courts exercise the power of judicial review and may strike down legislation they deem illegal. The Constitution may be amended only by referendum after approval by both houses of parliament. Only citizens of Antigua and Barbuda may vote in these referendums.

== Statute law ==
Parliament makes statute law. Acts of the Parliament of Antigua and Barbuda are numbered by year and are usually divided into sections. Bills may be introduced in either house of parliament, except for money bills that may only be introduced in the House of Representatives. All laws that were in effect in the Associated State of Antigua were transferred to the newly independent Antigua and Barbuda, unless they were incompatible with the Constitution. As the country changed official name, the governor-general was permitted to amend, for one year, any legislation that did not include the new country's name. The statute law of Antigua and Barbuda includes legislation passed by the former Parliament of Antigua (1967–1981) and the former Legislative Council of Antigua (–1967).

Parliament may not amend the Barbuda Local Government Act without the consent of the Barbuda Council through a resolution, under section 123 of the Constitution.

== Secondary legislation ==
According to section 46 of the Constitution, Parliament may make laws for the country. Parliament has delegated the power to make legislation to various agencies and entities, with this legislation known as statutory instruments. In addition, by-laws may be made under an act of parliament, such as by-laws of the Barbuda Council.

== Common law ==
Common law was extended to Antigua and Barbuda by the Common Law (Declaration of Application) Act, 1705. Under the Constitution, any person may appeal to the High Court if they deem that portions of the Constitution are being violated. Questions may also be referred to the High Court if a subordinate court believes that a ruling would have a significant impact on the law. Decisions may be appealed to the Supreme Court of the Eastern Caribbean Supreme Court, and, further, to the Judicial Committee of the Privy Council.

== See also ==
- Judiciary of Antigua and Barbuda
- Parliament of Antigua and Barbuda
- Cabinet of Antigua and Barbuda
