= Antiguan and Barbudan passport =

Travel document

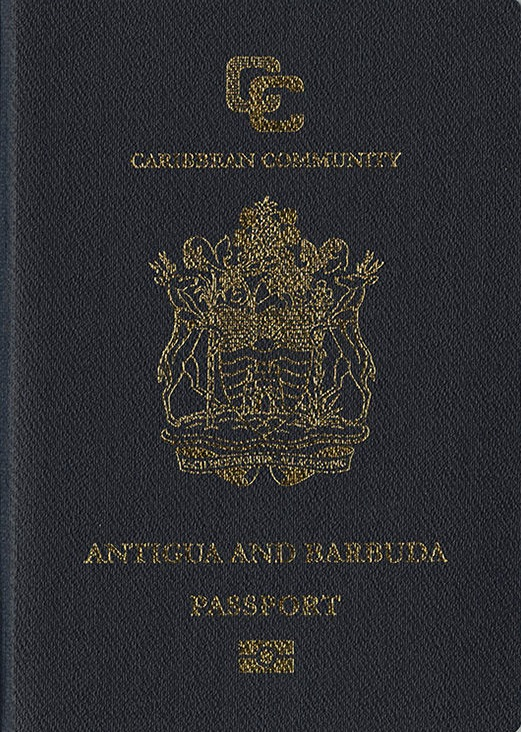
- Front cover of a biometric Antiguan and Barbudan passport
- Type: Passport
- Issued by: Antigua and Barbuda
- Purpose: Identification
- Eligibility: Antiguan and Barbudan citizenship
- Expiration: 10 years (5 years for children under 16)

Antiguan and Barbudan passports are issued to nationals of Antigua and Barbuda for international travel. The passport is a CARICOM passport as Antigua and Barbuda is a member of the Caribbean Community.

== History ==
Before Antigua and Barbuda achieved its independence from the United Kingdom in November 1981, the territory was a crown colony, and British territory passports were used for international travel.

== Types ==
There are several types of Antiguan and Barbudan passports:

- Regular Passport (navy blue cover): These passports are issued to any citizen of Antigua and Barbuda.
- Diplomatic Passport (red cover): These passports are issued to an authorized set of persons who represent Antigua and Barbuda in diplomatic and other international affairs such as Ministers of Government.
- Official Passport (green cover): This type of passport is issued to government officials who are representing Antigua and Barbuda’s Interests overseas.

== Physical appearance ==
- Ordinary passports are navy blue, with the Coat of arms of Antigua and Barbuda emblazoned in the centre of the front cover.
  The CC logo of the caricom and right below it the words "CARIBBEAN COMMUNITY" are centred on the top (above the Coat of arms), and the words "ANTIGUA AND BARBUDA" and "PASSPORT" in that order are centred on the bottom (below the Coat of arms), with the biometric passport symbol positioned below them.

- Diplomatic passports are burgundy, with the Coat of arms of Antigua and Barbuda emblazoned in the centre of the front cover.
  The CC logo of the caricom and right below it the words "CARIBBEAN COMMUNITY" are centred on the top (above the Coat of arms), and the words "ANTIGUA AND BARBUDA" and "DIPLOMATIC PASSPORT" in that order are centred on the bottom (below the Coat of arms), with the biometric passport symbol positioned below them.

- Official passports are green, with the Coat of arms of Antigua and Barbuda emblazoned in the centre of the front cover.
  The CC logo of the caricom and right below it the words "CARIBBEAN COMMUNITY" are centred on the top (above the Coat of arms), and the words "ANTIGUA AND BARBUDA" and "OFFICIAL PASSPORT" in that order are centred on the bottom (below the Coat of arms), with the biometric passport symbol positioned below them.

=== Information page ===
Antigua and Barbuda passports include the following data on the information page:

- Photo of the passport holder
- Type (“PA” for ordinary passports, “PD” for diplomatic passports, “PO” for official passports)
- Country Code (ATG)
- Passport number
- Surname and Given name of the passport holder
- Nationality
- Date of Birth (DD/MM/YYYY)
- Sex
- Place of birth (For people born in Antigua and Barbuda the name of the Parish or Dependency of birth followed by the country code is written, for people born outside Antigua and Barbuda only the country of birth is written)
- Date of issue (DD/MM/YYYY)
- Authority of Issue
- Date of expiry (DD/MM/YYYY)
- Holder's signature

The information page ends with the machine readable zone.

The items are identified by text in English and Antiguan and Barbudan Creole

=== Passport note ===
The passports contain inside the front cover a note In English that is addressed to the authorities of all countries and territories, identifying the bearer as a citizen of Antigua and Barbuda and requesting that he or she be allowed to pass and be treated according to international norms:

These are to request and require in the name of the Governor-General of Antigua and Barbuda all those whom it may concern to allow the bearer to pass freely without let or hindrance, and to afford the bearer such assistance and protection as may be necessary.

== Visa requirements ==
As of 15 December 2024, Antiguan and Barbudan citizens had visa-free or visa on arrival access (including eTAs) to 153 countries and territories, ranking the Antiguan and Barbudan passport 27th in the world in terms of travel freedom.

In 2009, the Antiguan and Barbudan Government signed a visa waiver agreement with the European Union which allows an Antiguan and Barbudan citizen to visit the Schengen area without a visa for a period of 3 months within any 6-month period following the date of first entry into any EU country.

In 2016, Antiguan and Barbudan passport holders enjoyed visa-free or visa on arrival access (including eTAs) to 134 countries and territories, ranking the passport as the 30th best passport in the world according to the Visa Restrictions Index. Antiguan and Barbudan passport holders may travel to Hong Kong, Singapore, the UK, and Europe, among others, with relative ease and without challenging visa requirements.

As of 27 June 2017, citizens of Antigua and Barbuda will need a visa to visit Canada. From that date, any existing electronic travel authorizations (eTAs) issued to a citizen of Antigua and Barbuda will become null and void, and affected individuals who had previously been issued an eTA will no longer be able to use that eTA for the purposes of traveling to Canada.

== See also ==
- Caribbean passport
- Henley Passport Index
- Visa requirements for Antigua and Barbuda citizens
- Visa policy of Antigua and Barbuda
