= Sexual Offences Act, 1995 =

Act of the Parliament of Antigua and Barbuda

The Sexual Offences Act, 1995 is an Act of the Parliament of Antigua and Barbuda. It replaced all previous law on sexual offences, codifying a wide range of offences including rape, "marital sexual assault" (i.e. marital rape), sexual intercourse with minors and mentally subnormal people, incest, buggery, bestiality, indecent assault, "serious indecency", procuration, procuring defilement of a person, detention or abduction of a person for sexual purposes, brothel-keeping, and living on the earnings of prostitution.

As of 2022, it remains in force, with the exception of sections 12 and 15, which have been struck down by the High Court.

== Criminalization of homosexual acts ==
Section 12 of the Act specified that buggery, defined as "sexual intercourse per anum by a male person with a male person or by a male person with a female person" was illegal. Section 15 also specified that "serious indecency", defined as "an act, other than sexual intercourse (whether natural or unnatural) by a person involving the use of the genital organ for the purpose of arousing or gratifying sexual desire" was illegal, with the exception of such acts being carried out by persons of opposite sexes. Both offences carried substantial prison sentences, even when carried out between consenting adults. Effectively, this made all homosexual sex acts illegal in Antigua and Barbuda.

Both of these sections were struck down by the High Court of Antigua and Barbuda in 2022, on the basis that they were unconstitutional under the rights granted by the Constitution of Antigua and Barbuda. The court case against the legislation was supported by Women Against Rape and the Eastern Caribbean Alliance for Diversity and Equality.

== See also ==
- LGBT rights in Antigua and Barbuda
