= LGBTQ rights in Antigua and Barbuda =

- Antigua and Barbuda
- Legal status: Legal since 2022
- Gender identity: No
- Military: Yes
- Discrimination protections: Since 2022

Family rights
- Recognition of relationships: No recognition of same-sex relationships
- Adoption: None

Lesbian, gay, bisexual, transgender and queer (LGBTQ) persons in Antigua and Barbuda may face legal challenges not experienced by non-LGBTQ citizens.

On 5 July 2022, the Eastern Caribbean Supreme Court ruled that sections of the Penal Code that made consensual same-sex intimacy illegal were unconstitutional, and therefore void. In its ruling, the court set precedent that the constitution protections against sex discrimination by the government cover sexual orientation and gender identity as well, and that as such, the government cannot enforce or introduce laws that discriminate on the basis of sexual orientation or gender identity.

However, the law does not address discrimination or harassment on account of sexual orientation or gender identity, nor does it recognize same-sex unions in any form, whether it be marriage or partnerships. Household headed by same-sex couples are not eligible for the same rights given to opposite-sex married couples.

== Legality of same-sex sexual activity ==
Recognition of same-sex unions in the Lesser Antilles and Puerto Rico Same-sex marriage Unregistered cohabitation Island subject to IACHR advisory opinion No recognition of same-sex couples Constitutional ban on same-sex marriage Same-sex sexual activity illegal but penalties not enforced

On 5 July 2022, the Eastern Caribbean Supreme Court ruled that sections of the Penal Code that made consensual same-sex intimacy illegal in Antigua and Barbuda were unconstitutional, and therefore void. This stemmed from the case Orden David et al v The Attorney General of Antigua and Barbuda.

Previously, two sections of the Sexual Offences Act 1995 criminalized same-sex sexual acts:

Section 12. (1) A person who commits buggery is guilty of an offence and is liable on conviction to imprisonment -

(a) for life, if committed by an adult on a minor;
(b) for fifteen years, if committed by an adult on another adult;
(c) for five years, if committed by a minor.

(2) In this section "buggery" means sexual intercourse per anum by a male person with a male person....

Section 15. (1) A person who commits an act of serious indecency on or towards another is guilty of an offence and is liable on conviction to imprisonment -

(a) for ten years, if committed on or towards a minor under sixteen years of age;
(b) for five years, if committed on or towards a person sixteen years of age of more....

* * * *

(3) An act of "serious indecency" is an act, other than sexual intercourse (whether natural or unnatural), by a person involving the use of the genital organ for the purpose of arousing or gratifying sexual desire.

"Repeat Offenders" of buggery also were placed on the Sex Offenders Register for the remainder of their life.

In May 2016, during the United Nations Human Rights Council's Universal Periodic Review, representatives from Argentina, Australia, France, Germany, the Netherlands and Nicaragua advised the Government to repeal the sodomy ban and guarantee full human rights to vulnerable groups such as the LGBTQ community. Minister of Social Transformation, Samantha Marshall, subsequently announced that the sodomy ban is antiquated and should be repealed. Parliamentary Secretary in the Ministry of Legal Affairs Maureen Payne-Hyman assured the Council that the LGBTQ community is not persecuted in the country.

On 24 August 2016, the Government of Antigua and Barbuda announced that it has no intentions of repealing the country's sodomy ban. The announcement came after the Belize Supreme Court struck down Belize's sodomy ban as unconstitutional. However, it acknowledged that, because Belize and Antigua and Barbuda have an identical jurisprudence, if an interest group filed a lawsuit against the law in court, then it would most certainly be declared unconstitutional. On 1 November 2019, the Eastern Caribbean Alliance for Diversity and Equality announced it planned to launch a legal challenge against the ban by the end of 2019.

== Discrimination protections ==
In its 5 July 2022 ruling striking down the nation's sodomy laws, the Eastern Caribbean Supreme Court found that Antigua and Barbuda's constitutional provision against discrimination based on sex also included a prohibition on discrimination based on sexual orientation and gender identity:

In giving a liberal and purposive interpretation to section 14(3) of the Constitution the reference to “sex” ought not to merely reference a physical gender. Such an approach would be too linear and restrictive. The reference to “sex” would necessarily encompass concepts such as gender identity, sexual character, and sexual orientation. It would be self-defeating to the constitutional provision if the notion of sex were to be separated from matters of sexual orientation and sexual identification since the concept of sex as a physical gender carries with it a perception of how people identify and are oriented even in those instances when the identification and orientation are stereotypical or traditional in nature.

== Public opinion ==
=== Gay people in public office ===
Acceptance of gay people in public office
Yes (%)	No (%)
21.5%	78.5%
Source: AmericasBarometer, 2016-2017

=== Same-sex marriage ===
Support for same-sex marriage
Yes (%)	No (%)
11.9%	88.1%
Source: AmericasBarometer, 2016-2017

== Summary table ==
Same-sex sexual activity legal	Yes (Since 2022)
Equal age of consent (16)	Yes (Since 2022)
Anti-discrimination laws in employment	Yes (Since 2022)
Anti-discrimination laws in the provision of goods and services	Yes (Since 2022)
Anti-discrimination laws in all other areas (Incl. indirect discrimination, hate speech)	Yes (Since 2022)
Same-sex marriages	No
Recognition of same-sex couples	No
Stepchild adoption by same-sex couples	No
Joint adoption by same-sex couples	No
LGBTQ people allowed to serve openly in the military	Yes (Since 2022)
Right to change legal gender	No
Access to IVF for lesbians	No
Commercial surrogacy for gay male couples	No
MSMs allowed to donate blood	No

== See also ==
- Politics of Antigua and Barbuda
- LGBTQ rights in the Commonwealth of Nations
- LGBTQ rights in the Americas
- LGBTQ rights by country or territory
