= Visa requirements for Antigua and Barbuda citizens =

Administrative entry restrictions

Visa requirements for Antiguan and Barbudan citizens are administrative entry restrictions imposed by the authorities of foreign states on citizens of Antigua and Barbuda. As of 15 April 2026, Antiguan and Barbudan citizens had visa-free or visa on arrival access (including eTAs) to 154 countries and territories, ranking the Antiguan and Barbudan passport 22nd in the world in terms of travel freedom (tied with the Trinidadian and Tobagonian passport) according to the Henley Passport Index.

== Visa requirements map ==
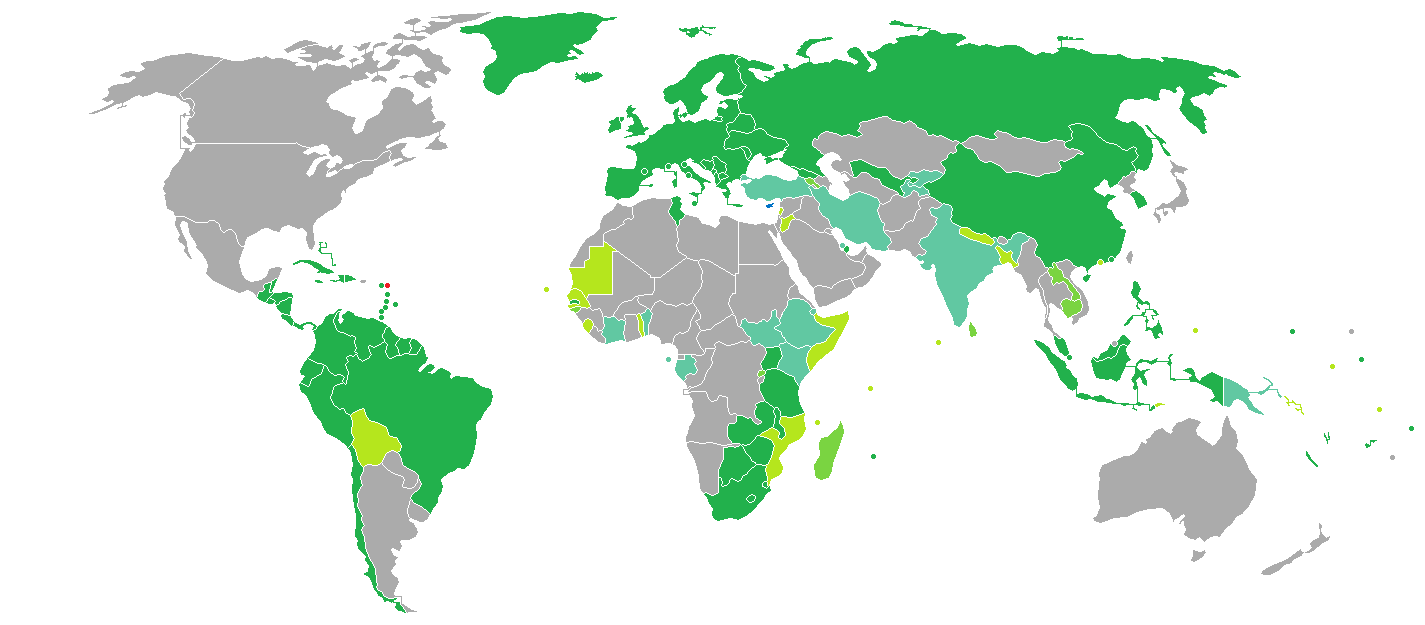
Visa requirements for Antigua and Barbuda citizens Antigua and Barbuda Visa free access Visa on arrival eVisa Visa available both on arrival or online Visa required

== Visa requirements ==
Country	Visa requirement	Allowed stay	Notes (excluding departure fees)
Afghanistan	Visa required		
Albania	Visa not required	90 days	
Algeria	Visa required		
Andorra	Visa not required	3 months	
Angola	Visa not required	30 days	
Argentina	Visa required		An Electronic Authorization (AVE or ETA) option is available for valid visa holders of the United States.
Armenia	eVisa / Visa on arrival	120 days	
Australia	Visa required		May apply online (Online Visitor e600 visa).
Austria	Visa not required	3 months	3 months during a 6 months period following the date of first entry in the Schengen Area
Azerbaijan	Visa required		
Bahamas	Visa not required	8 months	
Bahrain	eVisa	14 days	
Bangladesh	Visa on arrival		
Barbados	Visa not required	6 months	Holders of Caricom Certificate of Skills can stay indefinitely.
Belarus	Visa not required	30 days	Must arrive and depart via Minsk International Airport.
Belgium	Visa not required	3 months	3 months during a 6 months period following the date of first entry in the Schengen Area
Belize	Visa not required	6 months	Holders of Caricom Certificate of Skills can stay indefinitely.
Benin	eVisa	30 days	Must have an international vaccination certificate.
Bhutan	eVisa		Visa fee is 40 USD per person and visa application may be processed within 5 business days with duration of stay of 90 days.; e-Visa applicant is also subject to pay Sustainable Development Fee
Bolivia	eVisa / Visa on arrival	90 days	
Bosnia and Herzegovina	Visa not required	90 days	90 days within any 6-month period
Botswana	Visa not required	90 days	
Brazil	Visa not required	90 days	
Brunei	Visa required		
Bulgaria	Visa not required	3 months	3 months during a 6 months period following the date of first entry in the Schengen Area
Burkina Faso	eVisa		
Burundi	Visa on arrival		
Cambodia	eVisa / Visa on arrival	30 days	
Cameroon	eVisa		
Canada	Visa required		Citizens of Antigua and Barbuda who have held a Canadian visa in the last 10 years or who hold a valid United States non-immigrant visa can enter Canada solely with an eTA when arriving by air. A visitor visa is still required if arriving by land or sea.
Cape Verde	Visa not required		
Central African Republic	Visa required		
Chad	eVisa		
Chile	Visa not required	90 days	
China	Visa not required	30 days	Antigua and Barbuda and China sign Agreement of Mutual Visa Exemption on January 25, 2024, according to the agreement, a maximum of not more than 90 days within any 180-day period is allowed.
Colombia	Visa not required	90 days	90 days - extendable up to 180-days stay within a one-year period
Comoros	Visa on arrival		
Republic of the Congo	Visa required		
Democratic Republic of the Congo	eVisa	7 days	
Costa Rica	Visa not required	90 days	
Côte d'Ivoire	eVisa	3 months	eVisa holders must arrive via Port Bouet Airport.
Croatia	Visa not required	3 months	3 months during a 6 months period following the date of first entry in the Schengen Area
Cuba	Visa not required	30 days	
Cyprus	Visa not required	90 days	90 days within any 180 day period
Czech Republic	Visa not required	3 months	3 months during a 6 months period following the date of first entry in the Schengen Area
Denmark	Visa not required	3 months	3 months during a 6 months period following the date of first entry in the Schengen Area
Djibouti	Visa on arrival		
Dominica	Visa not required	Freedom of movement for OECS states; ID card valid	
Dominican Republic	Visa not required		
Ecuador	Visa not required	90 days	
Egypt	Visa on arrival	30 days	
El Salvador	Visa not required	90 days	
Equatorial Guinea	eVisa		
Eritrea	Visa required		
Estonia	Visa not required	3 months	3 months during a 6 months period following the date of first entry in the Schengen Area
Eswatini	Visa not required	30 days	
Ethiopia	eVisa	up to 90 days	eVisa holders must arrive via Addis Ababa Bole International Airport
Fiji	Visa not required	4 months	
Finland	Visa not required	3 months	3 months during a 6 months period following the date of first entry in the Schengen Area
France	Visa not required	3 months	3 months during a 6 months period following the date of first entry in the Schengen Area
Gabon	eVisa		Electronic visa holders must arrive via Libreville International Airport.
Gambia	Visa not required	90 days	
Georgia	Visa not required	1 year	
Germany	Visa not required	3 months	3 months during a 6 months period following the date of first entry in the Schengen Area
Ghana	Visa required		
Greece	Visa not required	3 months	3 months during a 6 months period following the date of first entry in the Schengen Area
Grenada	Visa not required	Freedom of movement for OECS states; ID card valid	
Guatemala	Visa not required	90 days	
Guinea	eVisa		
Guinea-Bissau	Visa on arrival	90 days	
Guyana	Visa not required	6 months	Holders of Caricom Certificate of Skills can stay indefinitely.
Haiti	Visa not required	3 months	
Honduras	Visa not required	90 days	
Hungary	Visa not required	3 months	3 months during a 6 months period following the date of first entry in the Schengen Area
Iceland	Visa not required	3 months	3 months during a 6 months period following the date of first entry in the Schengen Area
India	eVisa	60 days	e-Visa holders must arrive via 32 designated airports (Note: Ahmedabad; Amritsar; Bagdogra; Bengaluru; Bhubaneswar; Chandigarh; Chennai; Coimbatore; Delhi; Gaya; Goa-Dabolim; Goa-Manohar; Guwahati; Hyderabad; Indore; Jaipur; Kannur; Kochi; Kolkata; Kozhikode; Lucknow; Madurai; Mangaluru; Mumbai; Nagpur; Port Blair; Pune; Surat; Thiruvananthapuram; Tiruchirappalli; Varanasi; Visakhapatnam) or 5 designated seaports. (Note: Chennai; Cochin; Mormugao (Goa); Mumbai; Mangalore); An Indian e-Tourist Visa may only be obtained twice within 1 calendar year.; Foreigners of Pakistani origin or who hold a Pakistani Passport are not eligible for an e-Visa. Foreigners who are not Pakistani nationals, but whose parents or grandparents (either paternal or maternal) were born in, or were permanent residents in Pakistan, are also not eligible for an e-Visa.
Indonesia	Visa required		
Iran	eVisa / Visa on arrival	30 days	
Iraq	eVisa		
Ireland	Visa not required		
Israel	Visa required		
Italy	Visa not required	3 months	3 months during a 6 months period following the date of first entry in the Schengen Area
Jamaica	Visa not required	6 months	Holders of Caricom Certificate of Skills can stay indefinitely.
Japan	Visa required		Eligible for an e-Visa if residing in one these countries Australia, Brazil, Cambodia, Canada, India, Saudi Arabia, Singapore, South Africa, Taiwan, United Arab Emirates, United Kingdom, United States.; May apply online
Jordan	eVisa / Visa on arrival		
Kazakhstan	eVisa		
Kenya	Electronic Travel Authorisation	3 months	Applications can be submitted up to 90 days prior to travel and must be submitted at least 3 days in advance.; eTA fee is 32.50 USD.; Proof of reservation at the hotel where visitors plan to stay is required (if staying with friends, an invitation letter is also acceptable).; Yellow fever vaccination certificate is required if coming from endemic countries.
Kiribati	Visa not required	30 days	
North Korea	Visa required		
South Korea	Visa not required	90 days	
Kuwait	Visa required		e-Visa can be obtained for holders of a Residence Permit issued by a GCC member state under the following conditions: To be 18 years old and over.; The residence permit for a GCC state must be valid for at least another 3 months.; To be accompanied by the sponsor of the residence permit if the sponsor is an individual.; Does not apply to holders of a GCC Student Visa and Non-Skilled Worker Visa
Kyrgyzstan	eVisa		Electronic visa holders must arrive via Manas International Airport or Osh Airport or through land crossings with China (at Irkeshtam and Torugart), Kazakhstan (at Ak-jol, Ak-Tilek, Chaldybar, Chon-Kapka), Tajikistan (at Bor-Dobo, Kulundu, Kyzyl-Bel) and Uzbekistan (at Dostuk).
Laos	eVisa / Visa on arrival	30 days	18 (Note: Savannakhet Airport; Lanetoui - Mengkang (China); Meuangmom - Wan Pong (Myanmar); Banvang - Ban Khok Phai (Thailand); Namngeun - Huay Kon (Thailand); Paksan - Bueng Kan (Thailand); Paktaphan - Pak Saeng (Thailand); Pangmon - Ban Huak (Thailand); Phoudou (Thailand); Dak ta ock - Nam Giang (Vietnam); La Lai (Vietnam); Namkan (Vietnam); Namphao - Cau Treo (Vietnam); Namsoy - Na Meo (Vietnam); Naphao - Cha Lo (Vietnam); Pahang - Long Sap (Vietnam); Panghok - Tây Trang (Vietnam); Phoukeua - Bo Y (Vietnam)) of the 33 border crossings are only open to regular visa holders.; e-Visa may be used to enter Laos through the Luang Prabang, Pakse and Vientiane international airports, 3 Thai-Lao Friendship Bridges (Note: Vientiane (Friendship Bridge 1); Savannakhet (Friendship Bridge 2); Bokeo (Friendship Bridge 4)), in Boten (road and railroad), and in Vientiane (at Khamsavath railway station).; Visa on arrival is available at the Luang Prabang, Pakse and Vientiane international airports, 4 Thai-Lao Friendship Bridges (Note: Vientiane (Friendship Bridge 1); Savannakhet (Friendship Bridge 2); Khammouane (Friendship Bridge 3); Bokeo (Friendship Bridge 4)) and 7 border crossings. (Note: Nongnokkheane - Trapeang Kriel (Cambodia); Boten - Bo han (China); Golden Triangle/Samliemkham (Thailand); Khamsavath railway station (Thailand); Namheuang - Ban Na Kraseng (Thailand); Vang tao - Chongmek (Thailand); Dansavan - Lao Bảo (Vietnam))
Latvia	Visa not required	3 months	3 months during a 6 months period following the date of first entry in the Schengen Area
Lebanon	Visa on arrival	1 month	1 month extendable for 2 additional months; Granted free of charge at Beirut International Airport or any other port of entry if there is no Israeli visa or seal, holding a telephone number, an address in Lebanon, and a non refundable return or circle trip ticket.
Lesotho	Visa not required	30 days	
Liberia	eVisa		
Libya	eVisa		
Liechtenstein	Visa not required	3 months	3 months during a 6 months period following the date of first entry in the Schengen Area
Lithuania	Visa not required	3 months	3 months during a 6 months period following the date of first entry in the Schengen Area
Luxembourg	Visa not required	3 months	3 months during a 6 months period following the date of first entry in the Schengen Area
Madagascar	eVisa / Visa on arrival	90 days	
Malawi	Visa not required	90 days	
Malaysia	Visa not required	30 days	
Maldives	Visa on arrival	30 days	
Mali	Visa required		
Malta	Visa not required	3 months	3 months during a 6 months period following the date of first entry in the Schengen Area
Marshall Islands	Visa required		
Mauritania	eVisa		
Mauritius	Visa not required	90 days	
Mexico	Visa required		Exempt holders of UK travel documents (blue or black)- holding a valid USA B1/B2 visa, UK C- visitor visa, Canadian visitor visa, Japanese visitor visa or Schengen C-visit visa stamped in a valid passport, provided that the visa is to be issued for multiple entries and continues to be valid during the intended period of stay in Mexico do not require a visa to travel to Mexico as non-lucrative visitors.
Micronesia	Visa not required	30 days	
Moldova	Visa not required	90 days	90 days within any 180 day period
Monaco	Visa not required		
Mongolia	eVisa	30 days	
Montenegro	Visa not required	90 days	
Morocco	Visa required		
Mozambique	eVisa / Visa on arrival	30 days	
Myanmar	Visa required		
Namibia	eVisa		
Nauru	Visa required		
Nepal	eVisa / Visa on arrival	30 days	
Netherlands	Visa not required	3 months	3 months during a 6 months period following the date of first entry in the Schengen Area
New Zealand	Visa required		Holders of an Australian Permanent Resident Visa or Resident Return Visa may be granted a New Zealand Resident Visa on arrival permitting indefinite stay (pursuant to the Trans-Tasman Travel Arrangement), subject to meeting character requirements and obtaining an Electronic Travel Authority prior to departure.
Nicaragua	Visa not required	90 days	
Niger	Visa required		
Nigeria	eVisa		
North Macedonia	Visa not required	90 days	
Norway	Visa not required	3 months	3 months during a 6 months period following the date of first entry in the Schengen Area
Oman	Visa required		
Pakistan	eVisa		Online Visa eligible.; Electronic Travel Authorization to obtain a visa on arrival for business purposes.
Palau	Visa on arrival	30 days	
Panama	Visa not required	3 months	
Papua New Guinea	Easy Visitor Permit	30 days	
Paraguay	Visa required		
Peru	Visa not required	180 days	
Philippines	Visa not required	30 days	
Poland	Visa not required	3 months	3 months during a 6 months period following the date of first entry in the Schengen Area
Portugal	Visa not required	3 months	3 months during a 6 months period following the date of first entry in the Schengen Area
Qatar	Visa not required	90 days	
Romania	Visa not required	3 months	3 months during a 6 months period following the date of first entry in the Schengen Area
Russia	Visa not required	90 days	90 days within any 180 day period
Rwanda	eVisa / Visa on arrival	30 days	
Saint Kitts and Nevis	Visa not required	Freedom of movement for OECS states; ID card valid	
Saint Lucia	Visa not required	Freedom of movement for OECS states; ID card valid	
Saint Vincent and the Grenadines	Visa not required	Freedom of movement for OECS states; ID card valid	
Samoa	Entry Permit on arrival	60 days	
San Marino	Visa not required		
São Tomé and Príncipe	eVisa		
Saudi Arabia	Visa required		Tourist visa on arrival for holders of a valid multiple entry visa from US, UK or Schengen area, under the condition that the multiple entry visa has been used at least once, proving that by showing the entry and exit stamps of the country of issuance.
Senegal	Visa on arrival		
Serbia	Visa not required	90 days	90 days within any 180 day period
Seychelles	Visitor's Permit on arrival	3 months	
Sierra Leone	eVisa / Visa on arrival		
Singapore	Visa not required	30 days	
Slovakia	Visa not required	3 months	3 months during a 6 months period following the date of first entry in the Schengen Area
Slovenia	Visa not required	3 months	3 months during a 6 months period following the date of first entry in the Schengen Area
Solomon Islands	Permit on arrival	30 days	
Somalia	eVisa	30 days	
South Africa	Visa not required	30 days	
South Sudan	eVisa		Obtainable online; Printed visa authorization must be presented at the time of travel
Spain	Visa not required	3 months	3 months during a 6 months period following the date of first entry in the Schengen Area
Sri Lanka	ETA / Visa on arrival	30 days	The standard visitor visa allows a stay of 60 days within any 6-month period.; Visa fees (for Standard visitor visa): SAARC - USD 35; Non SAARC - USD 75; e-Visa categories will be charged an additional USD 18.50 service fee.; If transiting from any of the Sri Lankan airports, An e-Visa is exempted (2 day transit period).
Sudan	Visa required		
Suriname	Visa not required	6 months	Holders of Caricom Certificate of Skills can stay indefinitely.
Sweden	Visa not required	3 months	3 months during a 6 months period following the date of first entry in the Schengen Area
Switzerland	Visa not required	3 months	3 months during a 6 months period following the date of first entry in the Schengen Area
Syria	eVisa		
Tajikistan	eVisa	45 days	
Tanzania	Visa not required	3 months	
Thailand	eVisa		
Timor-Leste	Visa on arrival	30 days	
Togo	eVisa	15 days	
Tonga	Visa required		
Trinidad and Tobago	Visa not required	6 months	Holders of Caricom Certificate of Skills can stay indefinitely.
Tunisia	Visa not required	90 days	
Turkey	eVisa	30 days	
Turkmenistan	Visa required		
Tuvalu	Visa on arrival	1 month	
Uganda	Visa not required	90 days	
Ukraine	Visa not required	90 days	90 days within any 180 day period
United Arab Emirates	eVisa		
United Kingdom	Electronic Travel Authorisation	6 months	
United States	Visa required		
Uruguay	Visa required		
Uzbekistan	Visa not required	30 days	
Vanuatu	Visa not required	30 days	
Vatican City	Visa not required		
Venezuela	Visa not required	90 days	
Vietnam	eVisa	90 days	Visa free for 30 days when visiting Phú Quốc
Yemen	Visa required		
Zambia	Visa not required	90 days	
Zimbabwe	Visa not required	3 months	

== Dependent, Disputed, or Restricted territories ==
Unrecognized or partially recognized countries

Territory	Conditions of access	Notes
Abkhazia	Visa required	
Kosovo	Visa not required	90 days
Northern Cyprus	Visa not required	
Palestine	Visa not required	Arrival by sea to Gaza Strip not allowed.
Sahrawi Arab Democratic Republic		Undefined visa regime in the Western Sahara controlled territory.
Somaliland	Visa on arrival	30 days for 30 US dollars, payable on arrival.
South Ossetia	Visa not required	Multiple entry visa to Russia and three day prior notification are required to enter South Ossetia.
Taiwan	Visa required	
Transnistria	Visa not required	Registration required after 24h.

Dependent and autonomous territories

Territory	Conditions of access	Notes
China
Hong Kong	Visa not required	90 days
Macau	Visa on arrival	
Denmark
Faroe Islands	Visa not required	
Greenland	Visa not required	
France
French Guiana	Visa not required	
French Polynesia	Visa not required	
(France) French West Indies	Visa not required	Includes overseas departments of Guadeloupe and Martinique and overseas collectivities of Saint Barthélemy and Saint Martin.
Mayotte	Visa not required	
New Caledonia	Visa not required	
Réunion	Visa not required	
Saint Pierre and Miquelon	Visa not required	
Wallis and Futuna	Visa not required	
Netherlands
Aruba	Visa not required	
Caribbean Netherlands	Visa not required	Includes Bonaire, Sint Eustatius and Saba.
Curaçao	Visa not required	
Sint Maarten	Visa not required	
New Zealand
Cook Islands	Visa not required	31 days
Niue	Visa not required	30 days
Tokelau	Visa required	
United Kingdom
Akrotiri and Dhekelia	Visa not required	Stays longer than 28 days per 12-month period require a permit.
Anguilla	Visa not required	Holders of a valid visa issued by the United Kingdom do not require a visa.
Bermuda	Visa not required	
British Indian Ocean Territory	Special permit required	Special permit required.
British Virgin Islands	Visa not required	
Cayman Islands	Visa not required	
Falkland Islands	Visa required	
Gibraltar	Visa not required	
Montserrat	Visa not required	
Pitcairn Islands	Visa not required	14 days visa free and landing fee 35 USD or tax of 5 USD if not going ashore.
Ascension Island	eVisa	3 months within any year period
Saint Helena	Visitor's Pass required	Visitor's Pass granted on arrival valid for 4/10/21/60/90 days for 12/14/16/20/25 pound sterling.
Tristan da Cunha	Permission required	Permission to land required for 15/30 pounds sterling (yacht/ship passenger) for Tristan da Cunha Island or 20 pounds sterling for Gough Island, Inaccessible Island or Nightingale Islands.
South Georgia and the South Sandwich Islands	Permit required	Pre-arrival permit from the Commissioner required (72 hours/1 month for 110/160 pounds sterling).
Turks and Caicos Islands	Visa not required	Holders of a valid visa issued by Canada, United Kingdom or the USA do not required a visa for a maximum stay of 90 days.
United States
American Samoa	Visa required	
Guam	Visa required	
Northern Mariana Islands	Visa required	
Puerto Rico	Visa required	
U.S. Virgin Islands	Visa required	
Antarctica and adjacent islands
Special permits required for Bouvet Island, British Antarctic Territory, French Southern and Antarctic Lands, Argentine Antarctica, (Australia) Australian Antarctic Territory, (Antártica Chilena Province) Chilean Antarctic Territory, (Australia) Heard Island and McDonald Islands, (Norway) Peter I Island, (Norway) Queen Maud Land, (New Zealand) Ross Dependency.

== Additional Rules ==
=== Visa exemption for Schengen States ===
Citizens of Antigua and Barbuda are classified as 'Annex II' foreign nationals, and so are permitted to stay visa-free in the 26 member states of the Schengen Area as a whole — rather than each country individually — for a period not exceeding 3 months every 6 months.

=== Visa exemption in CARICOM States ===
Citizens of Antigua and Barbuda wishing to live and work in another CARICOM State should obtain a CSME Skills Certificate. This must be presented at Immigration in the receiving country along with a valid passport and a police certificate of character. Holders of certificates are given a maximum of six (6) months stay in the host country until their status and documents could be verified. Additional documents are required if travelling with spouse and/or dependants such as Marriage certificate, Birth Certificate, etc.

=== Visa exemption in OECS States ===
Citizens of Antigua and Barbuda can live and work in Dominica, Grenada, Saint Lucia, Saint Kitts and Nevis and Saint Vincent and the Grenadines as a result of right of freedom of movement granted in Article 12 of the Protocol of the Eastern Caribbean Economic Union of the Revised Treaty of Basseterre.

=== Visa exemption and requirements for the United Kingdom ===
Citizens of Antigua and Barbuda are able to visit the United Kingdom for up to 6 months (or 3 months if they enter from Ireland) without the need to apply for a visa as long as they fulfil all of the following criteria:

- they do not work during their stay in the UK
- they must not register a marriage or register a civil partnership during their stay in the UK
- they can present evidence of sufficient money to fund their stay in the UK (if requested by the border inspection officer)
- they intend to leave the UK at the end of their visit and can meet the cost of the return/onward journey
- they have completed a landing card and submitted it at passport control unless in direct transit to a destination outside the Common Travel Area
- if under the age of 18, they can demonstrate evidence of suitable care arrangements and parental (or guardian's) consent for their stay in the UK

However, even though, strictly speaking, he/she is not required to apply for a visa if he/she satisfies all of the above criteria, a Citizen of Antigua and Barbuda who falls into any of the following categories has been strongly advised by the UK Border Agency (replaced by UK Visas and Immigration) to apply for a visa prior to travelling to the UK:

- he/she has any unspent criminal convictions in any country
- he/she has previously been refused or breached the terms of any entry to the UK, or been deported or otherwise removed from the UK
- he/she has previously applied for a visa and been refused one
- he/she has been warned by a British official that he/she should obtain a visa before travelling to the UK

Citizens of Antigua and Barbuda with a grandparent born either in the United Kingdom, Channel Islands or Isle of Man at any time or in Ireland on or before 31 March 1922 can apply for UK Ancestry Entry Clearance, which enables them to work in the UK for 5 years, after which they can apply to settle indefinitely.

== Consular protection of Antiguan and Barbudan Citizens abroad ==
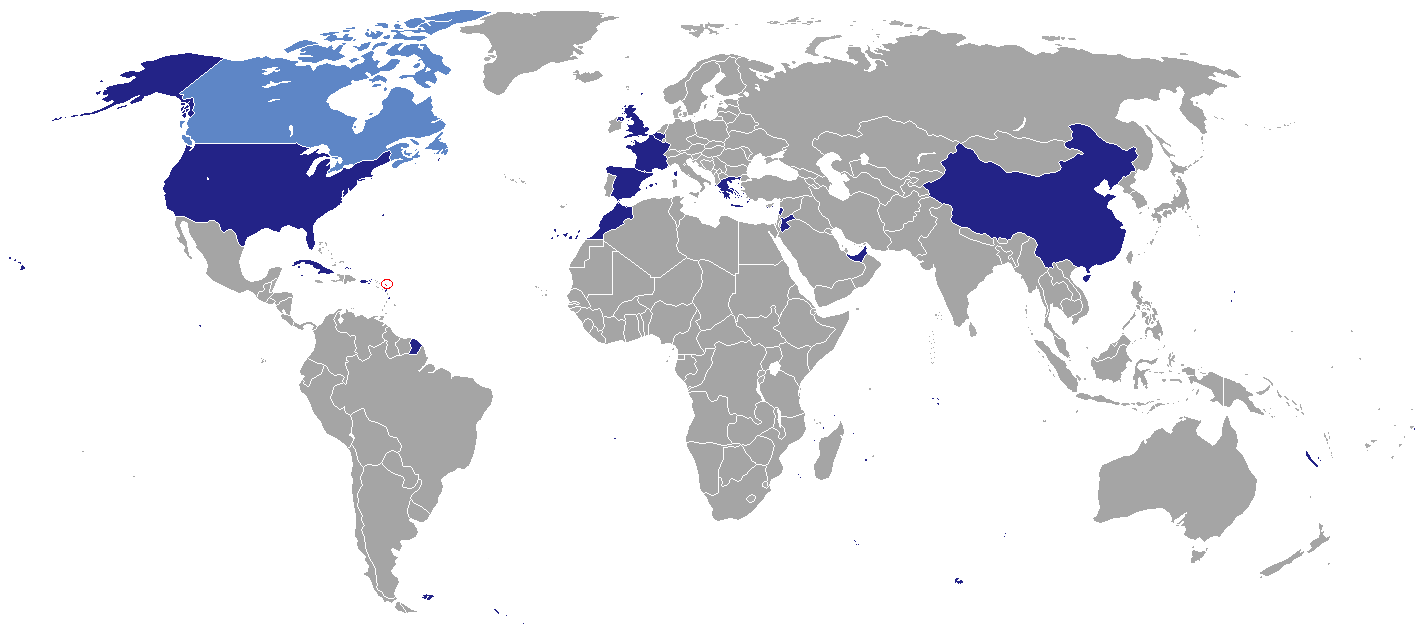
Diplomatic missions of Antigua and Barbuda

Citizens of Antigua and Barbuda who require consular assistance in a foreign country where there is no Antiguan and Barbudan foreign mission may be able to request assistance from a British Embassy, high commission or consulate. For example, Antiguan and Barbudans who need to travel urgently and whose passport has expired, been lost or stolen can be issued with an emergency travel document by a British foreign mission as long as this has cleared with the Ministry of Foreign Affairs of Antigua and Barbuda. See List of diplomatic missions of Antigua and Barbuda.

== Non-visa restrictions ==
=== Blank passport pages ===
Many countries require a minimum number of blank pages to be available in the passport being presented, typically one or two pages. Endorsement pages, which often appear after the visa pages, are not counted as being valid or available.

=== Vaccination ===
Cover of the new International Certificate of Vaccination issued by the Bureau of Quarantine in the Philippines since 2021

The African countries of Angola, Benin, Burkina Faso, Burundi, Cameroon, Central African Republic, Democratic Republic of the Congo, Republic of the Congo, Côte d'Ivoire, Gabon, Ghana, Guinea-Bissau, Mali, Niger, Sierra Leone and Togo, South Sudan and Uganda, along with French Guiana in South America, require all incoming passengers older than nine months to one year, to have a current International Certificate of Vaccination or Prophylaxis.

Some other countries require vaccination only if the passenger is coming from an infected area or has visited one recently or has transited for 12 hours in those countries: Algeria, Botswana, Cabo Verde, Chad, Djibouti, Egypt, Eswatini, Ethiopia, Gambia, Ghana, Guinea, Lesotho, Libya, Equatorial Guinea, Eritrea, Madagascar, Malawi, Mauritania, Mauritius, Mozambique, Namibia, Nigeria, Papua New Guinea, Seychelles, Somalia, South Africa, Sudan, Tunisia, Uganda, Tanzania, Zambia and Zimbabwe.

=== Passport validity length ===
Very few countries, such as Paraguay, just require a valid passport on arrival.

However many countries and groupings now require only an identity card – especially from their neighbours. Other countries may have special bilateral arrangements that depart from the generality of their passport validity length policies to shorten the period of passport validity required for each other's citizens or even accept passports that have already expired (but not been cancelled).

Some countries, such as Japan, Ireland and the United Kingdom, require a passport valid throughout the period of the intended stay.

In the absence of specific bilateral agreements, countries requiring passports to be valid for at least 6 more months on arrival include Afghanistan, Algeria, Anguilla, Bahrain, Bhutan, Botswana, British Virgin Islands, Brunei, Cambodia, Cameroon, Cape Verde, Cayman Islands, Central African Republic, Chad, Comoros, Costa Rica, Côte d'Ivoire, Curaçao, Ecuador, Egypt, El Salvador, Equatorial Guinea, Fiji, Gabon, Guinea Bissau, Guyana, Haiti, India, Indonesia, Iran, Iraq, Israel, Jordan, Kenya, Kiribati, Kuwait, Laos, Madagascar, Malaysia, Marshall Islands, Mongolia, Myanmar, Namibia, Nepal, Nicaragua, Nigeria, Oman, Palau, Papua New Guinea, Peru, Philippines, Qatar, Rwanda, Samoa, Saudi Arabia, Singapore, Solomon Islands, Somalia, Sri Lanka, Sudan, Suriname, Tanzania, Thailand, Timor-Leste, Tokelau, Tonga, Turkey, Tuvalu, Uganda, United Arab Emirates, Vanuatu, Venezuela, and Vietnam.

Countries requiring passports valid for at least 4 months on arrival include Micronesia and Zambia.

Countries requiring passports with a validity of at least 3 months beyond the date of intended departure include Azerbaijan, Bosnia and Herzegovina, Honduras, Montenegro, Nauru, Moldova and New Zealand. Similarly, the EEA countries of Iceland, Liechtenstein, Norway, all European Union countries (except Ireland) together with Switzerland also require 3 months validity beyond the date of the bearer's intended departure unless the bearer is an EEA or Swiss national.

Countries requiring passports valid for at least 3 months on arrival include Albania, North Macedonia, Panama, and Senegal.

Bermuda requires passports to be valid for at least 45 days upon entry.

Countries that require a passport validity of at least one month beyond the date of intended departure include Eritrea, Hong Kong, Lebanon, Macau, the Maldives and South Africa.

==== Maximum passport age ====
Countries of the Schengen area require non-EU passports to be less than 10 years old upon entry.

=== Criminal record ===
Some countries, including Australia, Canada, Fiji, New Zealand and the United States, routinely deny entry to non-citizens who have a criminal record, while others impose restrictions depending on the type of conviction and the length of the sentence.

=== Persona non grata ===
The government of a country can declare a diplomat persona non grata, banning them from entering the country or expelling them if they have already entered. In non-diplomatic use, the authorities of a country may also declare a foreigner persona non grata permanently or temporarily, usually because of unlawful activity.

=== Israeli stamps ===
Kuwait, Lebanon, Libya, and Yemen do not allow entry to people with passport stamps from Israel or whose passports have either a used or an unused Israeli visa, or where there is evidence of previous travel to Israel such as entry or exit stamps from neighbouring border posts in transit countries such as Jordan and Egypt.

To circumvent this Arab League boycott of Israel, the Israeli immigration services have now mostly ceased to stamp foreign nationals' passports on either entry to or exit from Israel (unless the entry is for some work-related purposes). Since 15 January 2013, Israel no longer stamps foreign passports at Ben Gurion Airport. Passports are still (as of 22 June 2017) stamped at Erez when passing into and out of Gaza.

Iran refuses admission to holders of passports containing an Israeli visa or stamp that is less than 12 months old.

=== Biometrics ===
Several countries mandate that all travellers, or all foreign travellers, be fingerprinted on arrival and will refuse admission to or even arrest travellers who refuse to comply. In some countries, such as the United States, this may apply even to transit passengers who merely wish to change planes rather than go landside.

Fingerprinting countries/regions include Afghanistan, Argentina, Brunei, Cambodia, China, Ethiopia, Ghana, Guinea, India, Japan, Kenya (both fingerprints and a photo are taken), Malaysia upon entry and departure, Mongolia, Saudi Arabia, the Schengen Area, Singapore, South Korea, Taiwan, Thailand, Uganda, the United Arab Emirates and the United States.

Many countries also require a photo be taken of people entering the country. The United States, which does not fully implement exit control formalities at its land frontiers (although long mandated by its own legislation), intends to implement facial recognition for passengers departing from international airports to identify people who overstay their visa.

Together with fingerprint and face recognition, iris scanning is one of three biometric identification technologies internationally standardised since 2006 by the International Civil Aviation Organization (ICAO) for use in e-passports and the United Arab Emirates conducts iris scanning on visitors who need to apply for a visa. The United States Department of Homeland Security has announced plans to greatly increase the biometric data it collects at US borders. In 2018, Singapore began trials of iris scanning at three land and maritime immigration checkpoints.

== See also ==
- Visa policy of Antigua and Barbuda
- Antigua and Barbuda passport
