= Visa policy of Antigua and Barbuda =

Policy on permits required to enter Antigua and Barbuda

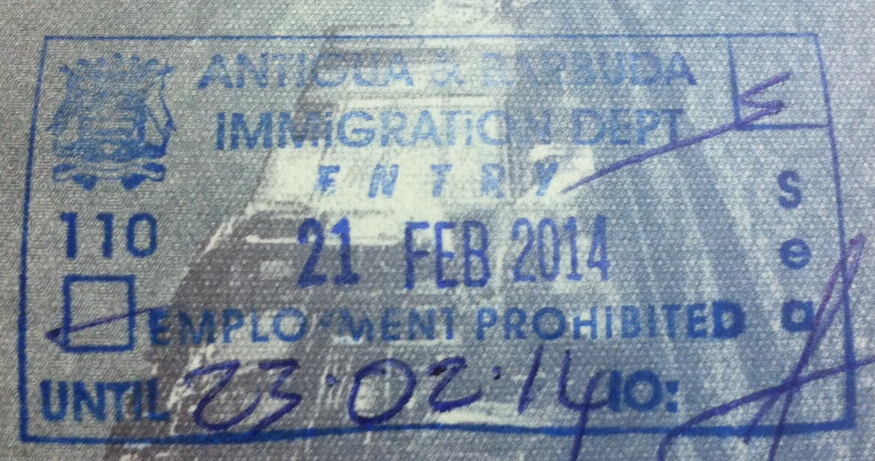
Entry stamp

Visitors to Antigua and Barbuda must obtain an Electronic Entry Visa (EEV) unless they are citizens from one of the visa-exempt countries.

== Visa policy map ==
Visa policy of Antigua and Barbuda Antigua and Barbuda Freedom of movement Visa not required (180 days) Visa not required (30 days) Electronic Entry Visa (EEV)

== Visa exemption ==
=== Ordinary passports ===
Citizens of the following countries may enter and Barbuda without a visa for the following period:

Freedom of movement

- Dominica
- Grenada
- Saint Kitts and Nevis
- Saint Lucia
- Saint Vincent and the Grenadines

180 days

- All European Union member states

- Albania
- Andorra
- Argentina
- Armenia
- Australia
- Azerbaijan
- Bahamas
- Barbados
- Belarus
- Belize
- Botswana
- Brazil
- Brunei
- Canada
- Chile
- Colombia
- Eswatini
- Fiji
- Georgia
- Guyana
- Iceland
- Jamaica
- Japan
- Kazakhstan
- Kenya
- Kiribati
- Kyrgyzstan
- Lesotho
- Liechtenstein
- Malawi
- Malaysia
- Maldives
- Marshall Islands
- Mauritius
- Mexico
- Moldova
- Monaco
- Namibia
- Nauru
- New Zealand
- Norway
- Panama
- Papua New Guinea
- Peru
- Russia
- Samoa
- San Marino
- Serbia
- Seychelles
- Singapore
- Solomon Islands
- South Africa
- South Korea
- Suriname
- Switzerland
- Tajikistan
- Tanzania
- Trinidad and Tobago
- Turkey
- Turkmenistan
- Tuvalu
- Uganda
- Ukraine
- United Arab Emirates
- United Kingdom
- United States
- Uzbekistan
- Vanuatu
- Vatican City
- Venezuela
- Zambia

30 days

- China
- Cuba
- Hong Kong
- Macau
- Taiwan

Date of visa changes
- 6 November 1996: Russia
- 25 September 2008: Cyprus, Czech Republic, Estonia, Latvia, Lithuania, Slovakia
- 2014: China
- 2016: United Arab Emirates
- 2018: Colombia
- 2023: Serbia

Cruise ship visitors do not require a visa provided that they arrive in Antigua and Barbuda in the morning and depart the same evening.

=== Non-ordinary passports ===
In addition to countries whose citizens are visa-exempt, holders of diplomatic or official passports of Haiti may enter Antigua and Barbuda without a visa.

Holders of a Laissez-Passer issued by the United Nations and the Caribbean Community (CARICOM) traveling on duty may enter Antigua and Barbuda without a visa.

=== Future changes ===
Antigua and Barbuda has signed visa exemption agreements with the following countries, but they have not yet been ratified:

Country	Passports	Agreement signed on
Rwanda	All	17 July 2025
Indonesia	All	27 August 2021

== Visa on arrival ==
=== Substitute visa ===
Holders of a valid visa or permanent residence permit issued by any Schengen Area member state, Canada, the United Kingdom or the United States may obtain a visa on arrival for a maximum stay of 30 days.

== Electronic visa (e-Visa) ==
Citizens of other countries must obtain an Electronic Entry Visa (EEV). Biometrics, if required, will be taken on arrival.

== Visitor statistics ==
Most visitors arriving to Antigua and Barbuda as tourists are from the following countries of nationality: This does not include numbers of tourists disembarking as part of a cruise.

Country	2023	2022	2021	2020	2019	2018	2017	2016	2015	2014	2013
United States	137,157	129,521	102,495	60,319	123,553	104,103	96,347	108,652	94,617	95,332	88,619
United Kingdom	68,278	79,900	48,328	31,765	76,837	70,607	70,701	76,512	77,890	71,193	68,854
Canada	28,775	17,611	4,055	15,716	37,225	38,087	22,932	21,196	23,270	27,701	30,235
Italy	2,584	2,343	598	2,249	9,735	6,832	8,527	8,600	7,032	7,976	7,942
Trinidad and Tobago							4,250	3,768	3,331	3,546	3,746
Dominica							4,153	3,988	3,728	2,913	2,954
Jamaica							3,876	3,932	3,857	3,543	3,273
Barbados							2,863	2,878	2,916	2,934	2,920
Saint Kitts and Nevis							2,213	2,651	2,175	2,490	2,741
Germany	1,061	776	377	718	2,125	2,216	2,120	2,165	2,505	2,665	2,443
Total	281,896	265,119	169,469	125,083	300,990	268,949	247,320	265,187	250,450	249,316	243,219

== See also ==
- Visa requirements for Antigua and Barbuda citizens
