= Antigua and Barbuda High Court =

High Court of Justice in Antigua and Barbuda
- Interactive map of High Court of Justice in Antigua and Barbuda
- 17°7′13″N 61°50′7″W
- Established: 27 February 1967
- Jurisdiction: Antigua and Barbuda
- Location: Parliament Drive, St. John's, Antigua and Barbuda
- Coordinates: 17°7′13″N 61°50′7″W
- Appeals from: Magistrates' courts

Certain justices of the High Court of Justice of the Eastern Caribbean Supreme Court (ECSC) are assigned to hear cases from Antigua and Barbuda. Officially, the division of this court in Antigua and Barbuda is called the High Court of Justice in Antigua and Barbuda, however, the Antigua and Barbuda High Court (ABHC) is an acceptable and more common term.

The ABHC was constituted in its present form in the Antigua and Barbuda Constitution Order of 1981. It is regulated under chapter IX, that grants the court the ability to hear cases relating to constitutional law, as well as the ability to hear appeals from the magistrates' courts. In chapter IX, decisions of the ABHC may be appealed to the Court of Appeal in the ECSC.

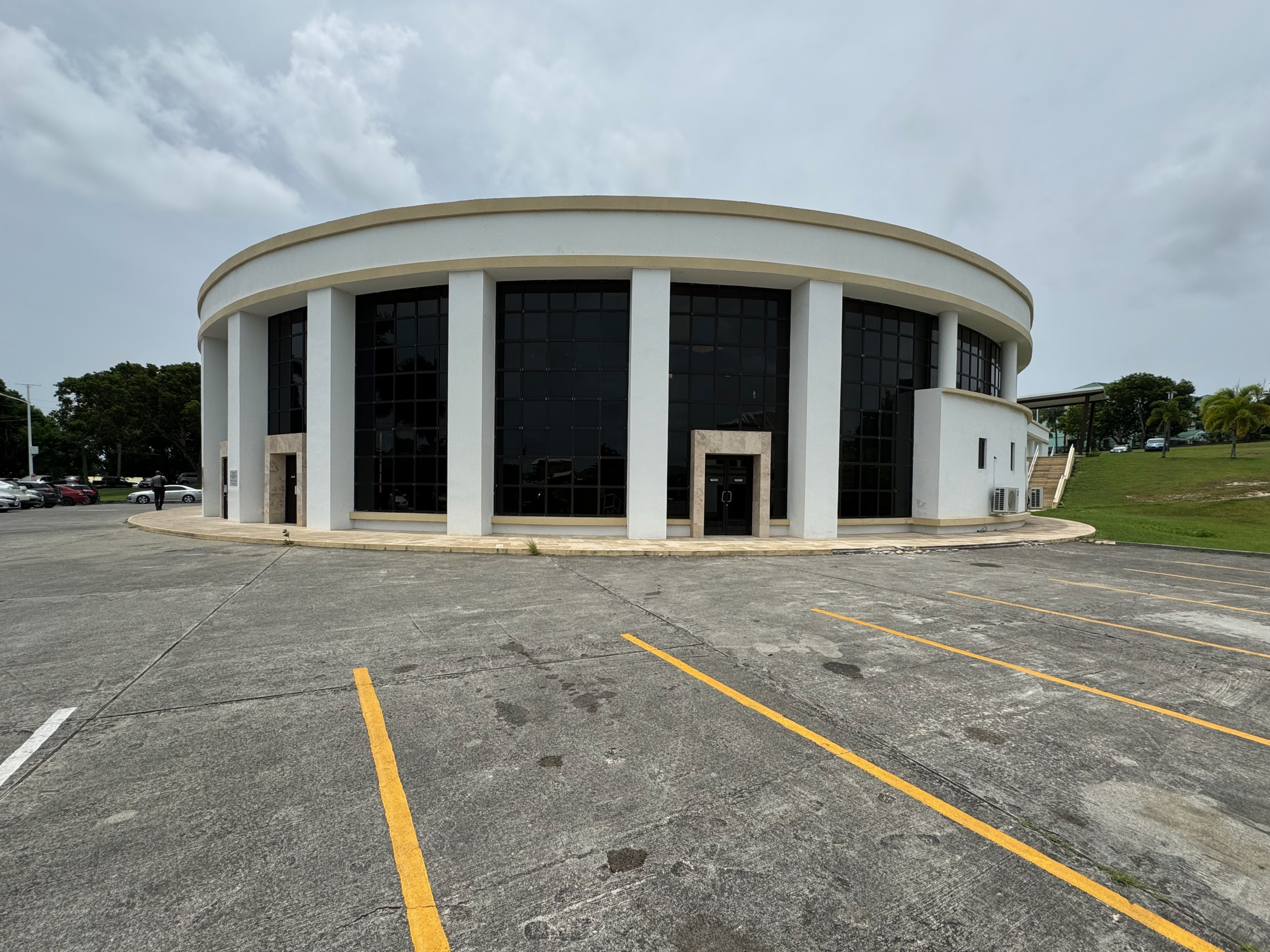
Front view of the court building in July 2024

== Composition ==
The justices of the high court for Antigua and Barbuda are assigned to the country by the Judicial and Legal Services Commission (JLSC) of the OECS. Justices of the High Court must retire at the sixty-five, however, the JLSC may extend a justice's term by three years upon the agreement of the heads of government of all of the states participating in the ECSC. The justices of the ABHC were also the justices of the Court of Summary Jurisdiction, before it was abolished in 1994.

== Jurisdiction and functioning of the court ==
Any person in Antigua and Barbuda may bring a case to the High Court if they believe the Constitution is being or has been contravened. If the Constitution is being violated, the High Court may grant the victim a remedy deemed appropriate by the court. If a question of the interpretation of the Constitution of Antigua and Barbuda is made, and a subordinate court believes that a ruling would have a significant impact on the law, that court may refer the question to the High Court. Decisions of the High Court may be appealed to the Court of Appeal of the ECSC, and further to the Judicial Committee of the Privy Council. In the Eastern Caribbean Supreme Court Act, it is stated that the High Court shall have the same jurisdiction as the High Court of Justice in England did in 1940. The court hears appeals from the magistrates' courts.

Each High Court division in the ECSC has a High Court Registry for that member state. In Antigua and Barbuda, the registrar performs the functions required for the conduct and discharge of the court, and is ex officio an admiralty marshal, a provost marshal, and has custody of the seal of the High Court as well custody of the seal of the sub-registry of the ECSC Court of Appeal in Antigua and Barbuda.

== Membership ==
As of December 2024, there are currently five justices on the High Court in Antigua and Barbuda.

| Justice | Start date | Source |
|---|---|---|
| Nicola Petra Byer | 15 July 2022 | |
| Ann-Marie Smith | 1 January 2020 | |
| Jan Drysdale | 12 April 2021 | |
| Rene Williams | 1 May 2023 | |
| Tunde Ademola Bakre (acting) | 1 October 2023 | |

== See also ==
- Judiciary of Antigua and Barbuda
- Caribbean Court of Justice
