= Judiciary of Antigua and Barbuda =

The judiciary of Antigua and Barbuda is an independent branch of the Antiguan and Barbudan government, subject to the Constitution of Antigua and Barbuda. Even though the Office of the Attorney General in the executive branch appoints magistrates, the judicial branch is mostly independent of the other two branches. The Magistrate's Court handles minor offenses, while the High Court handles major ones, makes up the judiciary. A matter must be sent to the Court of Appeal in the Eastern Caribbean Supreme Court, whose members are chosen by the OECS, in order to move past the High Court. The heads of state in the OECS system must unanimously approve any appointments or removals of Supreme Court magistrates. The attorney general's advice is the basis for the prime minister of Antigua and Barbuda's decision-making on this court.

== Structure ==
The 19 High Court judges live in the nine member nations and sit in their respective country's court of summary jurisdiction. The chief justice and the four justices of appeal are situated at the court's headquarters in Saint Lucia. Magistrate courts hear less serious cases. The Court of Appeals travels around. Constitutional matters, as well as fundamental rights and liberties, fall under the High Court's purview.

The levels of the courts are as follows:

- The magistrates' courts
- The Supreme Court
  - High Court
  - Court of Appeal
    - Judicial Committee of the Privy Council

Chapter IX of the constitution of Antigua and Barbuda regulates the judicial provisions. Any person who asserts that any provision of the Constitution (other than a provision of Chapter II) has been or is being violated may, if they have a relevant interest, apply to the High Court for a declaration and for relief under section 119, subject to the provisions of sections 25(2), 47(8)(b), 56(4), 65(5), 124(7)(b), and 124 of the Constitution. On a request submitted pursuant to the section, the High Court shall have jurisdiction to ascertain whether any provision of the Constitution (other than a provision of Chapter II) has been or is being violated and to issue a declaration in that regard. When the High Court declares that a constitutional provision has been violated or is being violated under the section and the person on whose application the declaration was made has also asked for relief, the High Court may grant that person whatever remedy it deems appropriate, provided that remedy is one that is generally available under any law in proceedings in the High Court. Regarding the practice and procedure of the High Court in relation to the jurisdiction and powers granted to the court by or under the section, the Chief Justice may make provisions or authorise the making of provisions, including provisions regarding the time within which any application under the section may be made. Only if the claimed violation of the Constitution has the potential to negatively impact the applicant's interests will that person be considered to have a relevant interest for the purposes of an application under the section. The ability to apply for a declaration and relief in relation to an alleged violation of the Constitution is granted to a person by the section, in addition to any other actions that person may be allowed to take regarding the same matter under any other statute or rule of law. Nothing in the section grants the High Court the authority to hear or decide any of the questions mentioned in the Constitution's Section 44.

When a constitutional interpretation issue arises in a court of law in Antigua and Barbuda (other than the Court of Appeal, the High Court, or a court-martial), and the court determines that the issue involves a significant legal issue, the court may, and will, refer the issue to the High Court if a party to the proceedings requests it. In the event that a matter is referred to the High Court pursuant to section 120, the High Court shall render a decision on the matter, and the court where the matter originally arose shall decide the case in accordance with that decision or, in the event that the decision is the subject of an appeal to the Court of Appeal or Privy Council, in accordance with the decision of the Court of Appeal or, as applicable, the Privy Council.

== Magistrates' Court ==
There are three magistrates' courts in Antigua and Barbuda.

- District "A" (Saint John)
- District "B" (Saint George, Saint Paul, Saint Philip, Saint Peter, Saint Mary)
- District "C" (Barbuda)

The Minister may occasionally set the boundaries of the various districts in Antigua and Barbuda. There will be as many magistrates working for the government as necessary. A district may receive one, several, or both Magistrates, depending on the Governor-General's discretion. Each Magistrate who is assigned to a district where there is more than one Magistrate must share concurrent jurisdiction over that district with the other Magistrate or Magistrates so assigned. Any magistrate assigned has jurisdiction over the entirety of Antigua & Barbuda. A magistrate shall have and exercise all the authority and perform all the duties that are currently held by or imposed upon magistrates or justices of the peace under common law or in accordance with any law that is currently in effect, or that may in the future be held by or imposed upon such magistrates under any such law. Every District Magistrate in Antigua and Barbuda shall also serve as a Justice of the Peace ex officio. A Justice of the Peace for Antigua and Barbuda may be appointed by the Governor-General by warrant under his hand, unless otherwise provided in any Act. In a similar manner, the Governor-General may remove any Justice of the Peace from his office for any reason that may appear to him sufficient.

Justices of the Peace must share full authority and jurisdiction with Magistrates in the issuance of summonses, warrants, and other court documents; in the setting of bail amounts; in the taking of recognizances; in the binding of parties and witnesses; and in the administration of oaths. As many clerks and bailiffs as may be needed for the purposes of this Act shall be employed by the public sector. Each district must have enough offices for convening Magistrate's Courts, which must be paid for out of the Consolidated Fund.

Every magistrate shall have the authority to receive complaints and information regarding all offenses and to cause all persons charged with such offenses to appear before him via summons or warrant; to issue search warrants as hereinafter provided; to investigate all allegations which he is not authorized to try summarily and to dismiss the accused or to commit him for trial before the High Court; any those charged with committing offenses that he is authorized by any Act to trial summarily, convict, and sentence; To issue orders for the maintenance, education, and burial of children born into the world without legal parents, as well as for the maintenance of wives who have been abandoned by their husbands; to issue all convictions, sentences, and orders under any Act he is authorized to issue; to issue orders that may initially be carried out and enforced by fine or imprisonment; to arbitrate salvage and wreckage title issues when the total value in controversy does not exceed $240; to try any civil action based on a contract when the debt, demand, value of the thing claimed, or unpaid rent does not exceed $1500; to try any civil action based on a tort when the demand or harm claimed does not exceed $1500 with the caveat that no lawsuits involving malicious prosecution, false imprisonment, libel, slander, seduction, or breach of a marriage commitment will fall under the Magistrate's purview.
