= Constitution of Antigua and Barbuda =

Supreme law of Antigua and Barbuda since 1981

Overview
- Jurisdiction: Antigua and Barbuda
- Created: 31 July 1981
- Date effective: 1 November 1981
- System: Parliamentary monarchy

Government structure
- Branches: Executive; Legislative; Judicial
- Head of state: King of Antigua and Barbuda
- Chambers: Senate; House of Representatives
- Executive: Prime minister-led cabinet responsible to the House of Representatives
- Judiciary: See Judiciary of Antigua and Barbuda
- Federalism: No
- Last amended: 2026
- Commissioned by: House of Representatives: 23 April 1981; Senate: 1 May 1981
- Supersedes: Constitution of the Associated State of Antigua

The Constitution of Antigua and Barbuda is the supreme law that governs the country. The Constitution lays out the legal foundation for the Antigua and Barbuda government as well as the rights and obligations of the general public and other public servants. In 1981, the Constitution went into effect. The Antigua Constitution and Elections Order, as well as the Constitution of the Associated State of Antigua, are among the texts pertaining to Antigua and Barbuda's governance that have been superseded by the 1981 document.

== Background and history ==
The Antigua Constitutional Conference took place from February 28, 1966 to March 25, 1966, when a consensus report was signed. The UK Parliament heard this report, which has been published as Cmnd. 2963. In general, the Conference decided that Britain and Antigua should form a new, free, voluntary association that either country could end at any time; Antigua should have complete autonomy over all internal affairs, with Britain handling defense and foreign affairs; the two governments would negotiate a plan outlining how Britain would carry out its defense and foreign affairs responsibilities; there would be extensive communication and significant delegation to the Antigua government in the area of external affairs. A consensus was also achieved over the elements that should be contained in a new Antiguan constitution; Cmnd. 2963 contains the specifics of this agreement.

In July 1980, a new draft constitution was debated in the Antiguan Parliament, later being presented to the public. From 4 to 16 December 1980, a second constitutional conference as held at the Lancaster House. The Antiguan and Barbudan delegation in the second conference was composed of thirty politicians, lawyers, and trade unionists. On 23 April 1981, a resolution approving the second conference's draft passed the House of Representatives. On 1 May 1981, the resolution passed the Senate.

In accordance with section 10(2) of the West Indies Act 1967, the Antigua Termination of Association Order 1981 terminated the association status between the United Kingdom and Antigua. Any order made under that section must be authorized by a resolution from each House of Parliament after being brought before Parliament in draft form. When Richard Luce laid the order before the UK Parliament, topics discussed were the possibility of an attempted rebellion in Barbuda similar to that of the Republic of Anguilla, and the disapproval of Barbudans joining the new state.

On 15 December 2025, an amendment to the constitution passed the House of Representatives, and on 17 December, the Senate. This amendment is intended to remove references to the monarch in the oath of allegiance. The amendment enjoyed bipartisan support and did not require a referendum under section 47(5). The amendment took effect on 1 January 2026.

== Provisions ==
=== Preamble ===
The preamble is part of the constitutional order.

=== Chapters ===
==== Chapter I ====
According to this chapter, Antigua and Barbuda is a unitary sovereign democratic state. Its territory consists of the islands of Antigua, Barbuda, and Redonda as well as all other areas that made up Antigua as of October 31, 1981, as well as any additional areas that may be added by act of the legislature. This chapter also establishes that the Constitution is the highest law of Antigua and Barbuda and that, subject to its provisions, if any other laws are in conflict with it, the conflicting laws shall be nullified to the extent that they do so.

==== Chapter II ====
The Protection of Fundamental Rights and Freedoms of the Individual is addressed in Chapter II. Everyone in Antigua and Barbuda is entitled to the fundamental freedoms and rights of the individual, i.e., the freedom to live as one chooses, without regard to race, national origin, political opinions or affiliations, color of skin, creed, or sexual orientation, but only in accordance with other people's rights and interests. No one's life may be purposefully taken unless it is done so in accordance with a court's ruling about a treason or murder offense for which they have been found guilty. Except as may be permitted by law, no one's personal liberty may be taken away. No one may be kept in a state of slavery or servitude. This chapter acts as Antigua and Barbuda's bill of rights.

==== Chapter III ====
This chapter regulates the office of Governor-General. The head of state may appoint a person to serve as the Governor-General of Antigua and Barbuda, who shall represent the head of state in Antigua and Barbuda and occupy office until His Majesty's pleasure. When the position of Governor-General is unoccupied, the incumbent is not present in Antigua and Barbuda, or he or she is otherwise unable to carry out the duties of the office, the head of state may designate another person to fill the vacancy. In this chapter, the position of Deputy Governor-General is also defined.

==== Chapter IV ====
In and for Antigua and Barbuda, this chapter establishes a Parliament that will be made up of His Majesty, a Senate, and a House of Representatives. The Senate must be made up of seventeen people who meet the requirements for appointment as senators under the terms of the Constitution and who have been so appointed under the terms of section 28, as well as any temporary members (if any) who may be appointed under the terms of section 32 of the Constitution. Prior to conducting any other business, the Senate must elect a senator to serve as president when it convenes following a general election. If the position of president becomes vacant at any point before the next dissolution of Parliament, the Senate must elect a new senator to serve in that capacity as soon as is practically possible.

The House is composed, subject to the provisions of section 36, of such number of elected members as may be prescribed by or under any Act of Parliament, subject to the provisions of the Constitution, be equal to the number of constituencies from time to time established by Order under Part 4 of this Chapter.

==== Chapter V ====
This chapter confirms that His Majesty is the executive authority of Antigua and Barbuda. The Governor-General may, directly or through persons reporting to him, exercise the executive authority of Antigua and Barbuda on behalf of His Majesty, subject to the provisions of this Constitution. This clause does not exclude Parliament from assigning duties to individuals or bodies other than the Governor-General. This chapter is significant since it specifies that the Governor-General will appoint the Prime Minister of Antigua and Barbuda.

==== Chapter VI ====
This chapter stipulates that all revenues and other funds raised or received by Antigua and Barbuda must be deposited into and form a Consolidated Fund. These funds cannot be used to pay into any other fund that has been established for a specific purpose or that is required by or under any current Antigua and Barbuda law. Importantly, it is established that no money may be taken out of the Consolidated Fund unless it is required to pay for expenses imposed on the Fund by the Constitution, a law passed by Parliament, or a law made in accordance with section 93 of the Constitution that authorizes the use of such funds.

==== Chapter VII ====
The Public Service Commission for Antigua and Barbuda is established by this chapter. It will have a chairman and two to six other members who will be appointed by the Governor-General, acting on the Prime Minister's advice. However, the Prime Minister will first confer with the leader of the Opposition before submitting any advice to the Governor-General for the purposes of this subsection.

==== Chapter VIII ====
The Antiguan and Barbudan nationality law is covered in this chapter. From November 1, 1981, onwards, an individual will only be considered a citizen of Antigua and Barbuda for the purposes of any legislation.

==== Chapter IX ====
This chapter states that anyone who claims that any provision of the Constitution (other than a Chapter II provision) has been or is being violated may, if he has a relevant interest, apply to the High Court for a declaration and for relief under this section, subject to the provisions of sections 25(2), 47(8)(b), 56(4), 65(5), 124(7)(b), and 124 of the Constitution.

==== Chapter X ====
The Barbuda Council, some matters not to be inquired into in any court, resignations, reappointments and concurrent appointments, and interpretations are all covered in this chapter on miscellaneous matters.
