= Antiguan and Barbudan nationality law =

Antiguan and Barbudan nationality law is regulated by the 1981 Constitution of Antigua and Barbuda, the various Antigua and Barbuda Citizenship Acts, the Millennium Naturalisation Act of 2004, and various British Nationality laws. These laws determine who is, or is eligible to be, a national of Antigua and Barbuda. Antiguan and Barbudan nationality is typically obtained either on the principle of jus soli, i.e. by birth in Antigua and Barbuda; or under the rules of jus sanguinis, i.e. by birth abroad to a parent with Antiguan or Barbudan nationality. It can also be granted to persons with an affiliation to the country, by investment in the country's development, or to a permanent resident who has lived in the country for a given period of time through naturalisation. Nationality establishes one's international identity as a member of a sovereign nation. Though it is not synonymous with citizenship, rights granted under domestic law for domestic purposes, the United Kingdom, and thus the commonwealth, has traditionally used the words interchangeably.

== Acquiring Antiguan and Barbudan nationality ==
Antiguan and Barbudans may acquire nationality through birth, naturalisation, or registration.

=== By birth ===
Birthright nationality applies to:

- Persons born within the territory, except those who are born to persons like foreign diplomats, who have immunity from legal processes, or to foreign parents whose country is at war with the Antiguan and Barbudan sovereign;
- Persons born abroad to at least one parent or grandparent, who acquired Antiguan and Barbudan nationality at the time of independence in 1981, or would have acquired such nationality had the parent not died prior to independence; or
- Persons born abroad to parents employed in service to the government or under the authority of the government.

=== By registration ===
Nationality by registration includes those who have familial or historic relationship affiliations with Antigua and Barbuda. It also includes a scheme to acquire nationality through investment. Persons who acquire can nationality by registration include:

==== By affiliation ====
- Persons who were the spouse or widow/er of a national who acquired nationality at the time of independence, if the marriage had endured for a minimum of three years, unless they were legally separated or living apart on 31 October 1981;
- Post-independence, the spouse of a national who has been married and living with a national of the territory for a minimum of three years;
- Persons who were Commonwealth citizens who established a permanent residency and had lived in Antigua for a minimum of seven years prior to 31 October 1981;
- Persons who are Commonwealth citizens who have become domiciled in Antigua and Barbuda post-Independence and resided in the territory for at least seven years;
- Persons who would have become a national at independence but were ineligible solely for having had to renounce British citizenship to acquire another nationality
- Minors under age eighteen who were legally adopted by a national or would have been eligible to be registered as an adoptee, while a minor, of a national had the parent not died;
- Foundlings born in the territory; or
- Persons who are in the employ of the government and meet specified tenure of residency and service.

==== By investment ====
Requirements for nationality by investment require payment of a contribution, which as of 2025 are $230,000 for a family of up to four individuals, as well as processing and due diligence fees. The primary applicant must be 18 years of age or older and must make a minimum investment by real estate purchase, contribution to the National Development Fund, or investment in a business in the country. Agents of the Citizenship by Investment Unit are responsible for processing applications. Applicants must pay the non-refundable due diligence fees and ten per cent of the application fee at the time of application, provide a certificate from a medical practitioner certifying good health and lack of communicable diseases for the applicant and any family members, and a police certificate. Successful applicants must take an Oath of Allegiance.

=== By naturalisation ===
Ordinary naturalisation in Antigua and Barbuda can be obtained by adult persons of legal capacity, who in the 12 months prior to submitting an application resided uninterruptedly in the territory as well as for five out of the seven years before that period, are of good character, and intend to be a resident of Antigua and Barbuda. Applicants petition the Minister for Immigration and Citizenship though the Chief Immigration Officer, who considers the risk the person may pose for public morality and safety, such as criminal acts or activities in or outside the country which might upset legal or public order; by an undischarged bankruptcy proceeding; or with an insufficient means of self-sustainability. Payment of fees is required, as are documents as needed to support the application. Upon approval, applicants must take an Oath of Allegiance.

== Loss of nationality ==
Nationals may voluntarily renounce their affiliation with Antigua and Barbuda, if the declarant is a legal adult and is able to acquire other nationality, eliminating the prospect of statelessness within twelve months. Renunciation may not be accepted if such action would jeopardise state interests or if Antigua and Barbuda is in a war with the proposed new source of nationality. Denaturalisation may occur if a person obtained nationality through fraud, false representation, or concealment; acts of treason; disloyalty or service to a foreign government; certain criminal offences; loss of nationality in a Commonwealth Country; and in the case of nationality by investment for failure to meet residency requirements of the program.

== Dual nationality ==
Antigua and Barbuda allows dual nationality, which was expressly provided for in the Constitution of 1981.

== History ==
=== Colonial period (1632-1981) ===
In Britain, allegiance, in which subjects pledged to support a monarch, was the precursor to the modern concept of nationality. The crown recognised from 1350 that all persons born within the territories of the British Empire were subjects. Those born outside the realm – except children of those serving in an official post abroad, children of the monarch, and children born on a British sailing vessel – were considered by common law to be foreigners. Marriage did not affect the status of a subject of the realm. Antigua was settled by English colonists in 1632 and was formally acquired under terms of the Treaty of Breda in 1667. Until 1655, most of the colonists on the islands came from other islands, like St. Kitts, rather than from English immigration or indenture, and few slaves were imported. Unlike other colonial powers with slave societies in the Caribbean, the British did not have a single slave code. Each British colony was allowed to establish its own rules about the slave trade, and Antigua did so in 1702. The highly stratified Antiguan society established a power hierarchy placing British planters at the top and in descending order, Antiguan-born planters, mixed-race freedmen, Portuguese nationals, nationals of the Middle East, and Afro-Antiguans at the bottom. Married women were subjugated to the authority of their husbands under coverture, and the law was structured to maintain social hierarchies by regulating familial matters like, who could marry, legitimacy, and inheritance. Children in slave societies followed the status of the mother, thus if she was free her children would be free or if she was in bondage, her children would also be bound.

Other than common law, there was no standard statutory law which applied for subjects throughout the realm, meaning different jurisdictions created their own legislation for local conditions, which often conflicted with the laws in other jurisdictions in the empire. (Note: For example, in 1692 the Leeward Islands Legislature passed a law allowing husbands to dispose of a wife's inherited real property, which was forbidden under English common law. In 1875, the Federation legislature passed the Act for the Better Support of Natural Children, which established procedures for determining paternity and thus provide for the support and maintenance of illegitimate children. The Married Women's Property Act of 1887, granted women in the Federation's presidencies similar rights to own and transfer property as had been granted to British women in 1870.) Nationality laws passed by the British Parliament were extended only to the Kingdom of Great Britain, and later the United Kingdom of Great Britain and Ireland. In 1807, the British Parliament passed the Slave Trade Act, barring the Atlantic slave trade in the empire. The Act did not abolish slavery, which did not end until the 1833 Emancipation Act went into effect in 1834. Though the 1833 Act called for a period of apprenticeship before slaves could earn their freedom, none applied in Antigua, and slaves immediately gained their freedom on 1 August 1834. Though free, there was never a British plan to give former slaves a voice in Parliament, leaving them as British subjects in a highly stratified system of rights. Denied political and economic rights, former slaves were not entitled to formal recognition as nationals by other nations.

In 1871, Antigua was designated as one of the six administrative presidencies of the Leeward Islands Federation and the legislature of the federation was granted the authority to regulate family life. Statutes passed by the Federation's legislature had implications for legal status of women and children that would remain through the twentieth century. In 1911, at the Imperial Conference a decision was made to draft a common nationality code for use across the empire. The British Nationality and Status of Aliens Act 1914 allowed local jurisdictions in the self-governing Dominions to continue regulating nationality in their territories, but also established an imperial nationality scheme throughout the realm. The uniform law, which went into effect on 1 January 1915, required a married woman to derive her nationality from her spouse, meaning if he was British, she was also, and if he was foreign, so was she. It stipulated that upon loss of nationality of a husband, a wife could declare that she wished to remain British and provided that if a marriage had terminated, through death or divorce, a British-born national who had lost her status through marriage could reacquire British nationality through naturalisation without meeting a residency requirement. The statute reiterated common law provisions for natural-born persons born within the realm on or after the effective date. By using the word person, the statute nullified legitimacy requirements for jus soli nationals. For those born abroad on or after the effective date, legitimacy was still required, and could only be derived by a child from a British father (one generation), who was natural-born or naturalised. Naturalisations required five years residence or service to the crown.

Amendments were enacted in 1918, 1922, 1933 and 1943 changing derivative nationality by descent and modifying slightly provisions for women to lose their nationality upon marriage. Because of a rise in statelessness, a woman who did not automatically acquire her husband's nationality upon marriage or upon his naturalisation in another country, did not lose their British status after 1933. The 1943 revision allowed a child born abroad at any time to be a British national by descent if the Secretary of State agreed to register the birth. Under the terms of the British Nationality Act 1948 British nationals in Antigua and Barbuda were reclassified at that time as Citizens of the UK and Colonies (CUKC). The basic British nationality scheme did not change overmuch, and typically those who were previously defined as British remained the same. Changes included that wives and children no longer automatically acquired the status of the husband or father, children who acquired nationality by descent no longer were required to make a retention declaration, and registrations for children born abroad were extended. That year, divorce became legal in the Leeward Federation and when it was enacted, it allowed retroactive divorce from 1913.

In 1958, Antigua joined the West Indies Federation. The federation, which included Barbados, British Leeward Islands, the British Windward Islands, Jamaica, and Trinidad and Tobago, was typically seen by its supporters as a means to use a federal structure to gain national independence and eventual recognition as a Dominion. The federation was unable to develop a unified nationality scheme, as member states tended to identify with their specific island, rather than by region. The federation collapsed in 1962, but in 1967, Antigua became an Associated State, under the West Indies Act of that year. Under the terms of the Act, Associated States – Antigua, Dominica, Grenada, Saint Christopher-Nevis-Anguilla, Saint Lucia and Saint Vincent – were on a trajectory to become fully independent and could terminate their association upon becoming an independent Commonwealth country.

=== Post-independence (1981-present) ===
Antigua terminated its Associated State status in 1981 and became an independent country, changing its name to Antigua and Barbuda, effective on 1 November 1981. Generally, persons who had previously been nationals as defined under the classification of "Citizens of the UK and Colonies", would become nationals of Antigua and Barbuda on Independence Day and cease to be British nationals. Exceptions were made for persons to retain their British nationality and status if they (or their father or grandfather) were born, naturalised, or registered in a part of the realm which remained on 1 November part of the United Kingdom or colonies, or had been annexed by such a place. Other exceptions allowed women who might lose their nationality because of marriage to remain British and persons who had established the right of abode in the United Kingdom to retain their British nationality. Under the terms of the Antigua and Barbuda Citizenship Act of 1982, "parent" was defined as including the mother of an illegitimate child. In 1986, legal inequalities between legitimacy and illegitimacy were banished with the passage of the Status of Children Act, and its companion laws the Births Act and Intestate Act, redefining inheritance and status in Antigua and Barbuda. The Birth Act allowed legitimate children to derive nationality from their mothers.
