= Pay Office, Nelson's Dockyard =

Official historic site of Antigua and Barbuda

Pay Office
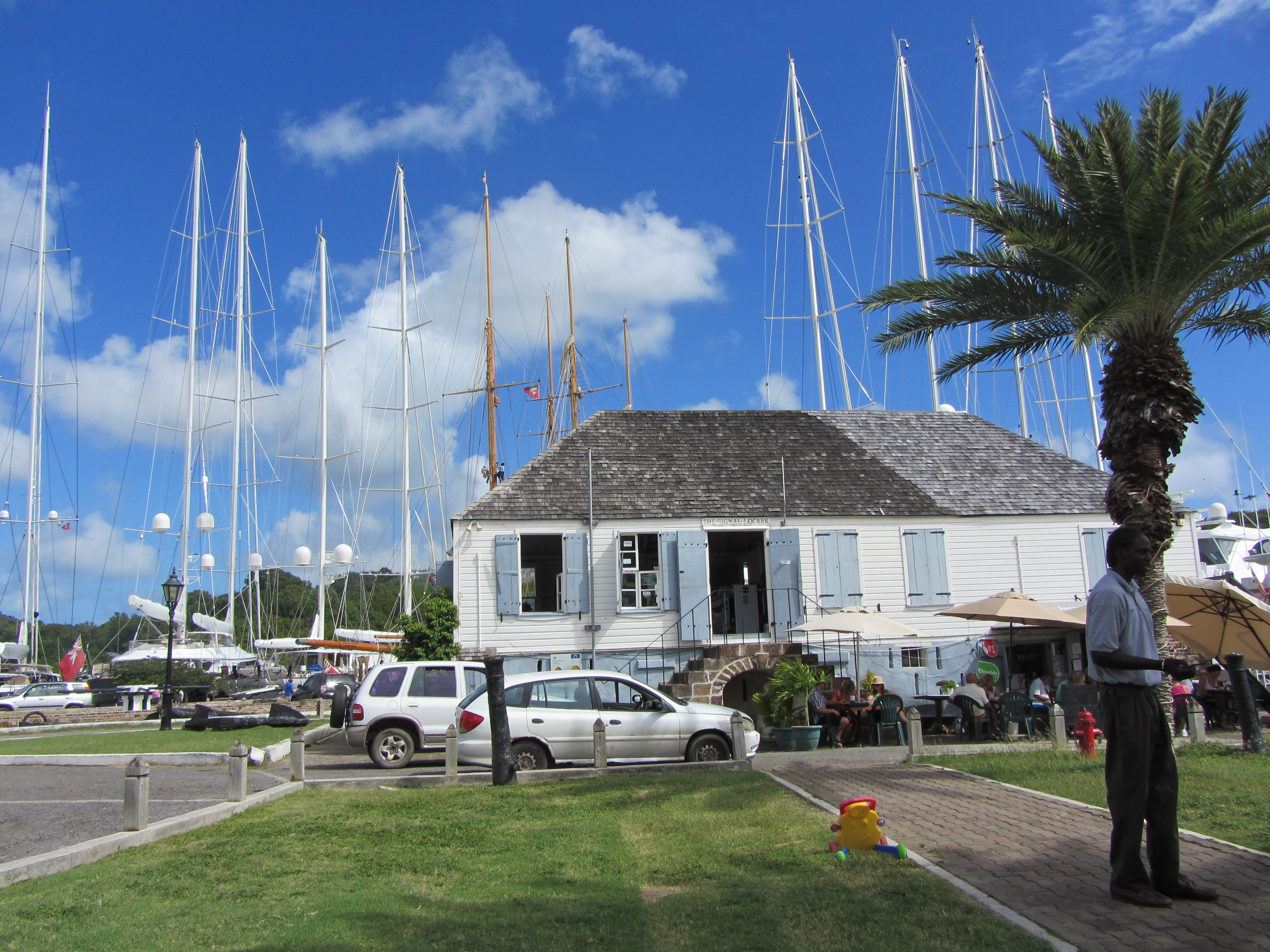
- The building in 2012

- Location within Antigua and Barbuda
- 17°00′29.67″N 61°45′51.06″W
- Location: English Harbour

History
- Built: c. 1807

Historical Site of Antigua and Barbuda

The Pay Office, also known as the Signal Locker, is a historic site in Nelson's Dockyard, English Harbour. It is one of the Antigua Naval Dockyard and Related Archaeological Sites, a UNESCO World Heritage Site. It was built c. 1807 and is currently the headquarters of the national UNESCO committee. The building was built with a hurricane-resistant design and was used to manage the payment of dockworkers, containing four smaller offices inside it to fulfill this purpose.
