= Joiner's Loft and Boathouse, Nelson's Dockyard =

Official historic site of Antigua and Barbuda

Joiner's Loft and Boathouse
- The building in 2026

- Location within Antigua and Barbuda
- 17°00′30.02″N 61°45′55.90″W
- Location: English Harbour

History
- Built: 1778

Historical Site of Antigua and Barbuda

The Joiner's Loft and Boathouse is a historic site in Nelson's Dockyard, English Harbour. It is one of the Antigua Naval Dockyard and Related Archaeological Sites, a UNESCO World Heritage Site. It is a single-storey wooden building directly on the dockyard's waterfront. The building was restored in 1972 and in 2009.
