= Officer's Quarters, Nelson's Dockyard =

Official historic site of Antigua and Barbuda

Officer's Quarters
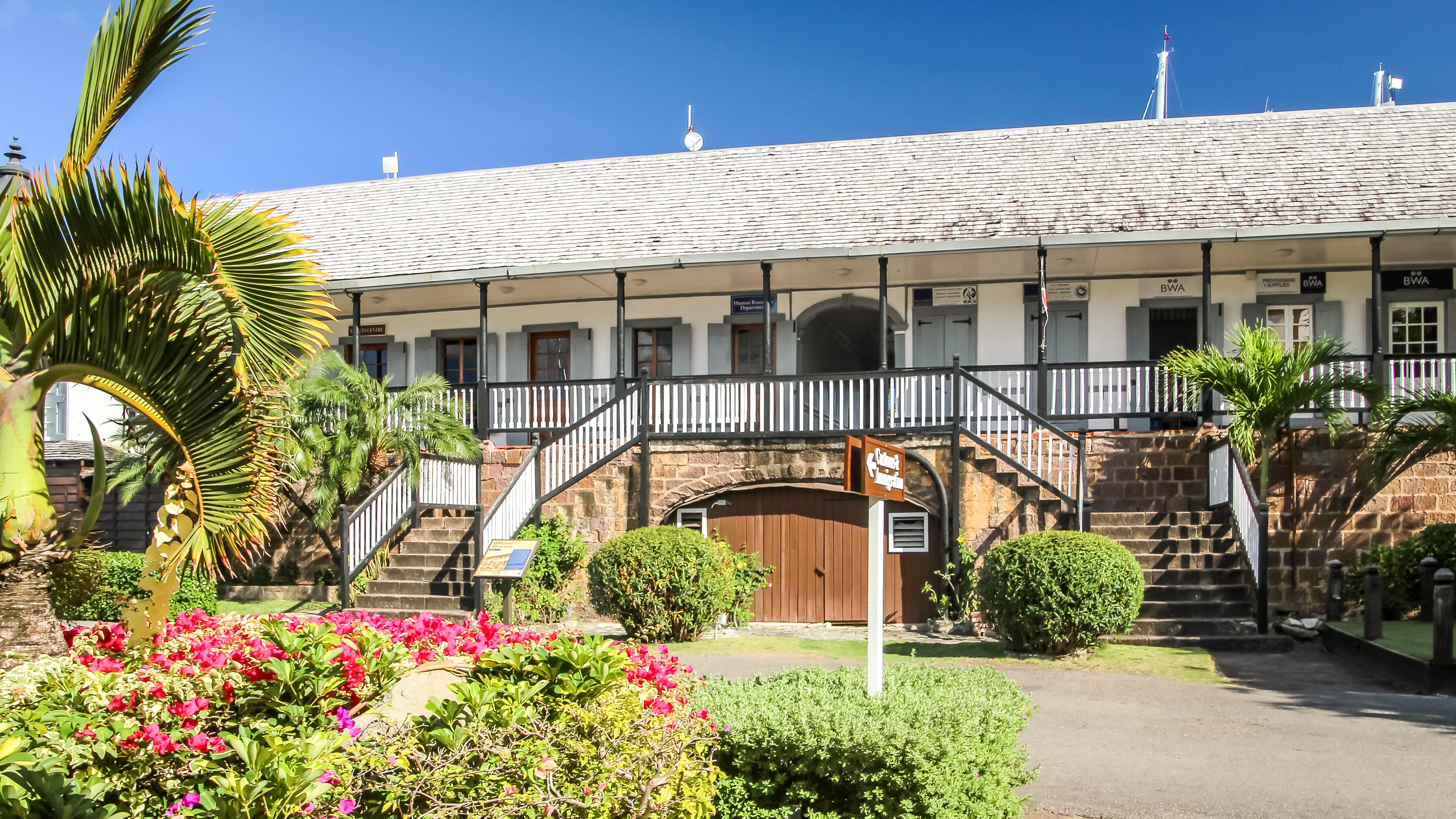
- The building in 2025.

- Location within Antigua and Barbuda
- 17°00′28.92″N 61°45′52.83″W
- Location: English Harbour

History
- Built: 1821

Historical Site of Antigua and Barbuda

The Officer's Quarters are a historic site in Nelson's Dockyard, English Harbour. It is one of the Antigua Naval Dockyard and Related Archaeological Sites, a UNESCO World Heritage Site. It is a large building built in 1821 that was once used to provide housing for the officers of visiting ships.

It covers 666 square metres and has 12 large cisterns on its ground level that can hold 1.2 million litres of water. Tony Johnson restored the building in the early 1960s. It also contains graffiti from Antiguan soldiers that were training for their overseas deployment in World War II.
