= Fort Charlotte, Antigua and Barbuda =

Fort Charlotte
- English Harbour, Antigua

Site information
- Type: Fortification
- Open to the public: Yes
- Condition: Ruins

Location
- Location within Antigua
- Location within Antigua Location within the Caribbean
- Coordinates: 17.0001°N 61.7606°W

Site history
- Built: 1745
- In use: 1740s-1830s

Fort Charlotte was a historic military fort located on the island of Antigua, built in 1745 and later expanded. It was located at the entrance to English Harbour in Saint Paul parish. Originally called South East Point Battery and renamed Horseshoe Battery, the fort was finally renamed in honour of Queen Charlotte. The remains of the fort are part of Nelson's Dockyard National Park and part of the Antigua Naval Dockyard and Related Archaeological Sites UNESCO World Heritage Site.

== History ==
Construction of the modern Naval Dockyard in English Harbour began in the 1740s. During that time, Fort Berkeley was significantly expanded and upgraded, as it guarded the western entrance to English Harbour.

In 1745, a new battery was built across from Fort Berkeley, to guard the eastern entrance to English Harbour. Originally, the fort was called South East Point Battery, and consisted of two gun platforms, a guard house, a kitchen, and latrines. It was armed with 11 cannons. By 1755, the battery had been significantly upgraded and was renamed the Horseshoe Battery.

In 1781, Thomas Shirley, recently appointed Governor of the Leeward Islands, urged the local government to fortify the area around and above English Harbour to better protect the Naval Dockyard. As part of this defense upgrade, a larger gun platform was built above Horseshoe Battery, to function as a signal or communication station. Upon this expansion, the fort was renamed Fort Charlotte in honor of Queen Charlotte.

Fort Charlotte had an iron chain that was strung across the harbour's entrance from Fort Berkeley. The chain could be raised to prevent vessels from entering the harbour.

By the 1840s, the fort had been decommissioned. In 1843, an earthquake destroyed the majority of Fort Charlotte's structures. As a result, little remains of the fort's lower section, and only the gun platform and foundations of the guard house remain of the fort's upper section.

In 1984, the remains of Fort Charlotte became part of Nelson's Dockyard National Park. In 2016, the grounds became part of a UNESCO World Heritage Site, as UNESCO recognized the English Harbour dockyard and the surrounding military archaeological sites together as The Antigua Naval Dockyard and Related Archaeological Sites. The fort is accessible via a short nature trail called Carpenter Rock Trail.
