= Antigua Naval Dockyard and Related Archaeological Sites =

World heritage site in Antigua and Barbuda

UNESCO World Heritage Site
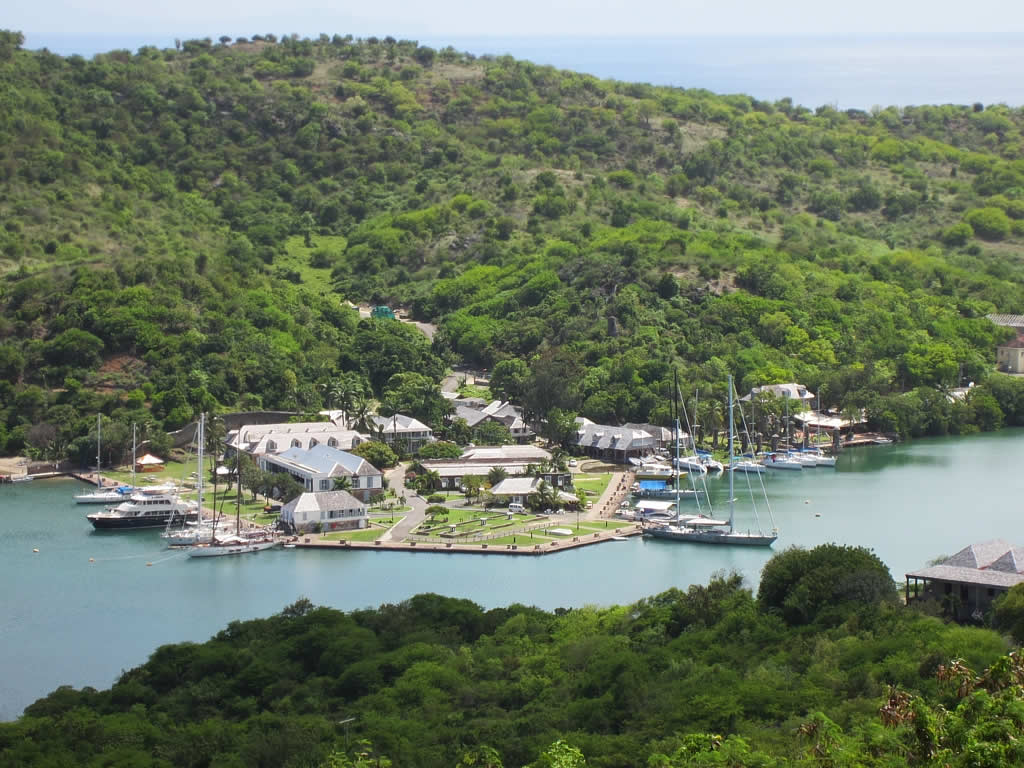
- Nelson's Dockyard

- Location within Antigua Location within Antigua and Barbuda
- Location: Saint Paul Parish, Antigua, Antigua and Barbuda
- Criteria: Cultural: (ii), (iv)
- Reference: 1499
- Inscription: 2016 (40th Session)
- Area: 255 ha (630 acres)
- Buffer zone: 3,873 ha (9,570 acres)
- Coordinates: 17°00′25″N 61°45′52″W

The Antigua Naval Dockyard and Related Archaeological Sites is a 255 ha (630 acres) UNESCO World Heritage Site in Saint Paul, Antigua, Antigua and Barbuda. It constitutes a collection of Georgian era naval structures, namely a naval dockyard and related supporting compounds. This maritime complex was established during a period marked by intense competition among European nations vying for dominance at sea to secure authority over the profitable sugar-producing islands in the Eastern Caribbean.

== Description ==
English Harbour, situated on the southern coast of Antigua, consists of a sequence of deep, narrow bays almost entirely encircled by hills. Accessible through a slender channel bordered by the protective rock formations of Fort Berkeley peninsula and Fort Charlotte Point, the inner bays are well-sheltered and concealed from view. This natural setting served as an ideal hurricane shelter and a location for careening and repairing wooden ships during the Age of Sail, safeguarded by the fortified surrounding highlands. Exploiting these strategic advantages, the British Navy utilized the area from the late 17th century until the late 19th century. The 255-hectare site constitutes the historical heart of Nelson's Dockyard National Park. The 3,873 ha (9,570 acres) buffer zone follows the perimeter of the Nelson's Dockyard National Park.

== History ==
=== Military use ===
The initial British settlement on Antigua occurred in 1632, and the introduction of sugar cane cultivation in the Caribbean islands around the mid-17th century led to rapid expansion. This economic boom generated substantial profits for planters and merchants, prompting the need for secure locations. English Harbour, with its advantageous natural setting and proximity to routes connecting France, became a focal point for exploitation. Initially, local merchants in Antigua capitalized on these advantages, followed by the Royal Navy.

The first structures, Fort Berkeley and Fort Charlotte, were constructed at the harbor's mouth. However, it wasn't until 1725 that English Harbour's potential was seriously considered by British authorities. This realization led to the commencement of dockyard and related service structures construction at St. Helena. In 1743, the Royal Navy initiated the establishment of a significant naval dockyard facility. Over approximately 40 years, a diverse range of buildings, structures, and facilities, including water tanks and catchments, were erected in the dockyard area to support a permanent military force. This military presence aimed to safeguard planters' interests against external and internal threats, as well as conduct raids against rival European powers in nearby islands. Following extensive construction, the harbor became the designated port for vessels during the hurricane season.

A second phase of construction and expansion unfolded in 1781 and persisted for subsequent decades at English Harbour and the surrounding hills, extending from the Blockhouse to the Lookout Point, with a primary focus on defensive measures. Following the establishment of British hegemony in 1814 and the subsequent decline in economic significance of the Leeward Islands, the strategic importance of the Antigua Naval Dockyard waned. The fortifications associated with the naval compound gradually fell into disuse and became obsolete. Although the Dockyard remained in operation, it faced challenges, and in 1889, it was officially decommissioned. The decision was primarily driven by the impracticality of adapting the facility for larger steam vessels, which had superseded sailing ships.

=== Preservation ===
In 1906, the arsenal was transferred to the Antiguan Government. Throughout the two World Wars, the compound served as a military training facility and later as a careening and repair complex for smaller vessels involved in inter-island transportation. It wasn't until the 1950s that the potential of the Dockyard as a heritage tourism site and yachting destination was recognized. In 1951, the Society of the Friends of English Harbour emerged, inspired by similar societies dedicated to preserving ancient buildings in Great Britain. The society aimed to preserve and conserve the dockyard. Through an intensive fundraising campaign, supported by members of the British royal family and other notable figures, the society successfully raised the necessary funds to restore the dockyard structures within five years. In 1961, the completion of the restoration works was celebrated, and the historic compound of the dockyard reopened. Since then, most of the buildings and facilities have been utilized for tourism or yachting, following the established policy of the Friends of English Harbour. In continuation of the efforts initiated by the Society of the Friends of English Harbour, the Government of Antigua and Barbuda enacted the 1984 National Parks Act, officially designating Nelson’s Dockyard as a national park. The funding for the initial establishment of the park was provided by the Canadian International Development Agency. The Antigua Naval Dockyard was listed on the UNESCO Tentative List of World Heritage Sites in 2012. The site was included on the World Heritage List during the 40th Session of the World Heritage Committee held in Istanbul, Turkey from July 10-17, 2016.

== Sites ==
- Antigua Naval Dockyard (Nelson's Dockyard): The dockyard encompasses an ensemble of buildings and facilities. The structures demonstrate how the British Admiralty adapted structures to the Caribbean climate, influencing colonial architecture in other regions.
  - Blacksmith's Shop
  - Canvas and Cordage Building
  - Copper and Lumber Store
  - Dockyard Bakery
  - Engineer's House (Admiral's Inn)
  - Guard Station and Engineer's Building
  - Joiner's Loft and Boathouse
  - Mast Shed
  - Master Shipwright's Cabin
  - Officer's Quarters
  - Pay Office (Signal Locker)
  - Porters' Lodge
  - Sail Loft Pillars
  - Sawpit Shed
  - Seamen's Galley
  - Senior Officer's House (Dockyard Museum)
- Clarence House: Exemplifies the modification of Georgian architecture for the Caribbean's tropical climate, showcasing the emergence of a distinct colonial Georgian style.
- Fort Berkeley: Built in 1704 on the harbor's western side, Fort Berkeley defended the inner bays. Its remaining features include defensive walls, a powder magazine, and a guardhouse.
- Fort Charlotte: Established in 1745 opposite side Fort Berkeley. Unfortunately, little remains of this structure.
- Fort Charles
- Fort Cuyler
- Dow's Hill Fort
- Shirley Heights
- Middle Ground
- Artillery Officers Complex
- The Blockhouse complex
- The Lookout
- Middle Ground cisterns

== Bibliography ==
- The Antigua Naval Dockyard (Antigua and Barbuda) No 1499, International Council on Monuments and Sites, 2016, pp. 237–250
- The Antigua Naval Dockyard and Related Archaeological Sites World Heritage Site Nomination Document 2014 (PDF), 2014
