= Master Shipwright's Cabin =

Official historic site of Antigua and Barbuda

- The building in 2026

- Location within Antigua and Barbuda
- 17°00′29.03″N 61°45′56.26″W
- Location: English Harbour

History
- Built: 1769

Historical Site of Antigua and Barbuda

The Master Shipwright's Cabin is a historic site in Nelson's Dockyard, English Harbour. It is one of the Antigua Naval Dockyard and Related Archaeological Sites, a UNESCO World Heritage Site. It is adjacent to the Sawpit Shed and was built in 1769. It is a two-storey brick building that was the home of the master shipwright, the person who oversaw the repair of boats docked in the harbour.
