= Clarence House, English Harbour =

Official historic site of Antigua and Barbuda

Clarence House
- Clarence House in 2026.

- Location within Antigua and Barbuda
- 17°0′36″N 61°45′44″W
- Location: English Harbour

History
- Built: 1804

Historical Site of Antigua and Barbuda

Clarence House is a museum in the Ordnance Bay neighbourhood of English Harbour. It is one of the Antigua Naval Dockyard and Related Archaeological Sites, a UNSECO World Heritage Site. The house was built in 1804 for the island's naval commissioner, and was primarily used to entertain visiting officials. As the naval dockyard lost its importance, the house was then converted into the official country home for the Governor of Antigua. Notable guests include Winston Churchill and Princess Diana. The building was restored in 2012 after a series of hurricanes in the 1990s severely damaged it.
