= Dockyard Bakery =

Official historic site of Antigua and Barbuda

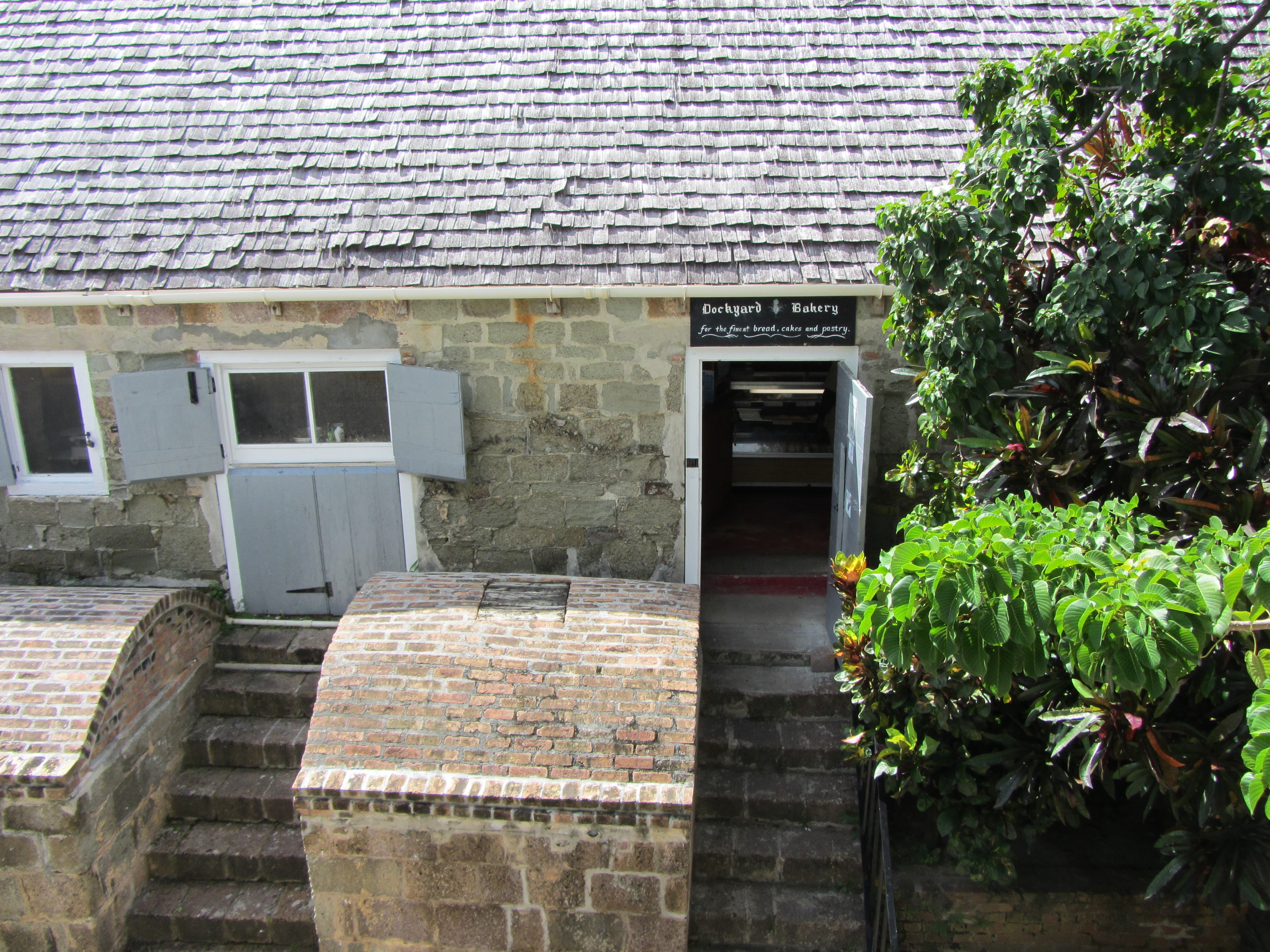
- The bakery in 2012.

- Location within Antigua and Barbuda
- 17°00′27.97″N 61°45′55.55″W
- Location: English Harbour

History
- Built: 1772

Historical Site of Antigua and Barbuda

The Dockyard Bakery is a historic site in Nelson's Dockyard, English Harbour. It is one of the Antigua Naval Dockyard and Related Archaeological Sites, a UNESCO World Heritage Site. It is a small stone and brick building built in 1772. It continues to provide baked goods and pastries to dockyard workers and tourists.
