= Mast Shed, Nelson's Dockyard =

Official historic site of Antigua and Barbuda

Mast Shed
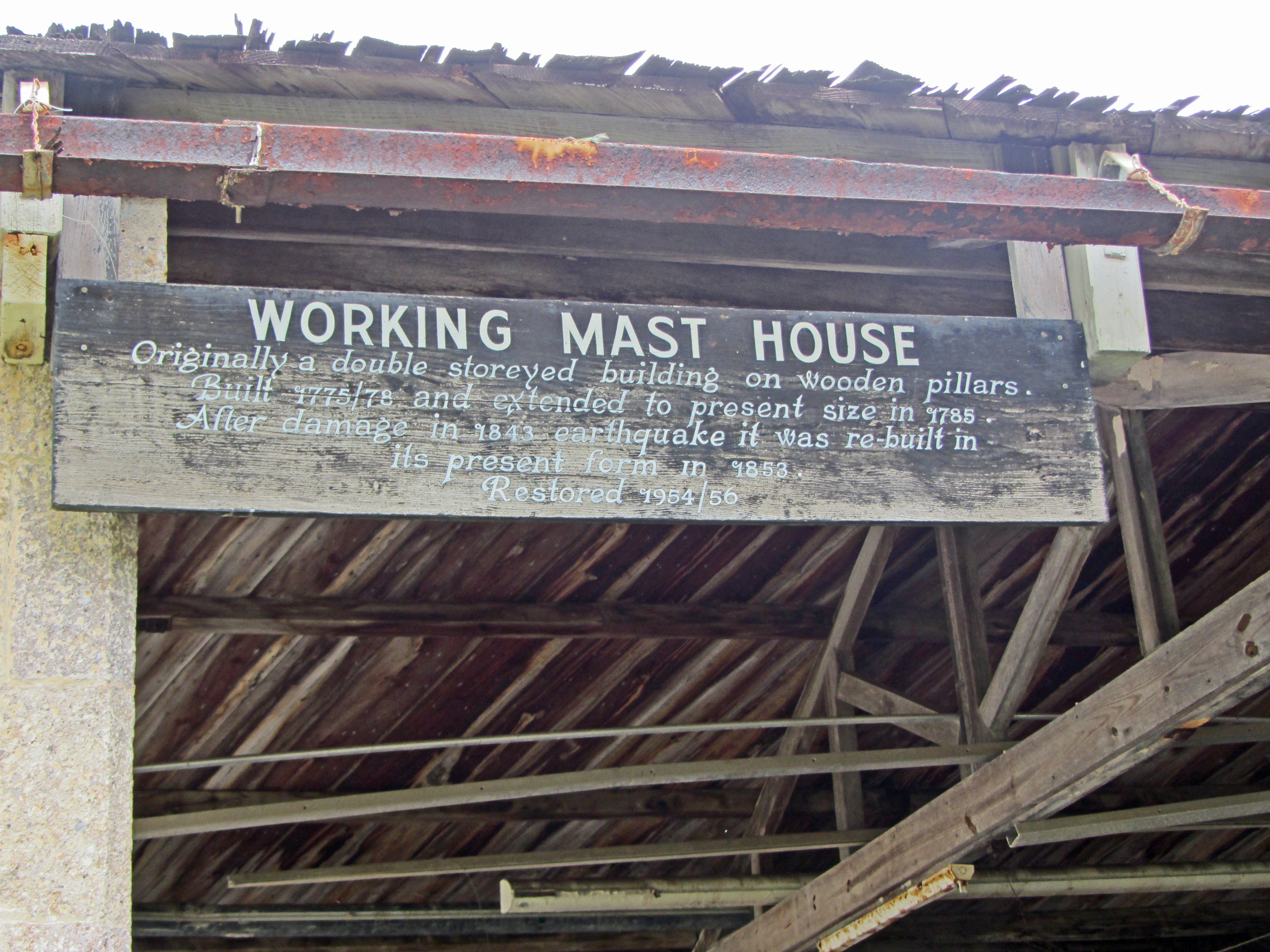
- Sign for the Mast Shed

- Location within Antigua and Barbuda
- 17°00′29.35″N 61°45′54.68″W
- Location: English Harbour

History
- Built: c. 1789

Historical Site of Antigua and Barbuda

The Mast Shed is a historic site in Nelson's Dockyard, English Harbour. It is one of the Antigua Naval Dockyard and Related Archaeological Sites, a UNESCO World Heritage Site. It is an open structure built c. 1789 covering 439 square metres. This building provided a shaded space for those working on masts and spars.
