= The Seamen's Galley =

Official historic site of Antigua and Barbuda

- The building in 2026

- Location within Antigua and Barbuda
- 17°00′30.70″N 61°45′52.71″W
- Location: English Harbour

History
- Built: 1778

Historical Site of Antigua and Barbuda

The Seamen's Galley, also known as the Galley Boutique, is a historic site in Nelson's Dockyard, English Harbour. It is one of the Antigua Naval Dockyard and Related Archaeological Sites, a UNESCO World Heritage Site. It was built in 1778 and was a popular spot for dockworkers to cook their meals and socialize. Today, the one-storey building houses a restaurant.
