= Porters' Lodge, Nelson's Dockyard =

Official historic site of Antigua and Barbuda

Porters' Lodge
- The building in 2026

- Location within Antigua and Barbuda
- 17°00′29.98″N 61°45′56.30″W
- Location: English Harbour

History
- Built: 1778

Historical Site of Antigua and Barbuda

The Porters' Lodge, also known as the Sick Lodge, is a historic site in Nelson's Dockyard, English Harbour. It is one of the Antigua Naval Dockyard and Related Archaeological Sites, a UNESCO World Heritage Site. It is located close to the boundary fence of the dockyard and is a small building that was used by the marines until 1783. Between 1797 and 1853 it was also used as a sick house. Currently the building is an extension of the Admiral's Inn hotel.
