= Guard Station and Engineer's Building =

Official historic site of Antigua and Barbuda

- The building in 2026

- Location within Antigua and Barbuda
- 17°00′29.12″N 61°45′56.75″W
- Location: English Harbour

History
- Built: 1776

Historical Site of Antigua and Barbuda

The Guard Station and Engineer's Building is a historic site in Nelson's Dockyard, English Harbour. It is one of the Antigua Naval Dockyard and Related Archaeological Sites, a UNSECO World Heritage Site. The building was built in two phases: the guard station being built in 1778 and the engineer's building being built in 1776. It is a long brick building located at the dockyard's perimeter and today is mostly used for storage purposes.
