= Middle Ground (Antigua) =

- Neighbourhood
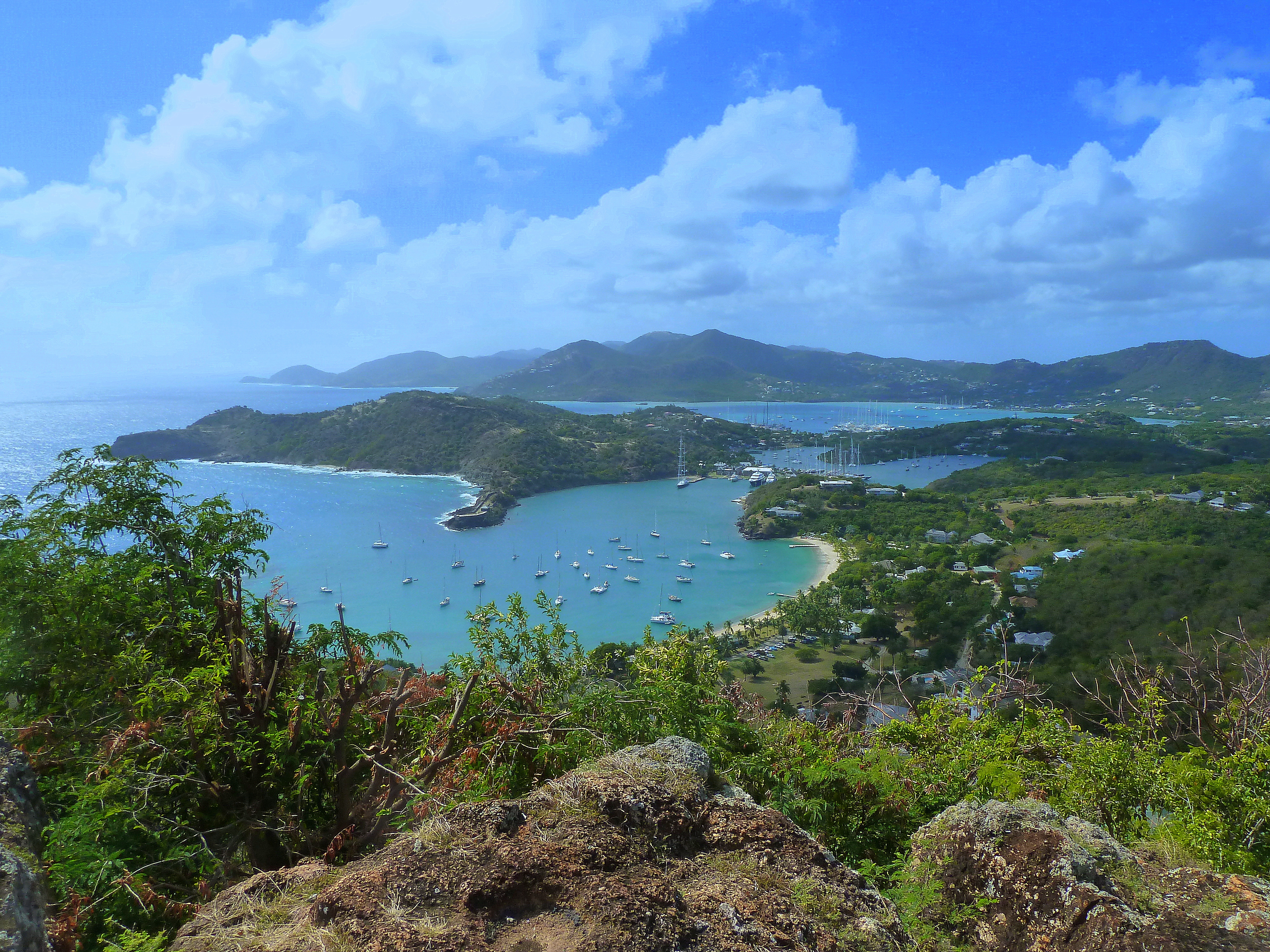
- Middle Ground peninsula from Shirley Heights

- Location within Antigua and Barbuda
- Coordinates: 17°00′27.6″N 61°46′14.4″W
- Country: Antigua and Barbuda
- Parish: Saint Paul
- Town: English Harbour

Government
  - MP: Paul Chet Greene

Population (2001)
  - Total: 112
- Time zone: UTC-4 (AST)

Middle Ground is a peninsula in the south of the Caribbean island of Antigua, in the state of Antigua and Barbuda. It is also a district of English Harbour, which is part of the central area of Nelson's Dockyard National Park.

== Geography ==
Middle Ground is located between Falmouth Harbour, in the centre of the south coast, and the eastern adjacent small Freeman's Bay. It is connected to the mainland only by a narrow land bridge and thus forms two natural ports– English Harbour and Falmouth Harbour. About 100 inhabitants live on the land side, the south of the peninsula is natural and occupied by tourists.

== History ==
English Harbour was one of the most important naval war ports of the Royal Navy in the Caribbean, Falmouth Harbour in the Great Bay was more of a trading port. Middle Ground was heavily fortified. On the hill was Fort Cuyler, which guarded both bay entrances. Fort Berkeley was built on the landing into Freeman's Bay. Above that was the position of Keane's Battery. At the cape of Falmouth Bay, Blake's Point, was the Blake's Point Battery.

In the 1980s, the Antiguan Environmental Awareness Group (EAG) proposed a "Shirley Heights and Middle Ground Protected Area". In 1984, the protected area on the peninsula was then implemented as "Nelson's Dockyard National Park" (NDNP), which with over 40 square kilometres was protected– the entire southern coast of the parish. Middle Ground is part of the core area of the park.

Quays and buildings of the former Royal Navy Port now form the Nelson's Dockyard Open-Air Museum, which is one of the island's main tourist attractions as a showport. Of the military facilities, only Fort Berkeley is preserved, which can be reached within a short walk from the dockyards, otherwise there are at most remains of the wall.

In the west of the peninsula lies Pigeon Point Beach, the town's popular beach. On the south side is the less popular Windward Beach, which looks out over the open sea. From Fort Berkeley to Pigeon Beach, there is a hiking trail, the Middle Ground Trail. The path offers a good view of the region, but also leads through the eastern part of the island, which is strongly affected by desertification by deforestation and later grazing.

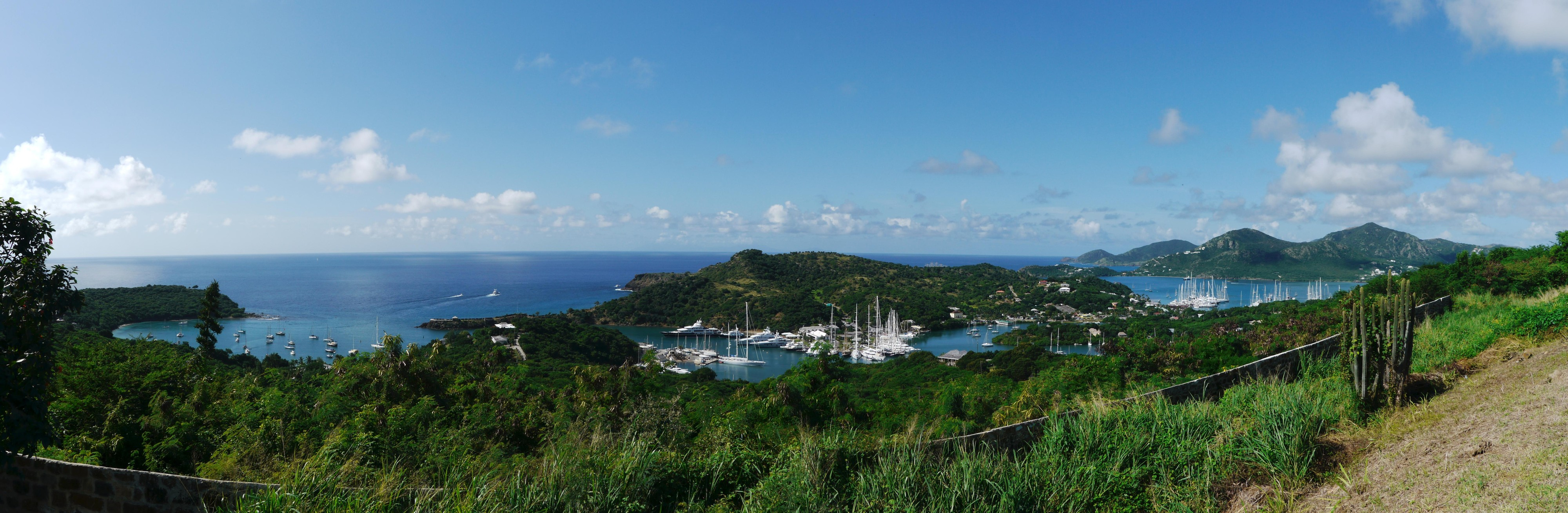
Panorama over the Middle Ground peninsula
