= Shirley Heights =

Shirley Heights may refer to:

- Shirley Heights, Antigua and Barbuda
- Shirley Heights (horse)
