= Admiral's Inn =

Official historic site of Antigua and Barbuda

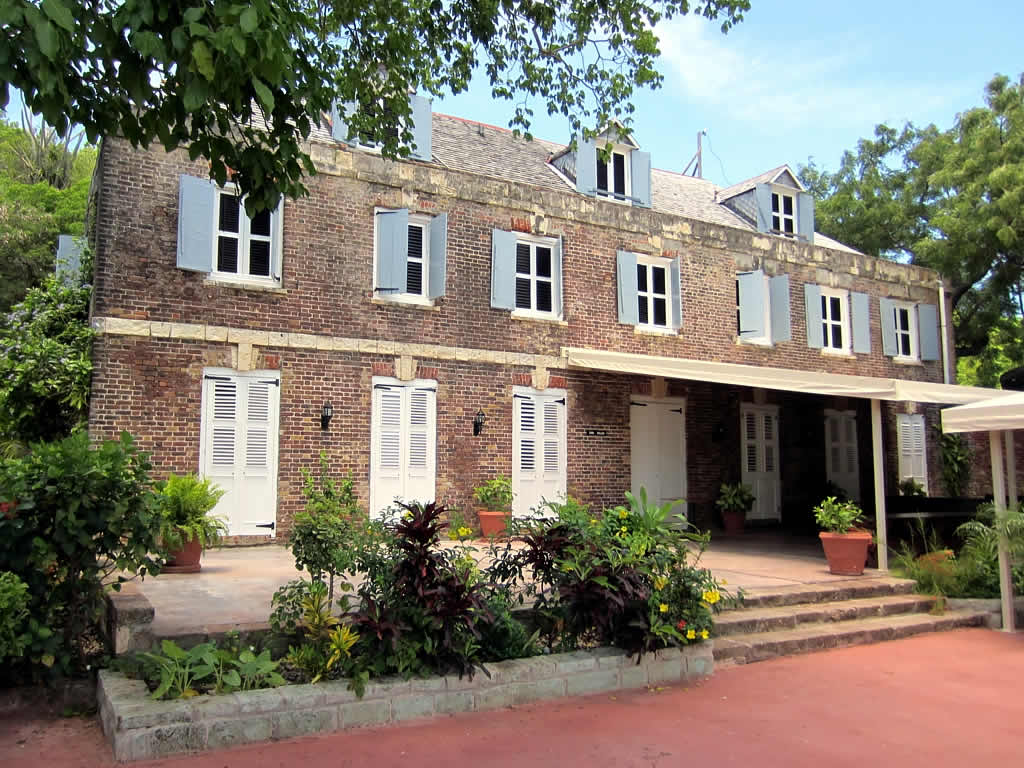

- Location within Antigua and Barbuda
- 17°00′30.91″N 61°45′57.97″W
- Location: English Harbour

History
- Built: 1785

Historical Site of Antigua and Barbuda

Admiral's Inn is a luxury hotel in the Middle Ground neighbourhood of English Harbour. Listed as the Engineer's House, it is one of the Antigua Naval Dockyard and Related Archaeological Sites, a UNESCO World Heritage Site. It is located just outside of the boundaries of Nelson's Dockyard. The Georgian-style house contains two storeys and an attic: it is a brick building that was once used as offices and residences for the engineers that tended to the dockyard.
