= Dow's Hill Interpretation Centre =

Antiguan museum

Coordinates: 17°00′39″N 61°45′27″W

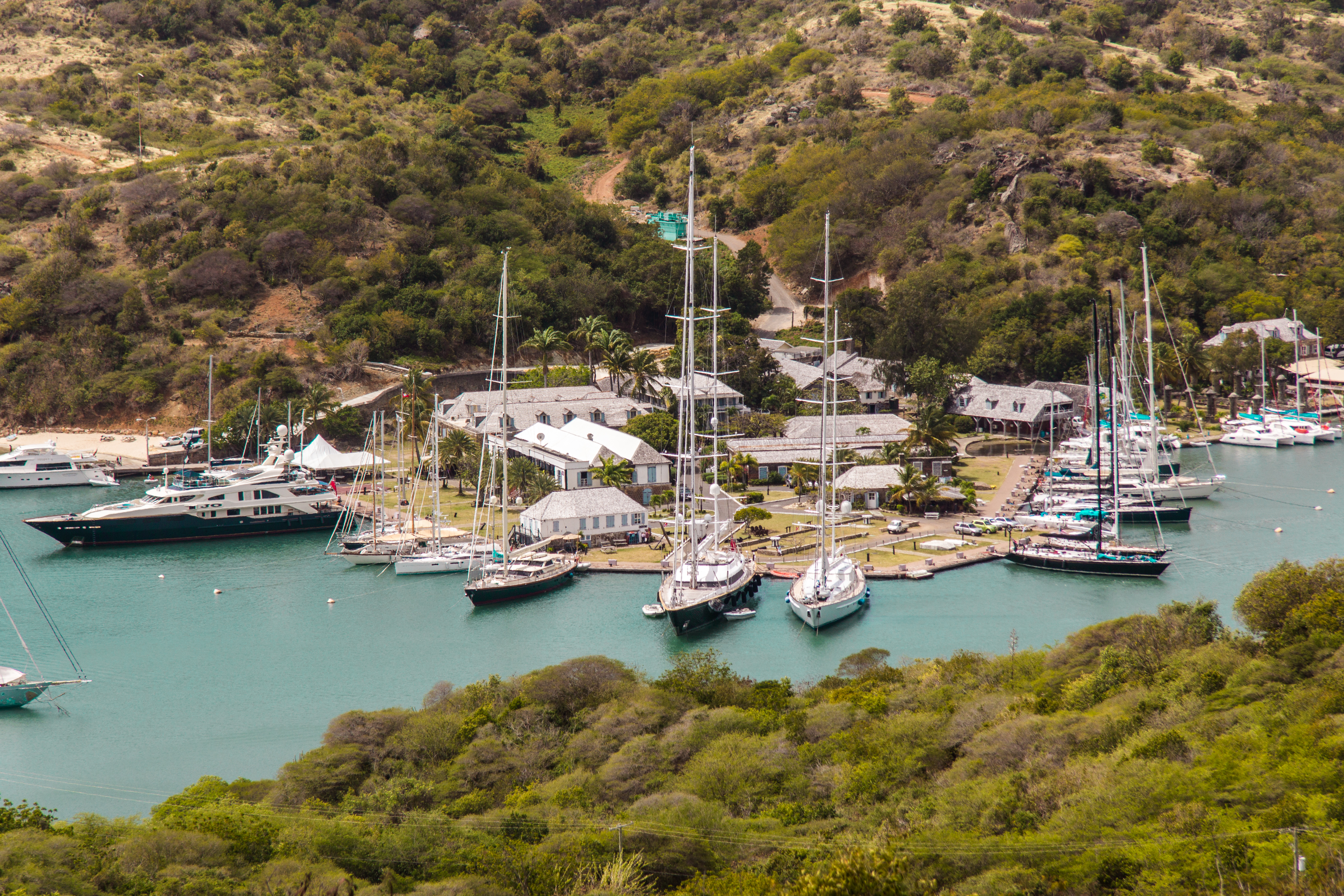
Part of the English Harbour as viewed from Dow's Hill

Dow's Hill Interpretation Centre is a museum on Antigua. The hill was part of the estate of Archibald Dow, a civilian Royal Navy official, before it was acquired for the construction of fortifications. Dow's House became a residence for senior garrison officers and then the Governor of the Leeward Islands before it was destroyed by an 1834 earthquake. The museum was established in 1989 with funding from the Canadian International Development Agency and provides a presentation of Antiguan history and tours of nearby ruins.

== History ==
The hill overlooks English Harbour and offers views of the first European settlements on Antigua, established in the early 17th century, and of the fortifications surrounding Nelson's Dockyard. The hill formed part of the estate of Archibald Dow, the civilian storekeeper at the dockyard, who constructed a house there in 1732. The land was compulsorily acquired from Dow in 1789 at a cost of £8,354 0s 8d to allow fortifications to be constructed to protect the ridgeline from attack from the landward side. The fortifications were built by the Royal Engineers and included stone walls intended to make the fortifications appear more imposing to potential attackers than they actually were. Dow's house was used by senior officers of the garrison before being converted to a residence for the Governor of the Leeward Islands. This was destroyed in an earthquake of 1834, which also ended the permanent presence of a garrison on the site.

== Museum ==
A grant of $11 million was provided by the Canadian International Development Agency in 1989 to establish a museum on Dow's Hill, to cater for tourists. The museum was sited close to the ruins of the governor's residence. The museum is operated by the Antigua and Barbuda National Parks Authority and is open daily from 9:00 to 17:00. It contains a gift shop and café-cum-bar. The museum shows a multimedia presentation of Antiguan history from the first Amerindian settlers through to the European agricultural settlements, the island's role as a British military base and the campaign for independence. The museum offers walking tours to nearby historic sites and a weekly "Rum in the Ruins" tour where visitors receive a guided visit to the ruins whilst enjoying rum cocktails.
