= Canvas and Cordage Building =

Official historic site of Antigua and Barbuda

- The remains in 2026

- Location within Antigua and Barbuda
- 17°00′29.87″N 61°45′53.99″W
- Location: English Harbour

History
- Built: 1792

Historical Site of Antigua and Barbuda

The Canvas and Cordage Building is a historic site in Nelson's Dockyard, English Harbour. It is one of the Antigua Naval Dockyard and Related Archaeological Sites, a UNESCO World Heritage Site. It was built in 1792 and due to severe damage from a 1950 hurricane was never fully restored. Currently, several tents are located in the building's walls used for immigration processing.
