= Copper and Lumber Store =

Official historic site of Antigua and Barbuda

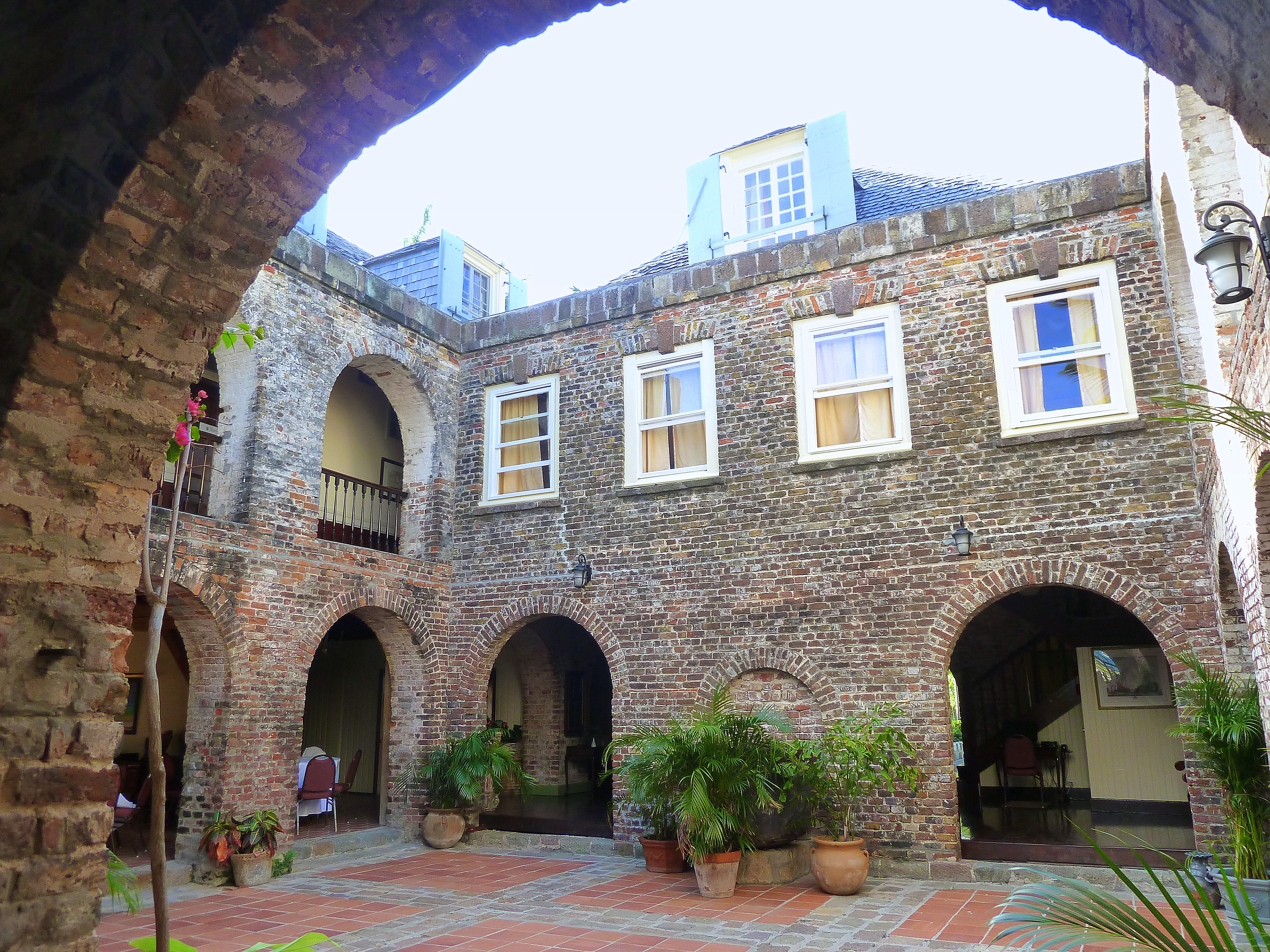
- The building in 2012.

- Location within Antigua and Barbuda
- 17°00′28.40″N 61°45′53.98″W
- Location: English Harbour

History
- Built: 1789

Historical Site of Antigua and Barbuda

The Copper and Lumber Store is a historic site in Nelson's Dockyard, English Harbour. It is one of the Antigua Naval Dockyard and Related Archaeological Sites, a UNESCO World Heritage Site. It is one of the most architecturally imposing buildings in the complex and was built in 1789.
