= Marsh Village =

- Village
- The village in August 2026
- Interactive map of the Marsh Village main place
- Location within Antigua
- Coordinates: 17°01′18″N 61°45′42″W
- Country: Antigua and Barbuda
- Island: Antigua
- Civil parish: Saint Paul
- Time zone: UTC-4 (AST)

Marsh Village is a village in Saint Paul Parish, Antigua and Barbuda.

== Demographics ==
Marsh Village has one enumeration district, ED 72100 MarshVillage.

=== Census data (2011) ===
Compiled from "Antigua and Barbuda::Statistics Division/Redatam Webserver | Statistical Process and Dissemination Tool". redatam.org.

==== Individual ====
Q48 ethnic	Counts	%
African descendent	293	96.17%
Caucasian/White	11	3.48%
Mixed (Black/White)	1	0.35%
Total	304	100.00%

Q49 religion	Counts	%
Adventist	11	3.48%
Anglican	87	28.57%
Baptist	12	3.83%
Evangelical	2	0.70%
Jehovah Witness	3	1.05%
Methodist	84	27.53%
Moravian	29	9.41%
Nazarene	3	1.05%
None/no religion	20	6.62%
Pentecostal	22	7.32%
Rastafarian	1	0.35%
Roman Catholic	7	2.44%
Weslyan Holiness	3	1.05%
Other	11	3.48%
Don't know/Not stated	10	3.14%
Total	304	100.00%

Q55 internet use	Counts	%
Yes	143	47.04%
No	154	50.52%
Don't know/Not stated	7	2.44%
Total	304	100.00%

Q58. country of birth	Counts	%
Africa	2	0.70%
Antigua and Barbuda	240	78.75%
Other Caribbean countries	6	2.09%
Canada	3	1.05%
Other European countries	4	1.39%
Dominica	5	1.74%
Guyana	3	1.05%
Jamaica	7	2.44%
St. Kitts and Nevis	2	0.70%
St. Lucia	1	0.35%
St. Vincent and the Grenadines	1	0.35%
United Kingdom	6	2.09%
USA	14	4.53%
USVI United States Virgin Islands	2	0.70%
Not Stated	6	2.09%
Total	304	100.00%

Q71 country of citizenship 1	Counts	%
Antigua and Barbuda	281	92.33%
Other Caribbean countries	1	0.35%
Canada	1	0.35%
Dominica	1	0.35%
Guyana	4	1.39%
Jamaica	4	1.39%
United Kingdom	3	1.05%
USA	4	1.39%
Other countries	2	0.70%
Not Stated	2	0.70%
Total	304	100.00%

Q71 country of citizenship 2 (country of second/dual citizenship)	Counts	%
Other Caribbean countries	7	17.07%
Canada	2	4.88%
Dominica	4	9.76%
Jamaica	2	4.88%
St. Lucia	1	2.44%
St. Vincent and the Grenadines	1	2.44%
United Kingdom	13	29.27%
USA	10	21.95%
Other countries	3	7.32%
Total	43	100.00%
NotApp :	261	

employment status	Counts	%
Employed	134	55.51%
Unemployed	7	3.08%
Inactive	97	40.09%
Not stated	3	1.32%
Total	241	100.00%
NotApp :	64	

==== Household ====
Marsh Village has 104 households.

Total number of persons	Counts	%
1	25	24.04%
2	24	23.08%
3	24	23.08%
4	21	20.19%
5	5	4.81%
6	1	0.96%
7	2	1.92%
8	1	0.96%
9 and over	1	0.96%
Total	104	100.00%

Q4 year built	Counts	%
Before 1980	12	11.54%
1980 - 1989	20	19.23%
1990 - 1999	26	25.00%
2000 - 2006	12	11.54%
Year 2007	2	1.92%
Year 2008	3	2.88%
Year 2009	4	3.85%
Year 2010	2	1.92%
Don't Know/not stated	23	22.12%
Total	104	100.00%

Q11 garbage disposal	Counts	%
Garbage truck private	7	6.73%
Garbage truck public	97	93.27%
Total	104	100.00%

Q23 3a desktop computer	Counts	%
Yes	30	28.85%
No	74	71.15%
Total	104	100.00%

Q23 3b laptop computer	Counts	%
Yes	33	31.73%
No	71	68.27%
Total	104	100.00%

Q23 10 radio	Counts	%
Yes	78	75.00%
No	26	25.00%
Total	104	100.00%

Q23 9 mobile device	Counts	%
Yes	89	85.58%
No	15	14.42%
Total	104	100.00%

Q24 motor vehicles	Counts	%
0	23	24.21%
1	39	41.05%
2	27	28.42%
3	2	2.11%
4 or more	4	4.21%
Total	95	100.00%
Missing :	9	

Q25 4 internet access	Counts	%
No	67	64.42%
Yes	28	26.92%
Don't know/not declared	9	8.65%
Total	104	100.00%
