= Fort Berkeley =

- English Harbour, Antigua
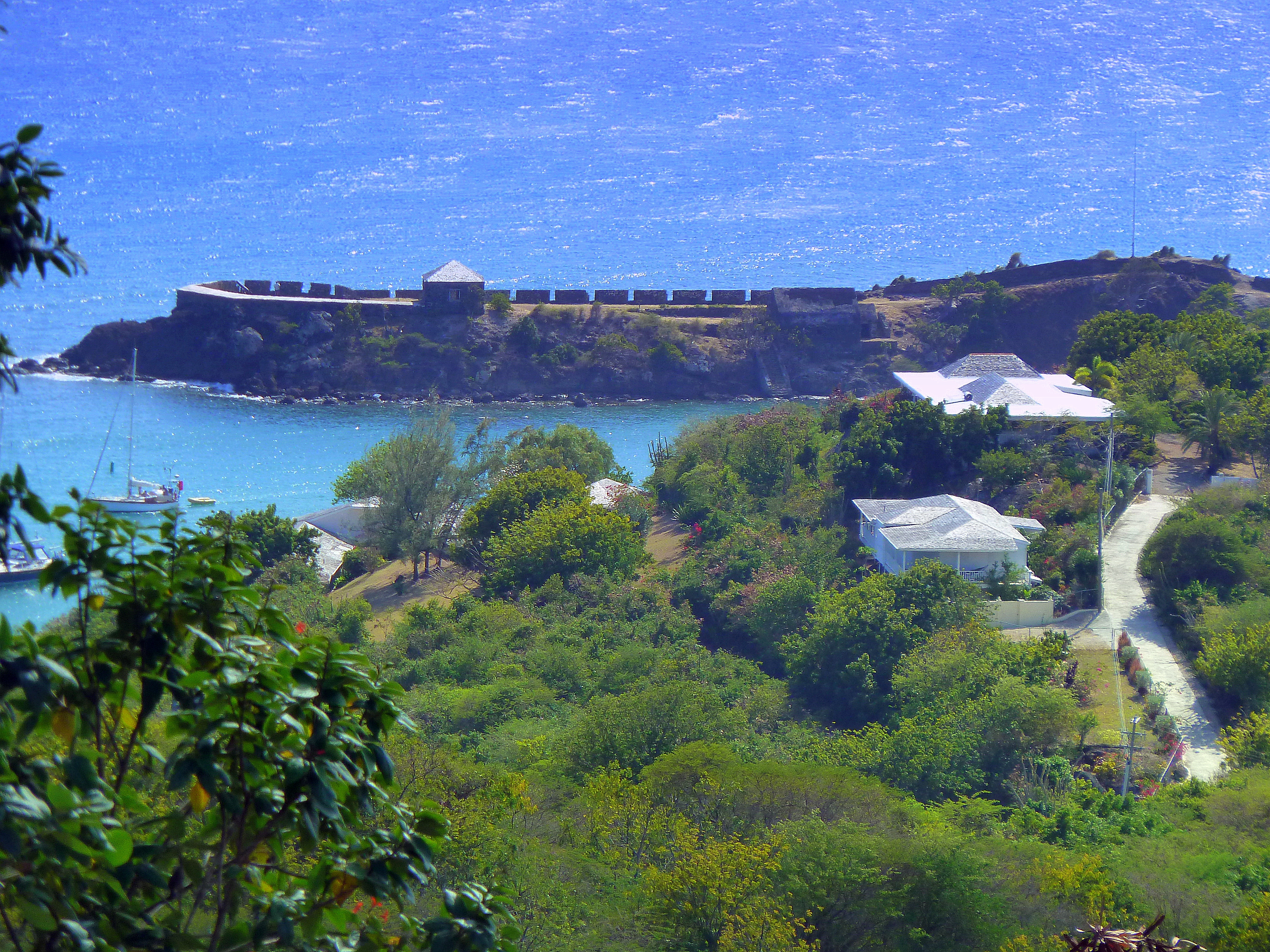
- View of Fort Berkeley remains

Site information
- Type: Fortification
- Open to the public: Yes
- Condition: Partially restored

Location
- Location within Antigua
- Location within Antigua Location within the Caribbean
- Coordinates: 17.00°N 61.76°W

Site history
- Built: 1704
- In use: 1700s-1820s

Fort Berkeley is a historic military fort on the island of Antigua. It is located at the entrance to English Harbour in Saint Paul parish. The fort was built in 1704 and expanded in the mid 18th century. It is part of Nelson's Dockyard National Park and the Antigua Naval Dockyard and Related Archaeological Sites UNESCO World Heritage Site.

== History ==
Fort Berkeley was built in 1704, on a peninsular strip of land at the entrance to English Harbour. It was originally a simple fortification, consisting of an enclosed area with a gate and guardhouse. A construction of the Antiguan government, the fort was manned by government hires rather than by soldiers.

In 1745, Fort Berkeley was significantly expanded and upgraded with the development of English Harbour's Naval dockyard. The first half of the new battery was built by the Antiguan government. The second half was built by the Royal Navy under Commodore Charles Knowles. According to Knowles, he commissioned the construction's completion after the Antiguan government refused to continue funding the construction. As a result, the two halves of the battery were built with two different architectural and tactical styles. The British government criticized and removed Commodore Knowles from his post for involving the British in the completion of the battery, which they saw as an Antiguan government responsibility.

After its expansion in the 1740s, Fort Berkeley had a magazine and a guardhouse, and was armed with 29 guns: 19 mounted cannons and an additional battery of 10 guns belonging to the Navy. Additionally, the fort had an iron chain that was strung across the harbour's entrance from Fort Charlotte. The chain could be raised to prevent vessels from entering the harbour.

In 1783, the Antiguan government turned the fort over to the British Navy. In 1807, the British added the gunpowder magazine to the fort. There is evidence that Fort Berkeley was used as a quarantine station. In 1843, an earthquake destroyed most of Fort Berkeley's original wall.

The current remains of Fort Berkeley include the powder magazine, guard house, crenelated walls, and a canon from 1805 in its original position. The fort is accessible via a short nature trail called Fort Berkeley Trail.

In 1984, Fort Berkeley became part of Nelson's Dockyard National Park. In 2016, it became part of a UNESCO World Heritage Site, as UNESCO recognized the English Harbour dockyard and the surrounding military archaeological sites together as "The Antigua Naval Dockyard and Related Archaeological Sites."

== Preservation ==
Stabilization projects have been implemented due to waves eroding the peninsula on which the Fort sits. Nelson's Dockyard National Park began a maintenance program to keep the walls of Fort Berkeley intact to deflect the storm surges. Antigua's National Parks Authority have discussed plans for further stabilization of the ruins and protection of the peninsula and the harbour.

== Gallery ==
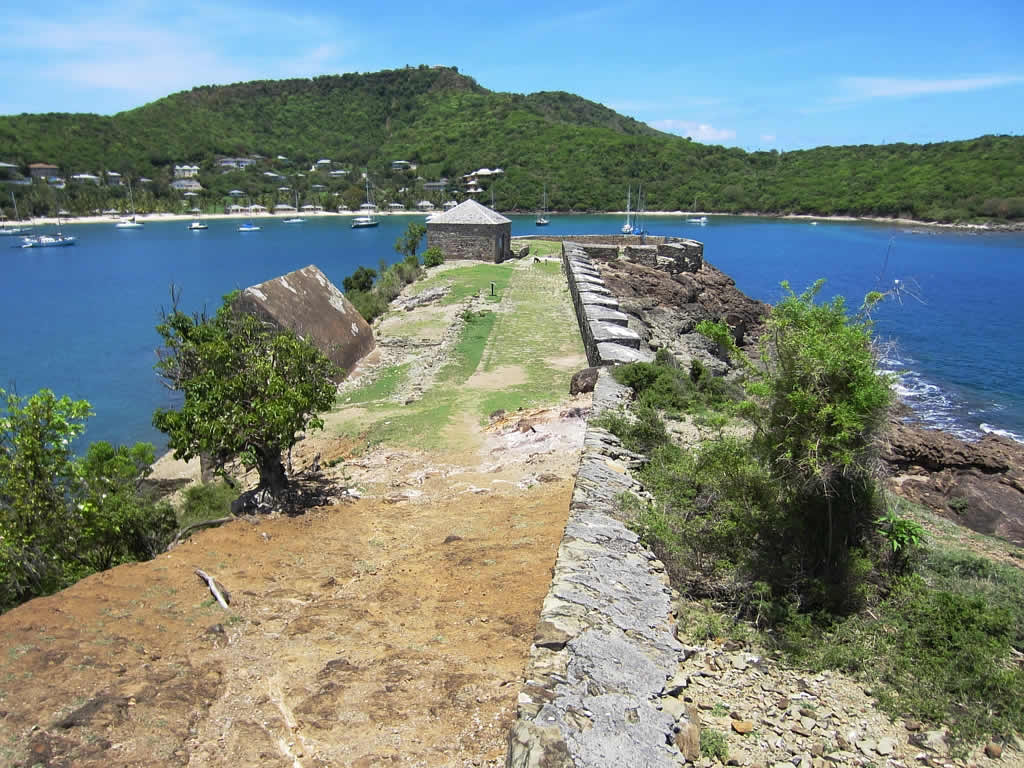
Remains of Fort Berkeley

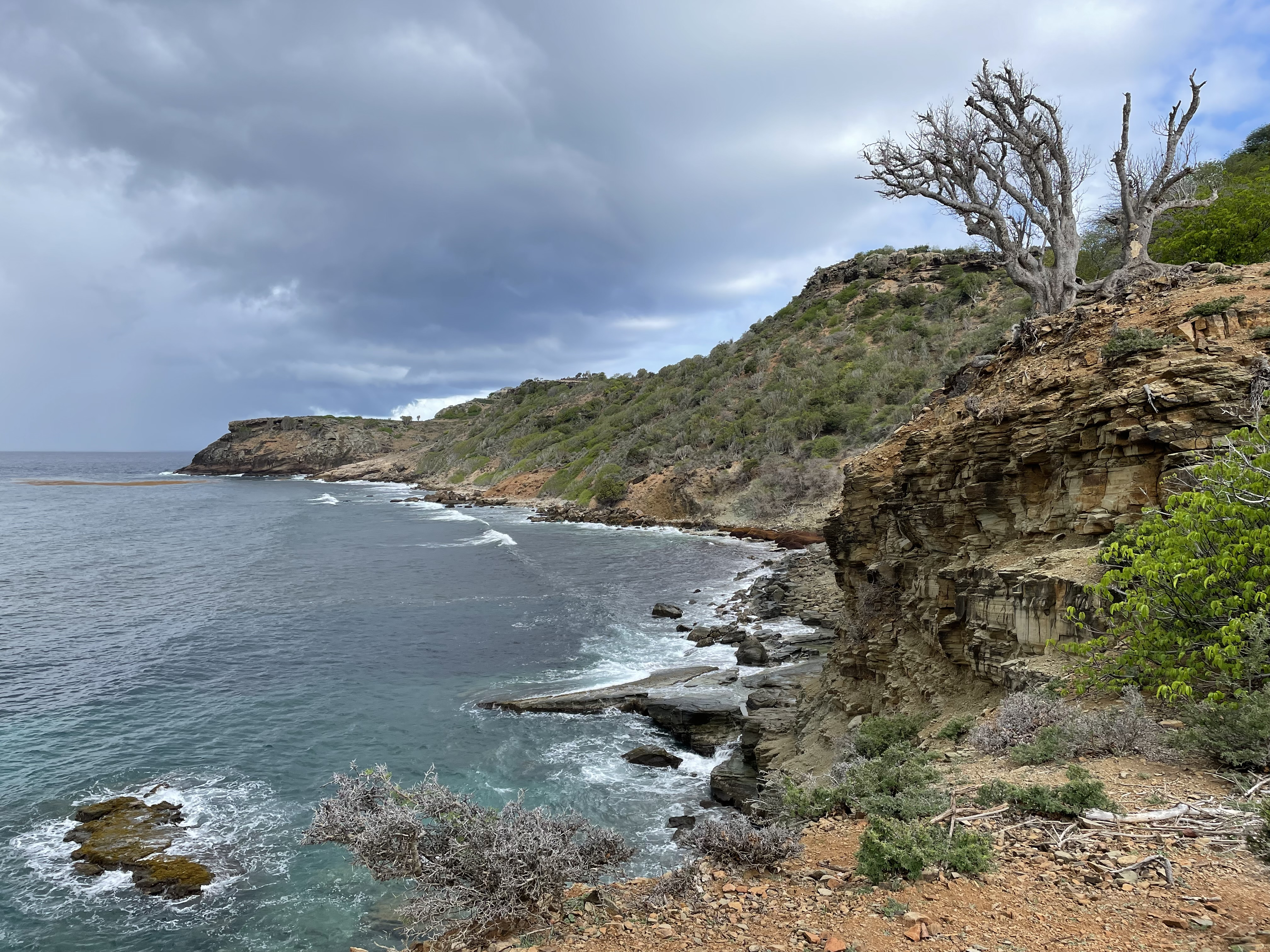
View of Fort Berkeley on the peninsula in the distance

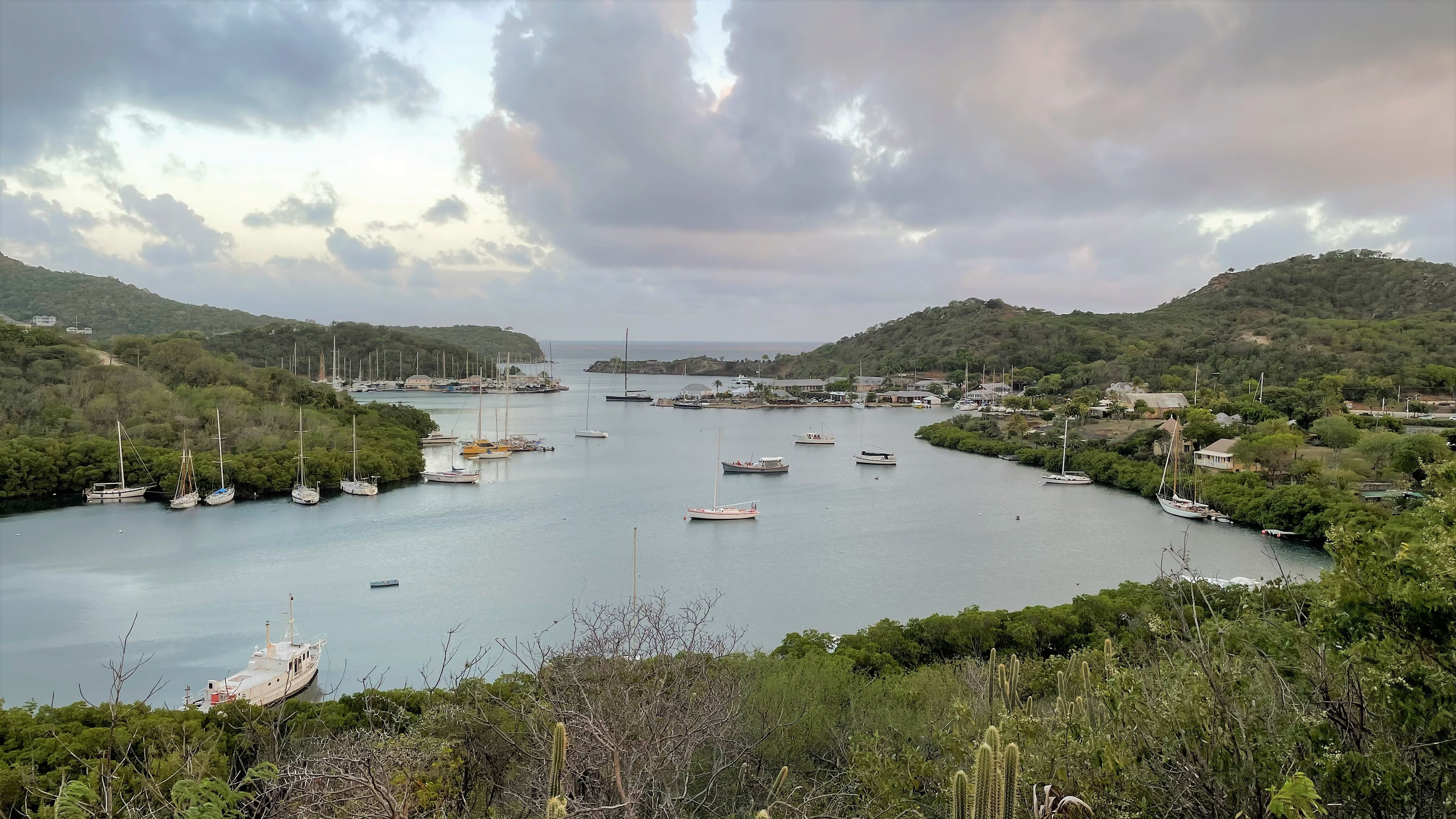
View of English Harbour

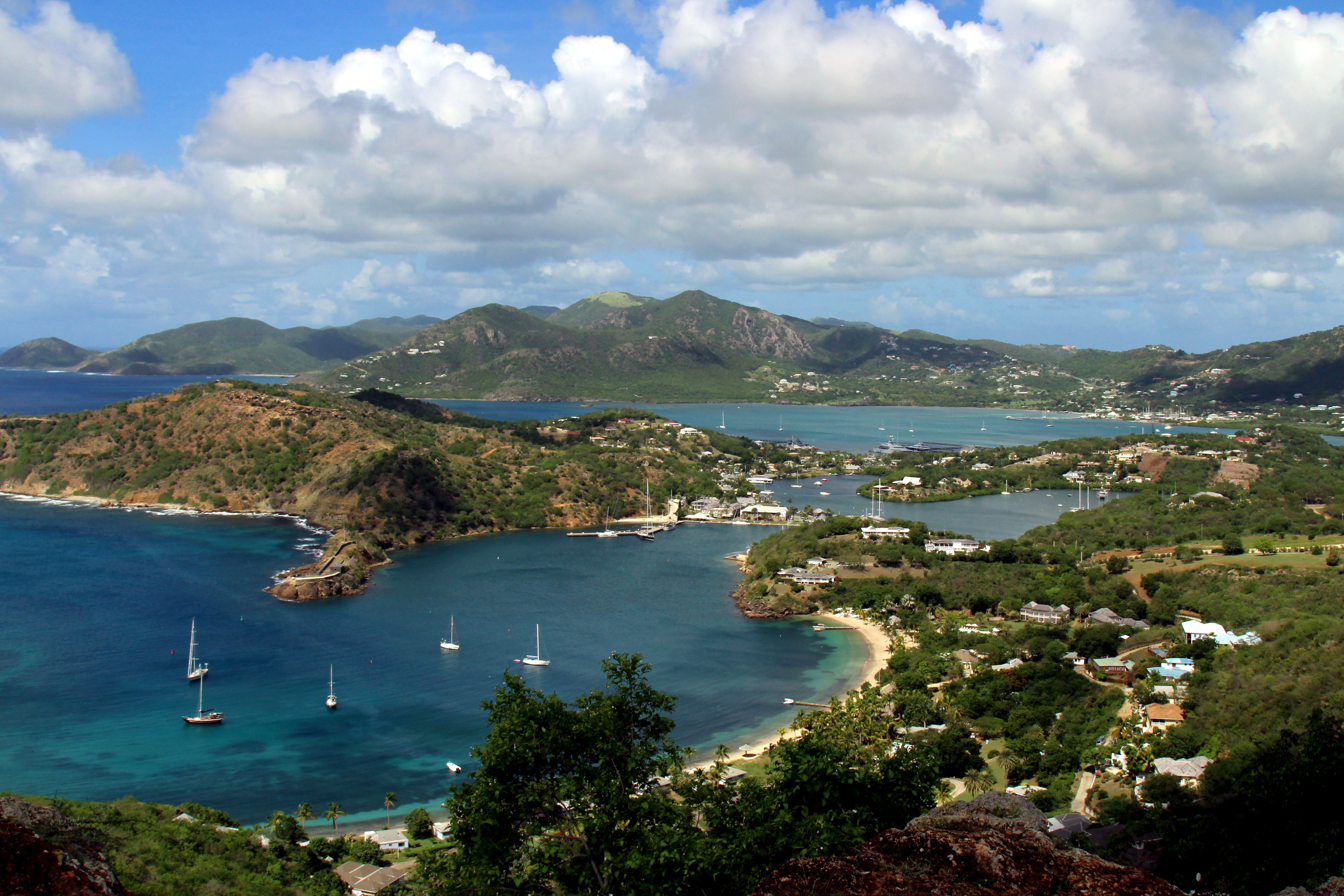
View of English Harbour's entrance
