= Ordnance Bay =

- Bay and populated place
- Location within Antigua
- Coordinates: 17°00′49.6″N 61°45′59.3″W
- Country: Antigua and Barbuda
- Island: Antigua
- Parish: Saint Paul
- Major division: Major Division of English Harbour
- Enumeration district: 71900

Population (2011)
  - Total: 184

Ordnance Bay is a bay and populated place in English Harbour.

== Demographics ==
Ordnance Bay has one enumeration district, ED 71900.

Ethnic Data
Q48 Ethnic	Counts	%
African descendent	141	76.88%
Caucasian/White	19	10.40%
Mixed (Black/White)	2	1.16%
Mixed (Other)	12	6.36%
Hispanic	1	0.58%
Other	5	2.89%
Don't know/Not stated	3	1.73%
Total	184	100.00%

Religion Data
Q49 Religion	Counts	%
Anglican	57	31.76%
Baptist	1	0.59%
Jehovah Witness	3	1.76%
Methodist	70	38.82%
Moravian	7	4.12%
None/no religion	3	1.76%
Pentecostal	18	10.00%
Rastafarian	2	1.18%
Roman Catholic	8	4.71%
Other	5	2.94%
Don't know/Not stated	4	2.35%
Total	180	100.00%
NotApp :	3	

Country of birth
Q58. Country of birth	Counts	%
Africa	1	0.58%
Antigua and Barbuda	141	76.88%
Other Caribbean countries	1	0.58%
Other European countries	5	2.89%
Dominica	1	0.58%
Dominican Republic	1	0.58%
Guyana	1	0.58%
Jamaica	4	2.31%
St. Kitts and Nevis	2	1.16%
St. Lucia	1	0.58%
St. Vincent and the Grenadines	3	1.73%
United Kingdom	6	3.47%
USA	8	4.62%
USVI United States Virgin Islands	1	0.58%
Not Stated	5	2.89%
Total	184	100.00%

Country of Citizenship
Q71 Country of Citizenship 1	Counts	%
Antigua and Barbuda	162	88.44%
Dominica	1	0.58%
Dominican Republic	1	0.58%
Guyana	1	0.58%
Jamaica	2	1.16%
United Kingdom	1	0.58%
USA	5	2.89%
Other countries	5	2.89%
Not Stated	4	2.31%
Total	184	100.00%

Country of Second Citizenship
Q71 Country of Citizenship 2	Counts	%
Other Caribbean countries	7	22.58%
Other Asian and Middle Eastern countries	1	3.23%
Jamaica	2	6.45%
St. Lucia	1	3.23%
St. Vincent and the Grenadines	4	12.90%
United Kingdom	7	22.58%
USA	8	25.81%
Other countries	1	3.23%
Total	33	100.00%
NotApp :	151	
