= Shirley Heights, Antigua and Barbuda =

Historic military compound in Antigua

Coordinates: 17.001°N 61.751°W

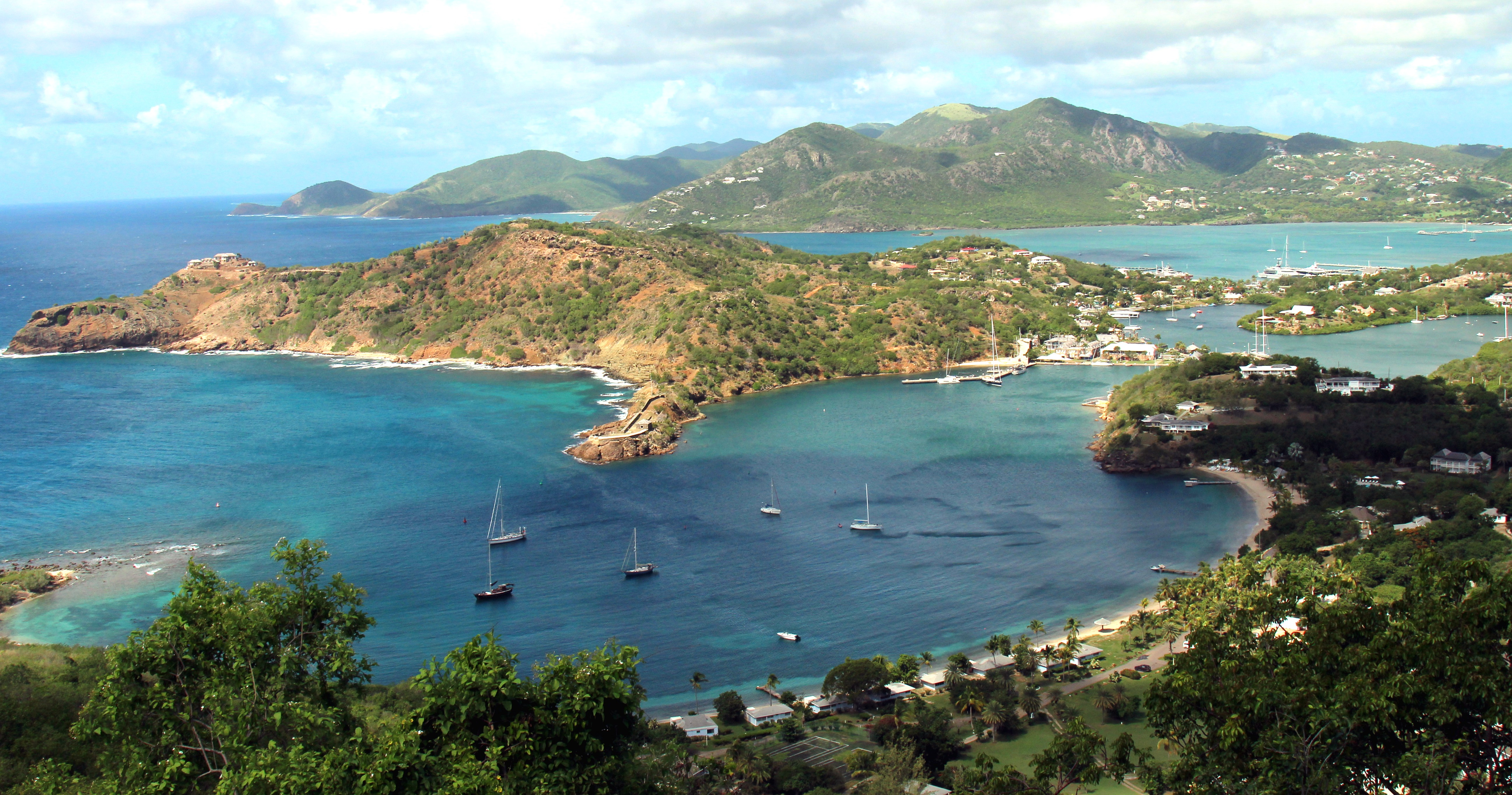
View of English Harbour from Shirley Heights

Shirley Heights is an historic military compound in Dow Hill, Antigua. It was built in the 1780s to protect the Naval Dockyard in English Harbour. It is part of Nelson's Dockyard National Park and part of a UNESCO World Heritage Site.

== History ==
In 1781, Thomas Shirley, recently appointed Governor of the Leeward Islands, urged the local government to fortify the area around and above English Harbour in order to protect the naval Dockyard. By 1788, construction had begun on and around the area known as The Ridge, which overlooked the harbour. The military compound built there became known as Shirley Heights.

Between 1781 and 1825, more than 50 structures were built at Shirley Heights. These included a fort (Fort Shirley) with barracks, officers' quarters, powder magazines, guard house, signal station, canteen, and cemetery. The Antiguan government funded construction of Shirley Heights through 1790, after which they refused to continue financing the project. From 1790, the British government funded the completion of the construction, due to growing fears of an attack by the French.

In 1803, 700 men on 13 schooners were sent from Guadeloupe to attack Antigua. Their attack was unsuccessful, as they were defeated by a British frigate. This was the only attack on Antigua by the French. After Napoleon's defeat in 1814, use of the compound and the dockyards below was scaled back.

Shirley Heights accommodated troops through the 1850s. In the 1830s, Fort Shirley was garrisoned by the 86th Regiment, who were replaced by 180 soldiers of the 36th Foot in 1833. In 1854, the last regiment left for reassignment in Trinidad. There is evidence that some of the remaining facilities were used in the 1920s as an asylum. Since then, all of the structures fell into ruin, although restoration efforts have taken place in the late 20th and early 21st century.

In 1984, Shirley Heights became part of Nelson's Dockyard National Park. In 2016, it became part of a UNESCO World Heritage Site, as UNESCO recognized the English Harbour dockyard and the surrounding military archaeological sites together as The Antigua Naval Dockyard and Related Archaeological Sites.

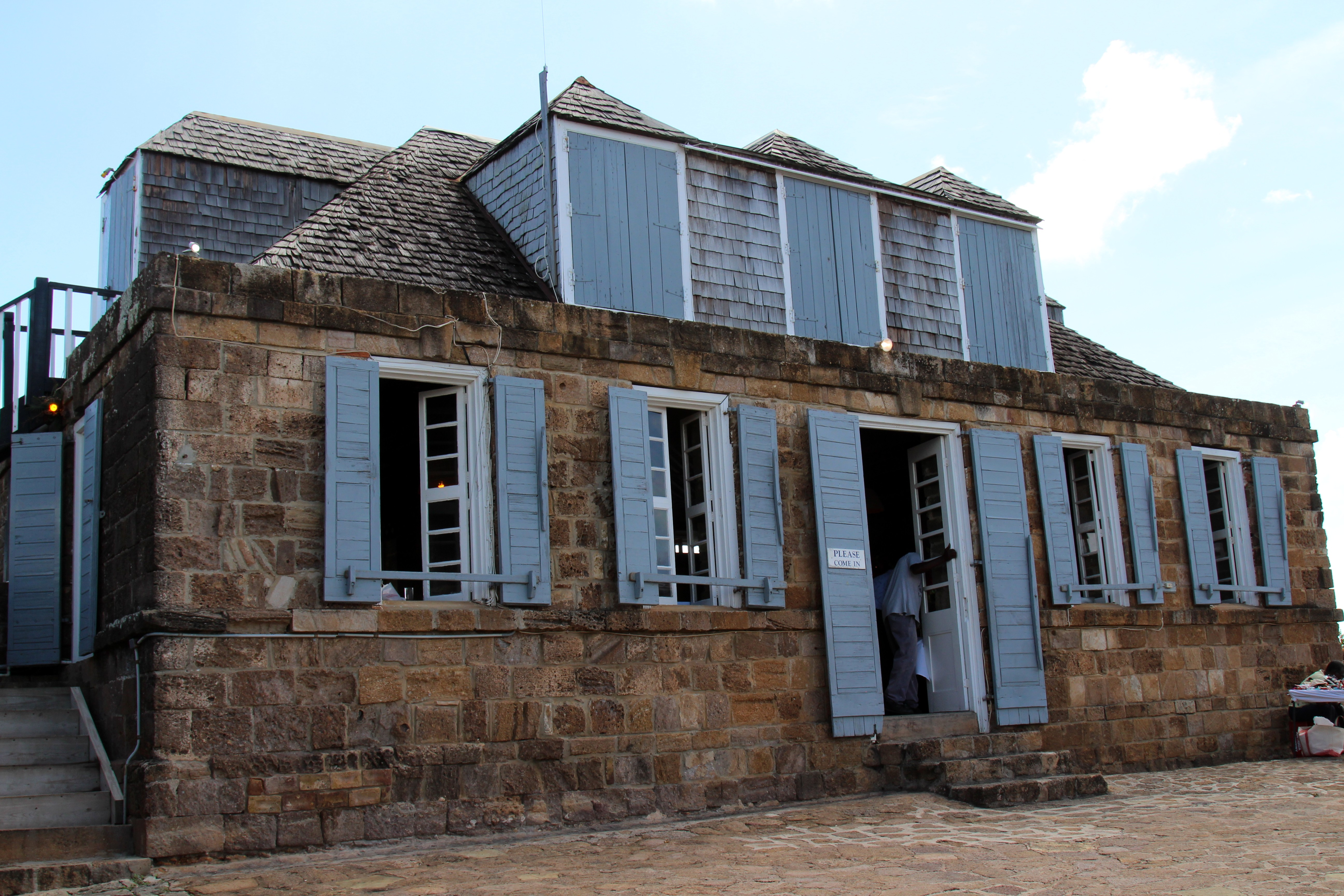
Restored lookout building at Shirley Heights

== Restoration ==
Some stabilization efforts have been undertaken at Shirley Heights. In 2010 and 2011, the Blockhouse was stabilized. In the 1980s, the military lookout buildings overlooking English Harbour were restored and turned into a restaurant. The restaurant, called Shirley Heights Lookout Restaurant, is known for the event it hosts for locals and tourists every Sunday, with live music along with food and drinks.
