= Nelson's Dockyard =

Cultural heritage site and marina on Antigua in Antigua and Barbuda

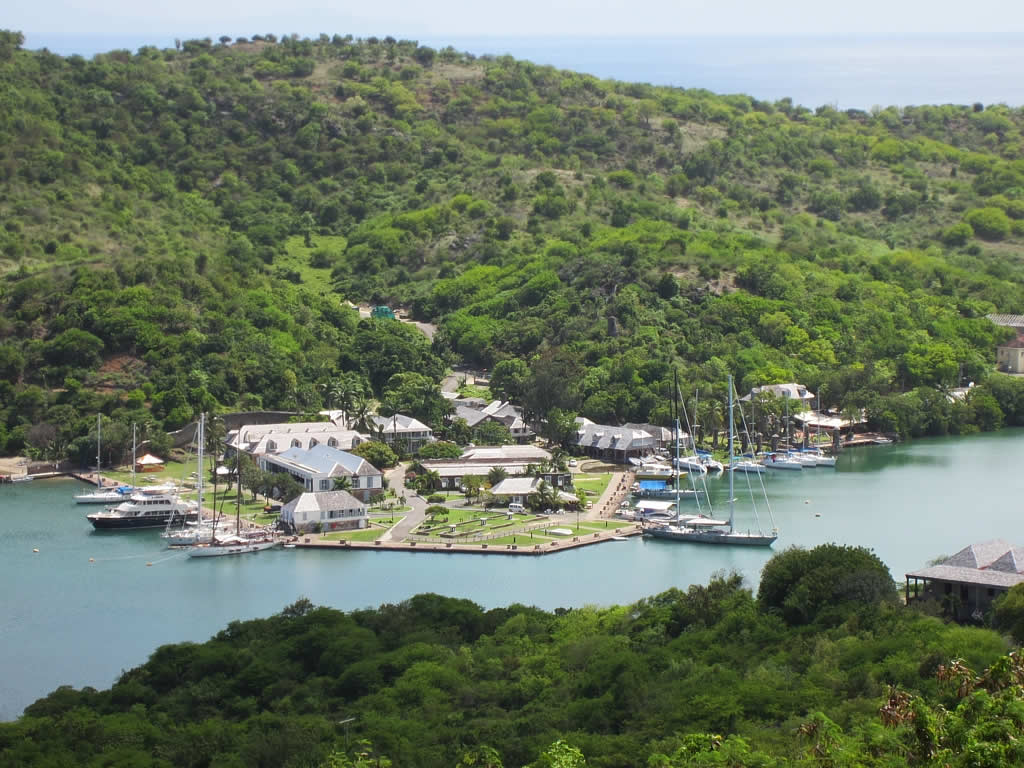
Nelson's Dockyard in English Harbour

Nelson's Dockyard is a cultural heritage site and marina in English Harbour, located in Saint Paul on the Caribbean island of Antigua, in Antigua and Barbuda. It is the only continuously working Georgian era dockyard in the world. It was built in the early 18th century and abandoned by the British Royal Navy in 1889. The dockyard is named after Admiral Horatio Nelson, who lived in the Royal Navy Dockyard from 1784 through 1787.

Today, it is part of Nelson's Dockyard National Park and the Antigua Naval Dockyard and Related Archaeological Sites UNESCO World Heritage Site. It is also home to some of Antigua's sailing and yachting events such as Antigua Sailing Week, the Antigua Classic Yacht Regatta, and the Antigua Charter Yacht Meeting, as well as the North American Optimist Championships.

== History ==
=== English Harbour ===
After the English colonized Antigua in 1632, the Royal Navy began using English Harbour as a safe haven. The harbour's position on the south side of Antigua island facilitated the monitoring of neighbouring islands, and the harbour was naturally well-suited to protect ships and cargo from hurricanes. Fortification of the harbor began in the 18th century.

The first reference to the defense of English Harbour occurs in 1704, when Fort Berkeley was listed as one of the island's forts established around the coast of Antigua. Fort Berkeley was built on a peninsula at the entrance to English Harbour. By 1707 naval ships used English Harbour as a station, but no facilities had yet been built for ship maintenance or repair.

By 1723 English Harbour was in regular use by British naval ships and in September of that year the harbour gained a reputation as a safe natural harbour when a hurricane swept ashore 35 ships lying in other ports in Antigua, while HMS Hector and HMS Winchelsea, both moored in English Harbour, suffered no damage. Soon British naval officers petitioned for the building of repair and maintenance facilities in English Harbour.

In 1725, the English Harbour became a focal point for the establishment of a naval base. The first dockyard, St. Helena, was built on the eastern side of the harbour. It consisted of a capstan house for careening ships, a stone storehouse, and three wooden sheds for the storage of careening gear. There were no quarters for dockyard staff or visiting sailors and the seamen themselves conducted all work and repairs on the ships. Naval operations in English Harbour soon outgrew the small original dockyard, and plans were begun in 1743 to develop the western side of the harbour with more facilities.

=== Naval Dockyard construction ===
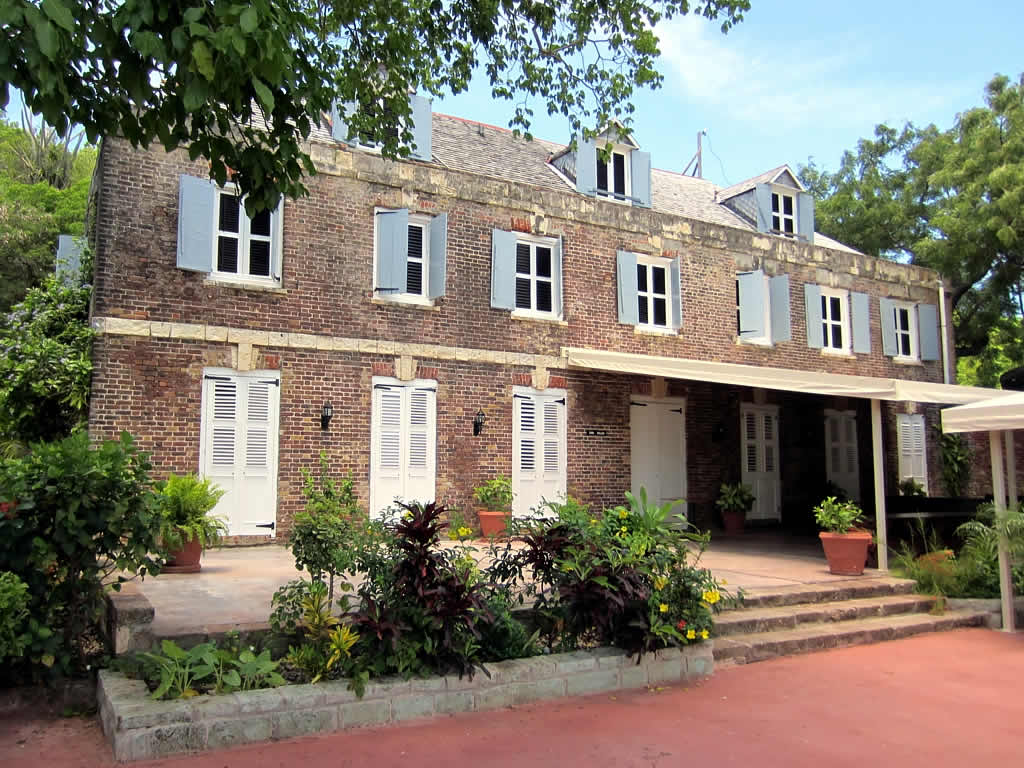
Admiral's Inn (the former Pitch and Tar Store)

Construction of the modern Naval Dockyard began in the mid-1740s, on the western side of English Harbour. Enslaved Africans from plantations in the vicinity were sent to work on the dockyard.

By 1745 a line of wooden storehouses had been constructed (on the site of the present-day Copper and Lumber Store Hotel). During this time, land was reclaimed for the construction of wharves. Between 1755 and 1765, many additional buildings were added: quarters were built for the Commander-in-Chief (Thomas Shirley), additional storerooms, a kitchen, a shelter for the Commander's “chaise”, and the first part of the present Saw Pit Shed. During this time, a stone wall was built around the Dockyard, and land reclamation for wharves continued.

Additional construction took place between 1773 and 1778: the Engineer's Workshop, the Guard House, the Porter's Lodge, the two Mast Houses, and the Capstan House were constructed; the first bay of the Canvas, Cordage, and Clothing Store was built; the walls around the Dockyard were extended to their present-day position; and the first naval hospital was constructed outside the Dockyard. By 1780, the dockyard also had boathouses, a water catchment, and a galley.

Many of the buildings in the Dockyard today were constructed during a building programme undertaken between 1785 and 1794. The Engineer's House and the Pitch and Tar Store were built in 1785. The Engineer's Offices were built (and the Dockyard wall was extended to include them) in 1788. The wharves were improved and the northern side of the Saw Pit Shed was built in the same year. The Copper and Lumber Store was completed in 1789, and by 1792 the west side of the Canvas, Cordage, and Clothing Store had been completed. The Blacksmith's Shop also dates from this period. This building programme overlaps with Horatio Nelson's tenure in the Dockyard from 1784 to 1787.

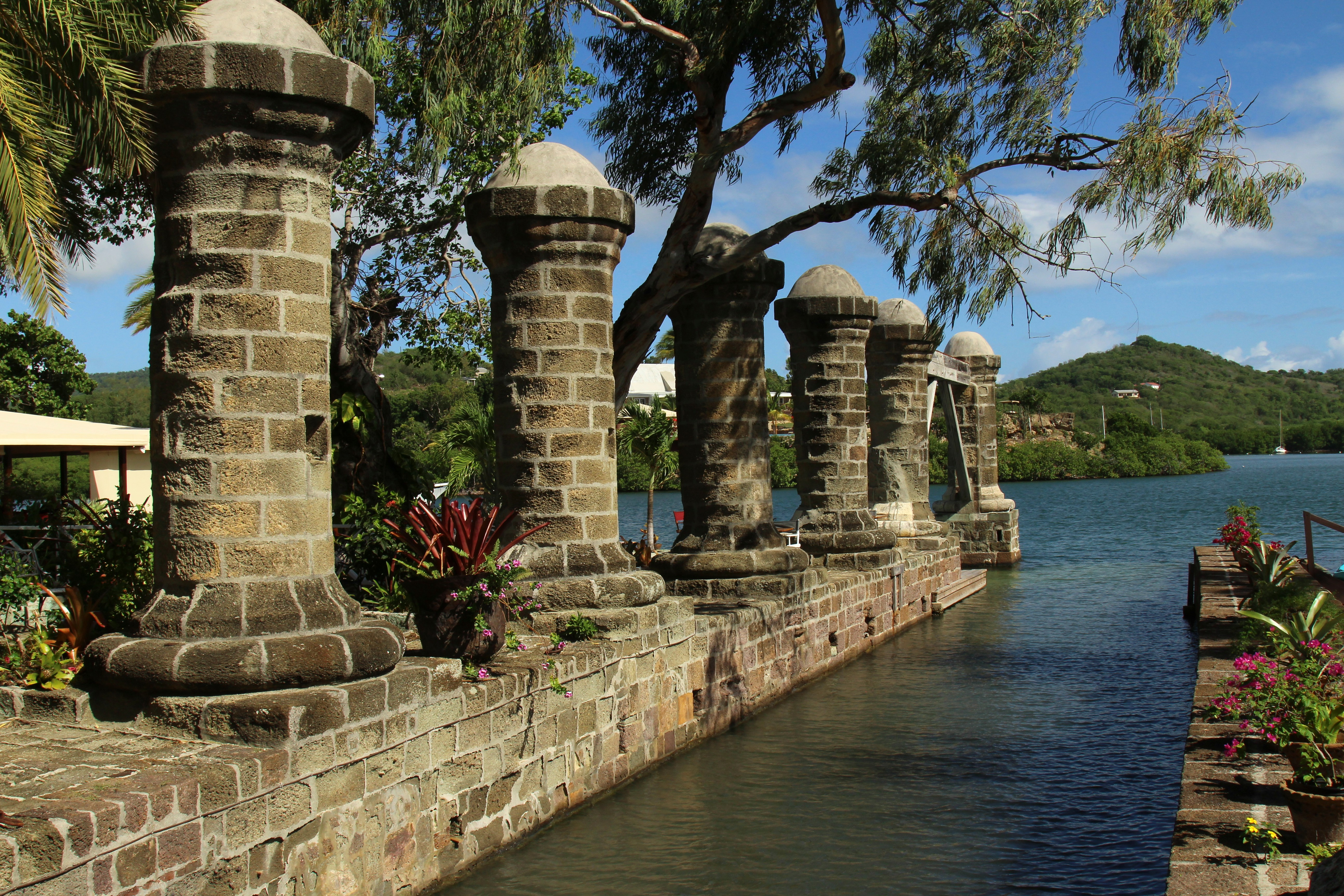
Pillars of former Boat House & Sail Loft

In 1797, the Sail Loft and Boat House were built (adjacent to the Engineer's Offices and Tar and Pitch Store); the pillars are still visible today. Around 1806, the Pay Master's Office was built and in 1821 the Officers’ Quarters building was constructed to accommodate the growing numbers of officers who accompanied their ships to the yard. The Naval Officer's and Clerk's House was built in 1855 and is now home to the Dockyard Museum.

In 1889 the Royal Navy abandoned the dockyard, and it fell into decay.

=== Restoration ===
The Society of the Friends of English Harbour began restoration of the dockyard in 1951, and in 1961 it was re-opened to the public. Among the original buildings are two hotels, a museum, craft and food shops, restaurants, and a large marina. Hiking trails radiate from the dockyard site into the surrounding Nelson's Dockyard National Park.

=== Media ===
On May 9, 1982, Duran Duran filmed music videos for their songs "Rio" and "(Waiting for the) Night Boat" in English Harbour and Nelson's Dockyard. In 2023, Nelson's Dockyard was featured on an episode of BBC's The Apprentice.

== Gallery ==
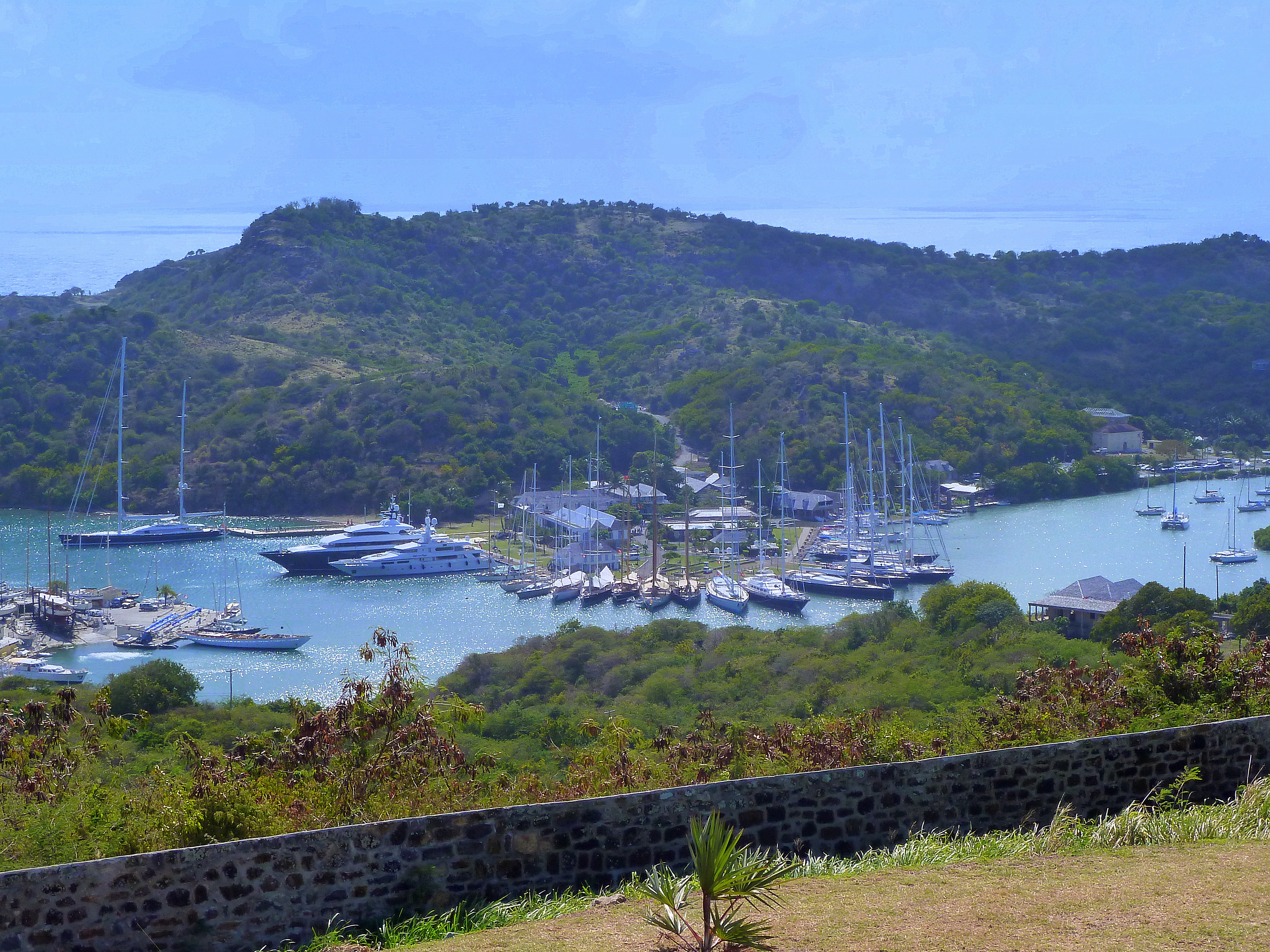
View of Nelson's Dockyard from Fort Hill

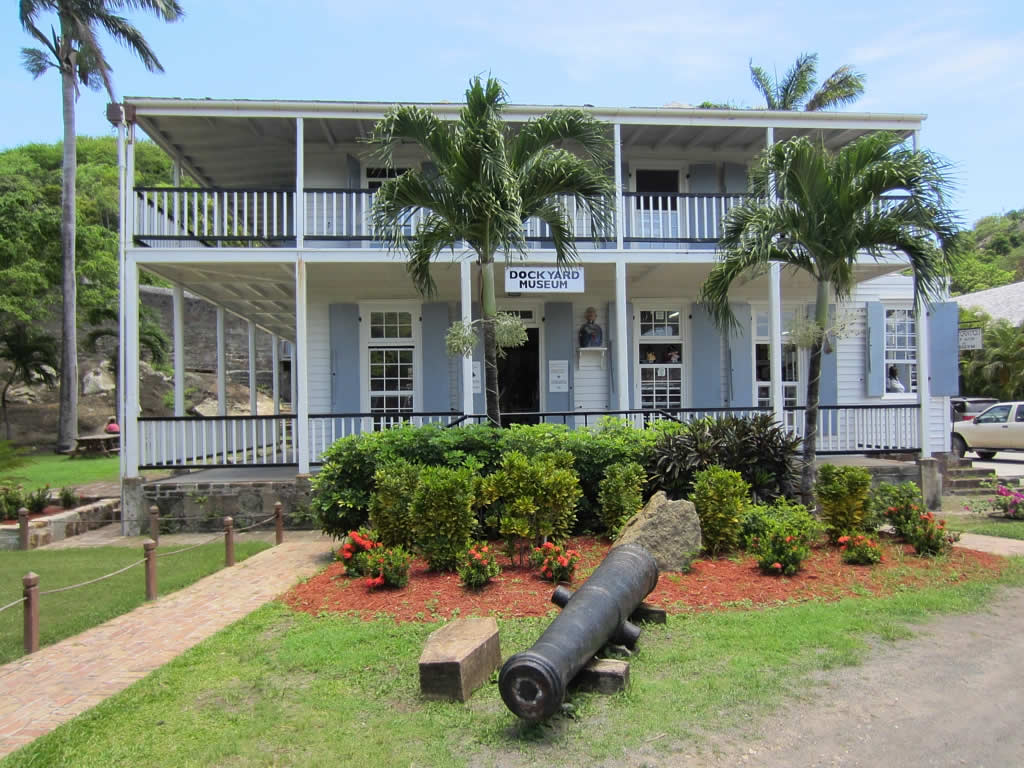
Former Naval Officer's House (now the Dockyard Museum)

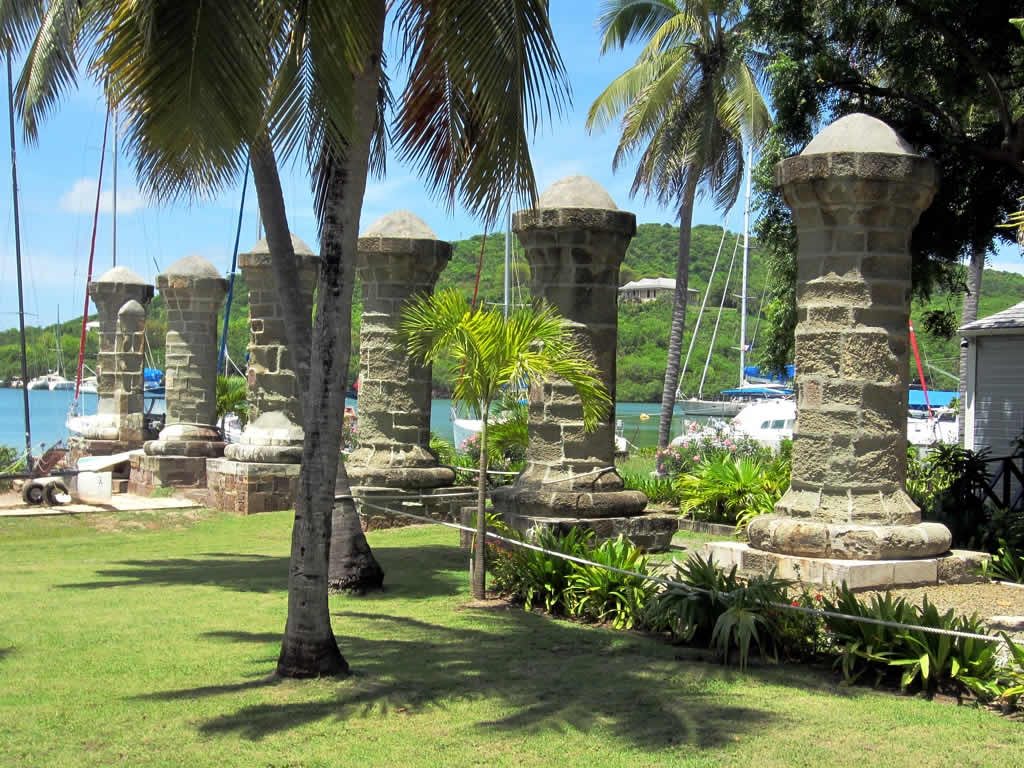
Remains of former Boat House & Sail Loft, which lost its roof in a hurricane in 1871

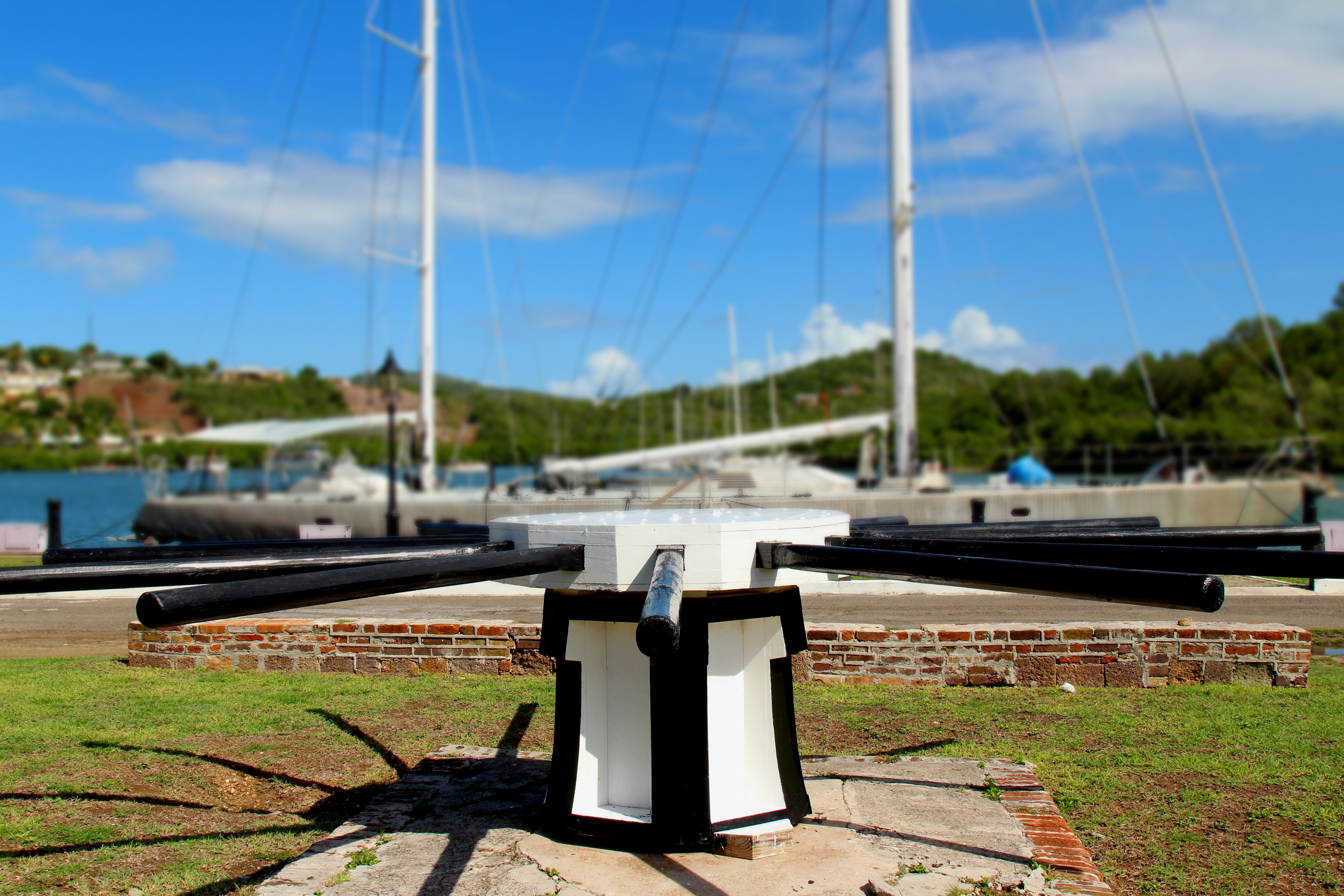
Capstan at Nelson's Dockyard marina

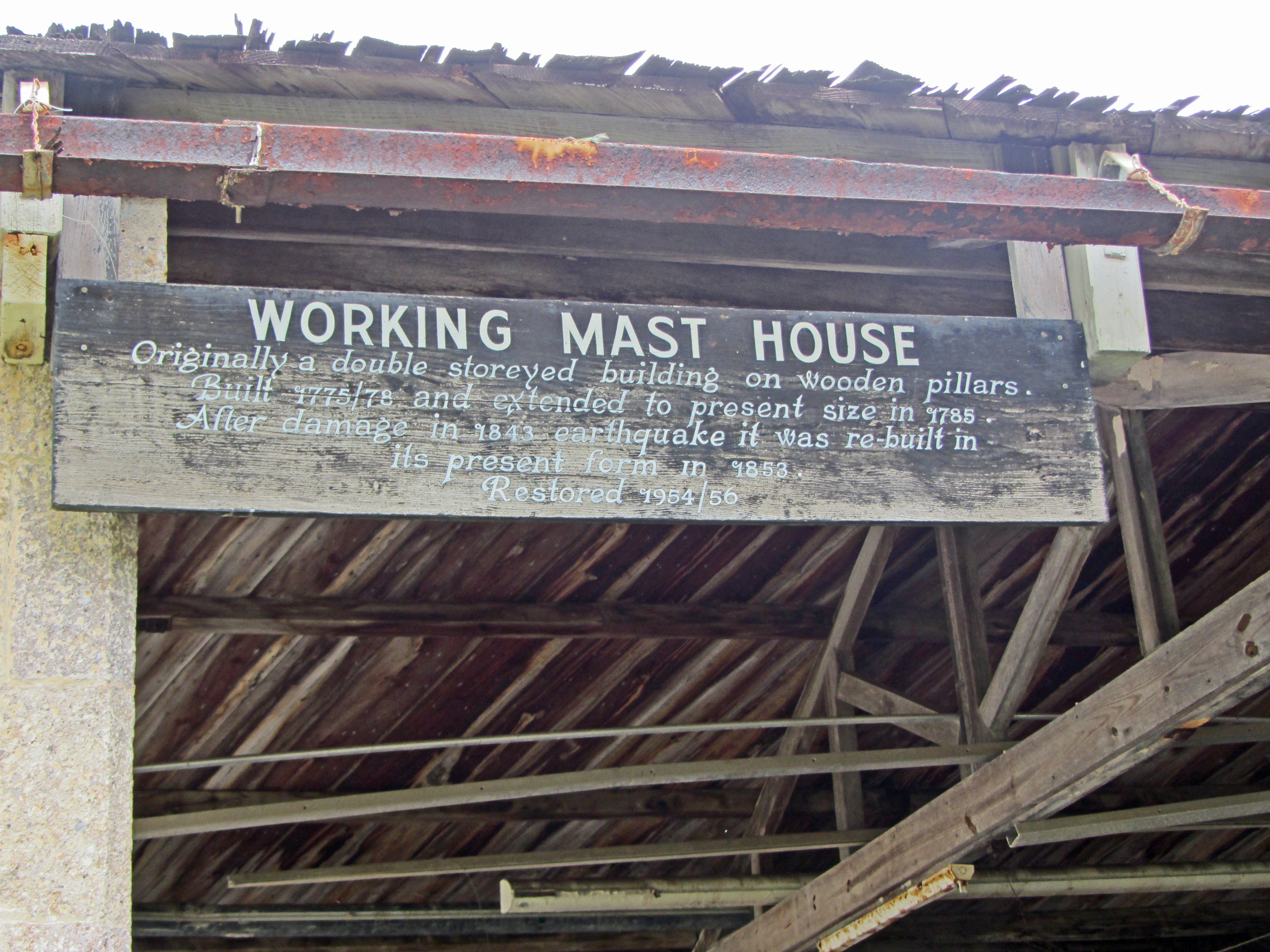
Mast House at Nelson's Dockyard

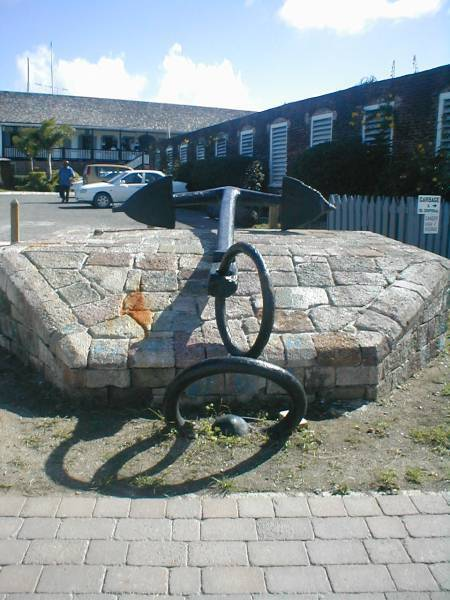
Ships anchor at Nelson's Dockyard, with the Officers' Quarters and Canvas, Cordage & Clothing Store behind

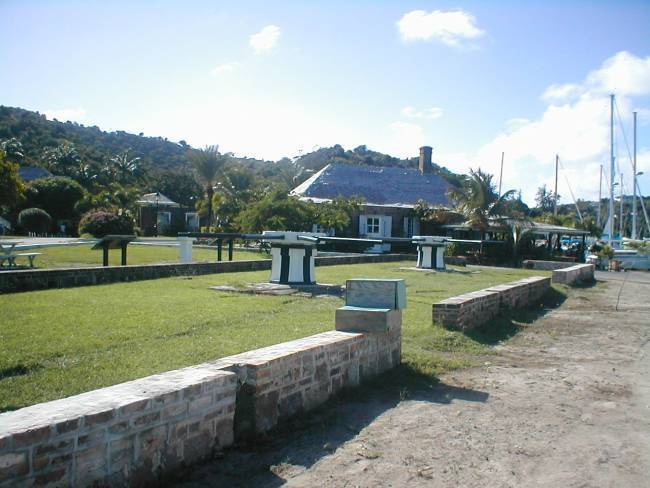
Nelson's Dockyard: capstans within the remains of the Capstan House, galley behind

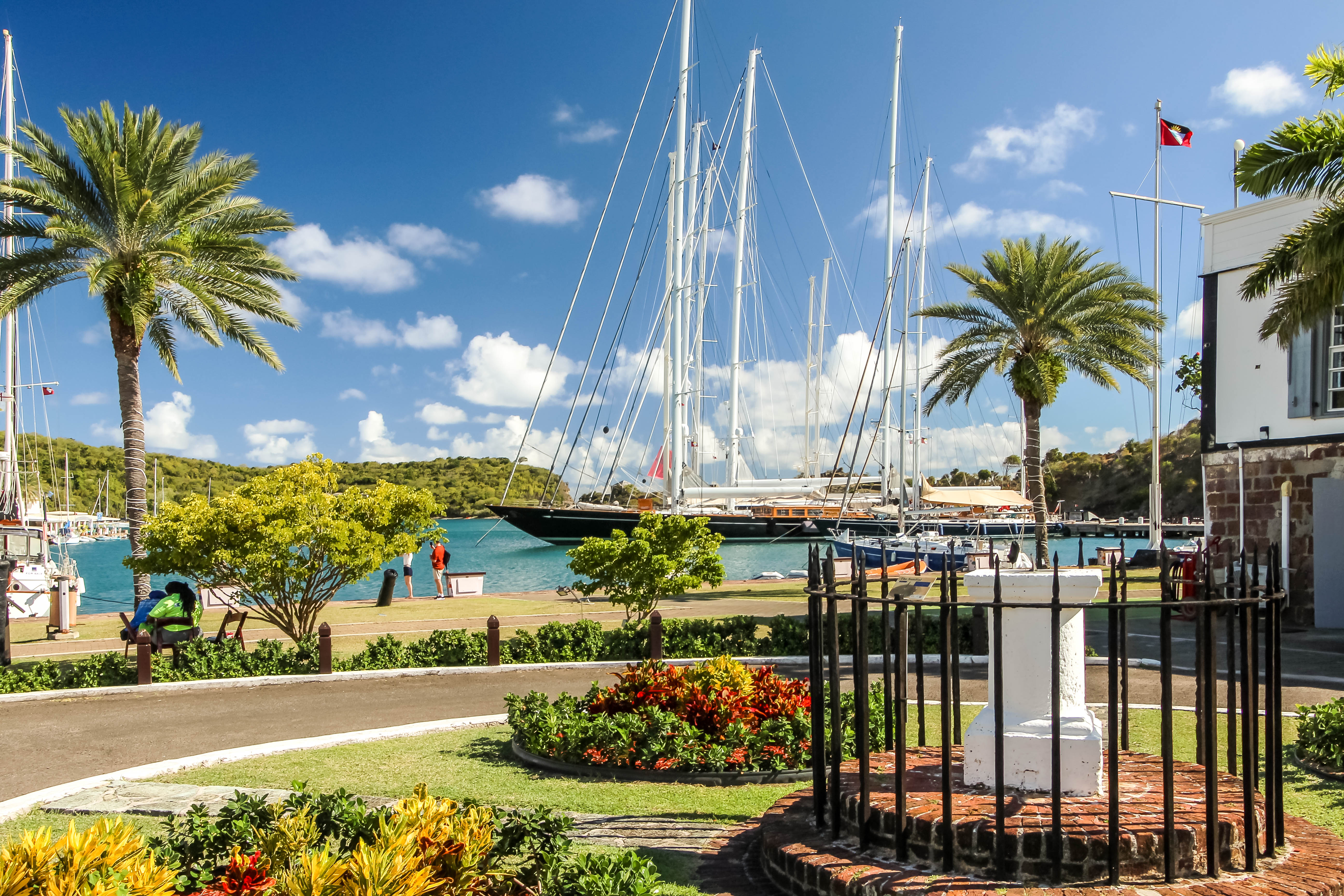
Nelson's Dockyard: view to Freemans bay

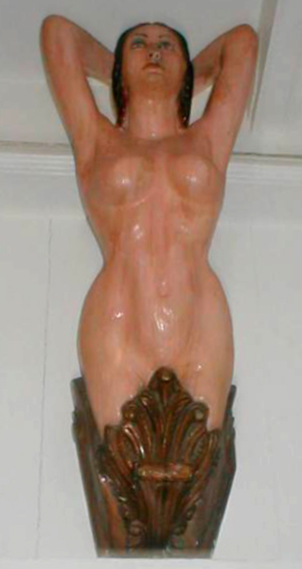
Figurehead at Nelson's Dockyard, Antigua

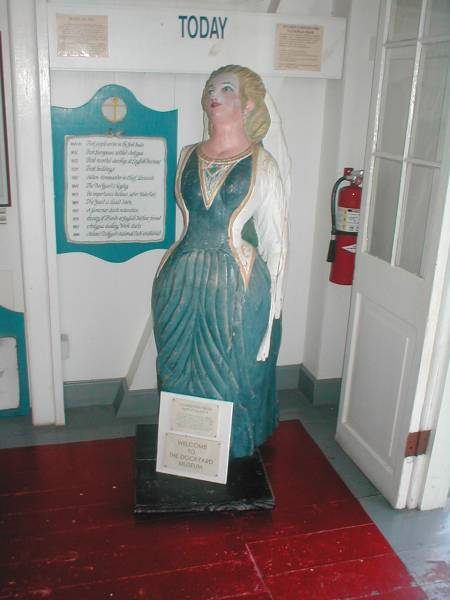
Figurehead at Nelson's Dockyard, Antigua

Entrance area

Main gate

Vendors' area

== See also ==
- English Harbour
- Antigua Naval Dockyard and Related Archaeological Sites
- Sir Thomas Shirley, 1st Baronet
- Dow's Hill Interpretation Centre
