= English Harbour =

English Harbour Inglish Aaba
- Town
- Town of English Harbour
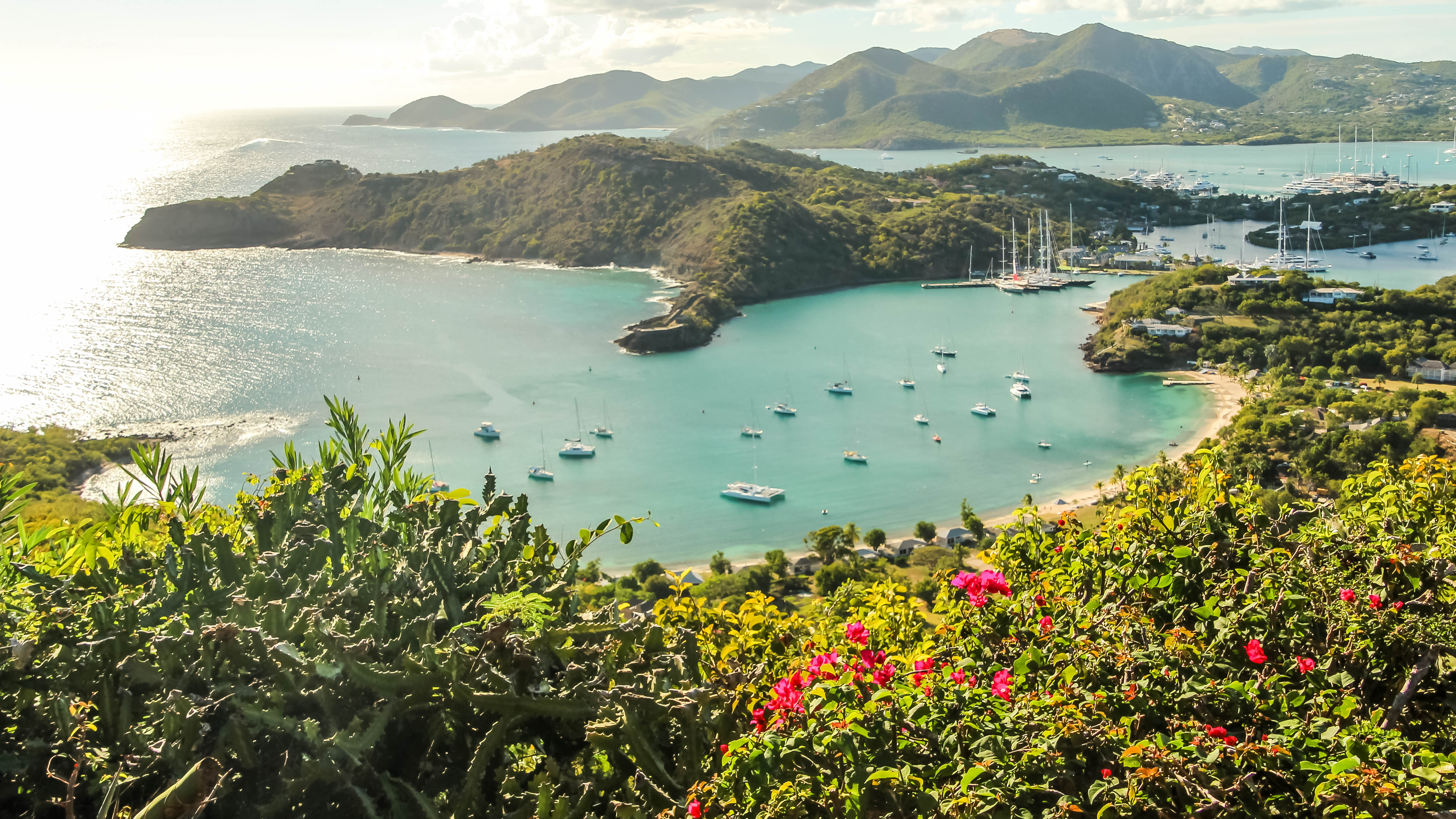
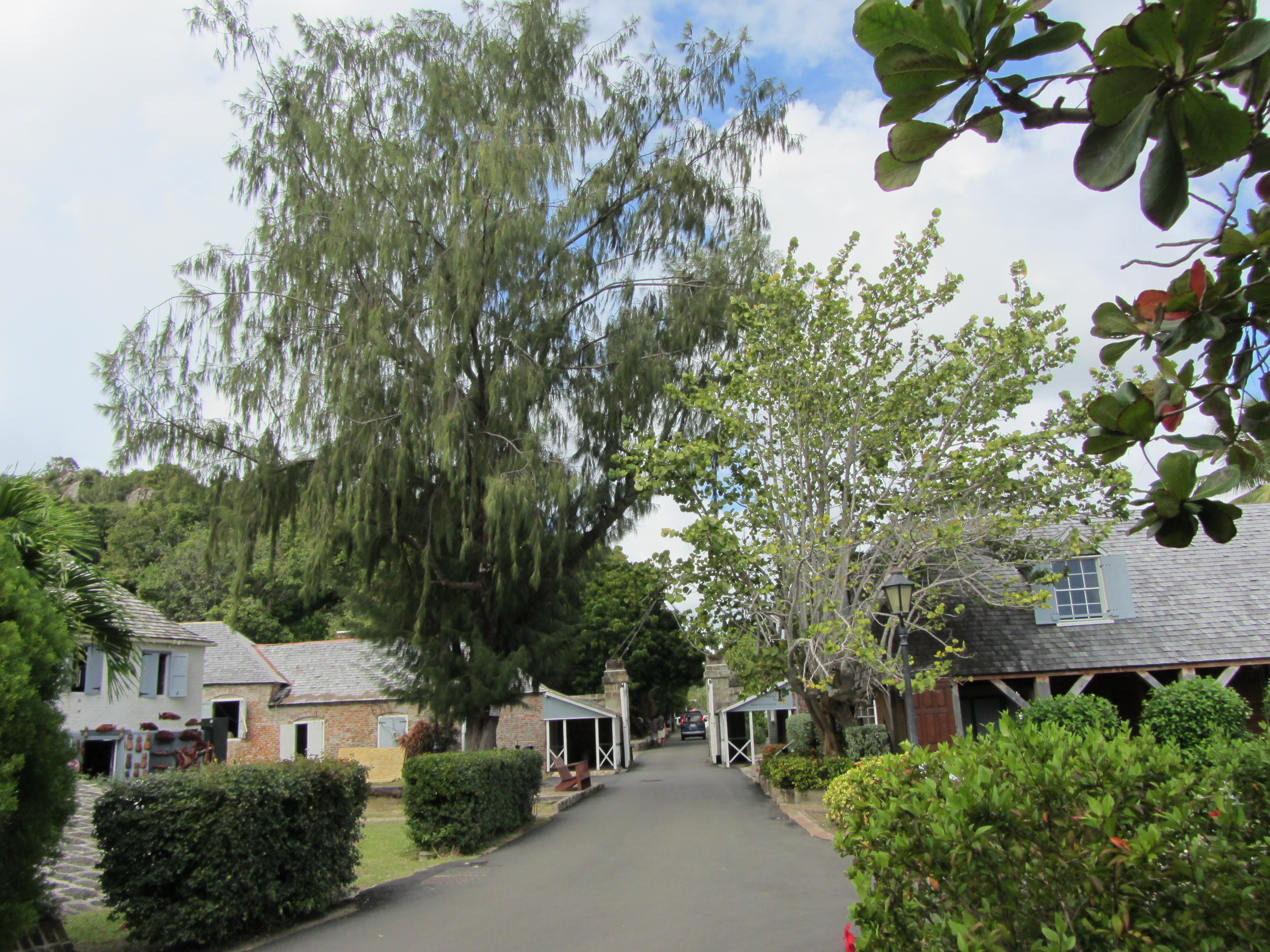
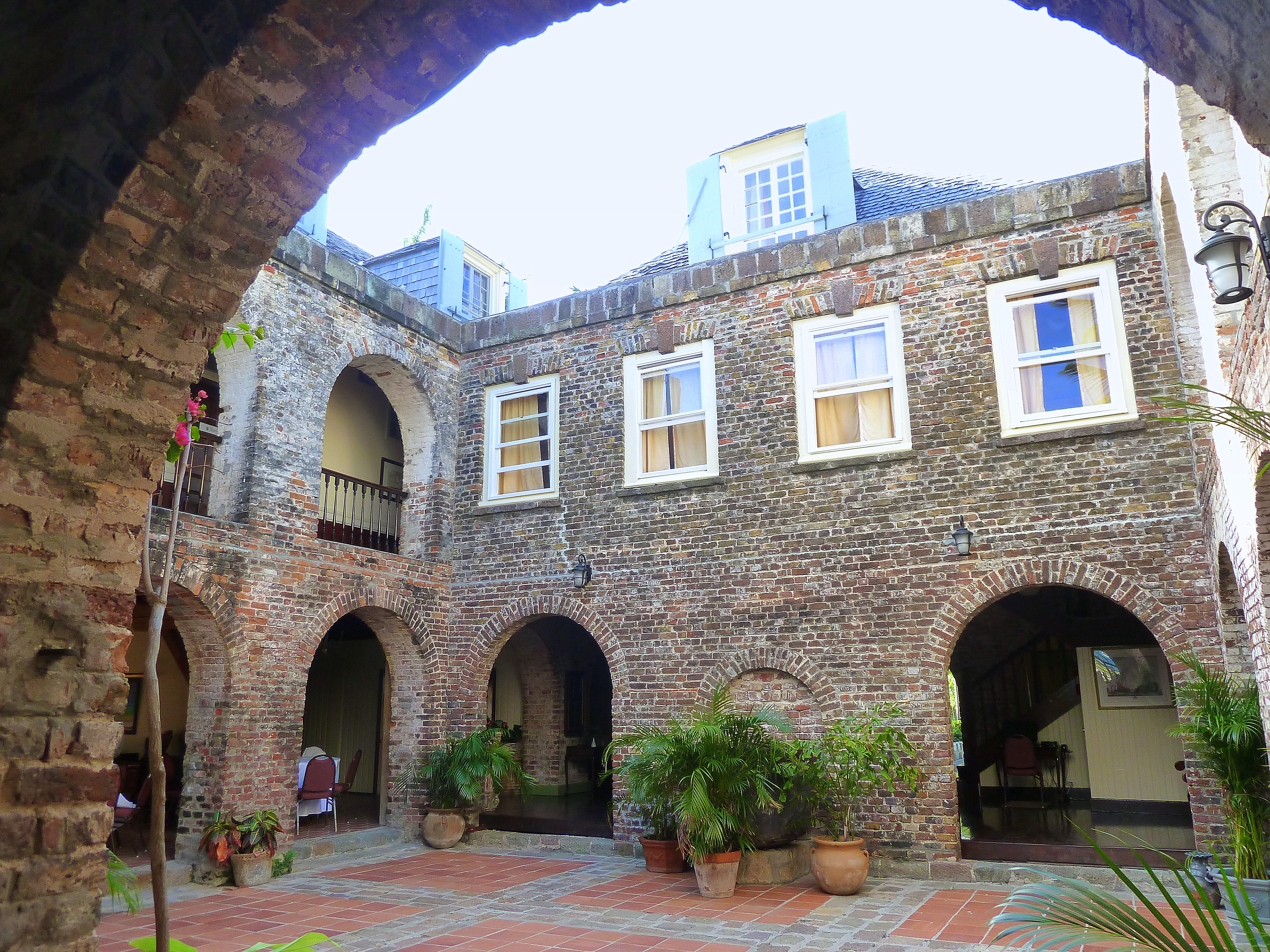
- (from top: left to right) English Harbour and Falmouth Harbour, a street scene, Copper and Lumber Store Historic Inn
- Interactive map of the English Harbour main place
- Location within Antigua
- Coordinates: 17°00′43.90″N 61°46′07.36″W
- Country: Antigua and Barbuda
- Island: Antigua
- Parish: Saint Paul

Government
  - MP: Paul Chet Greene

Area
  - Land: 1.72 km^{2} (0.66 sq mi)

Population (2011)
  - Total: 570
  - Density: 330/km^{2} (860/sq mi)
- Time zone: UTC-4 (AST)

English Harbour (North Antiguan: Inglish Aaba) (Note: /ɪŋ.ɡlɪʃ hɑːbə/; North Antiguan pronunciation: [ɪŋ.glɪʃ äːbə]) is a natural harbour and town on the island of Antigua in the Caribbean, in the extreme south of the island. The settlement takes its name from the nearby harbour in which the Royal Navy established its base of operations for the area during the eighteenth century. Its population is 570 (2011 census).

English Harbour is a centre of boating, especially yachting. There are two sheltered deepwater harbours nearby; English Harbour itself and Falmouth Harbour.

== Geography ==
English Harbour is located just south of the Central Plain near Matthews Road. The town officially covers an area of 1.72 square kilometres. Adjacent communities include Cobbs Cross, Marsh Village, and Dow Hill. The Middle Ground peninsula separates the two harbours of the town. Another neighbourhood is Ordnance Bay.

== Naval history ==
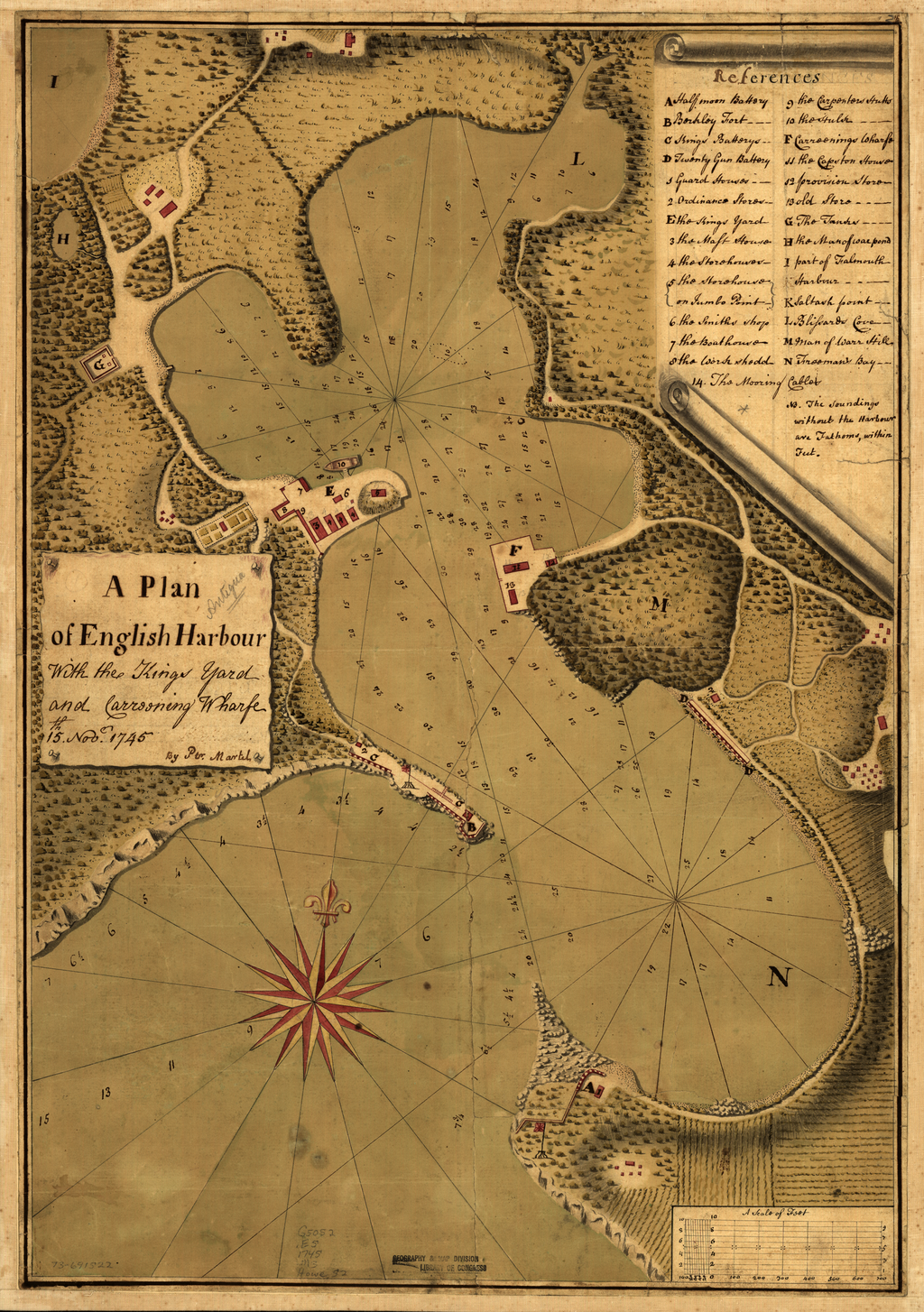
Map of English Harbour dated 1745

English Harbour is best known for Nelson's Dockyard, a former British Navy base; it displays restored 18th and 19th-century buildings and other historical artefacts from the colonial period of the dockyard, especially the time it was commanded by Horatio Nelson.

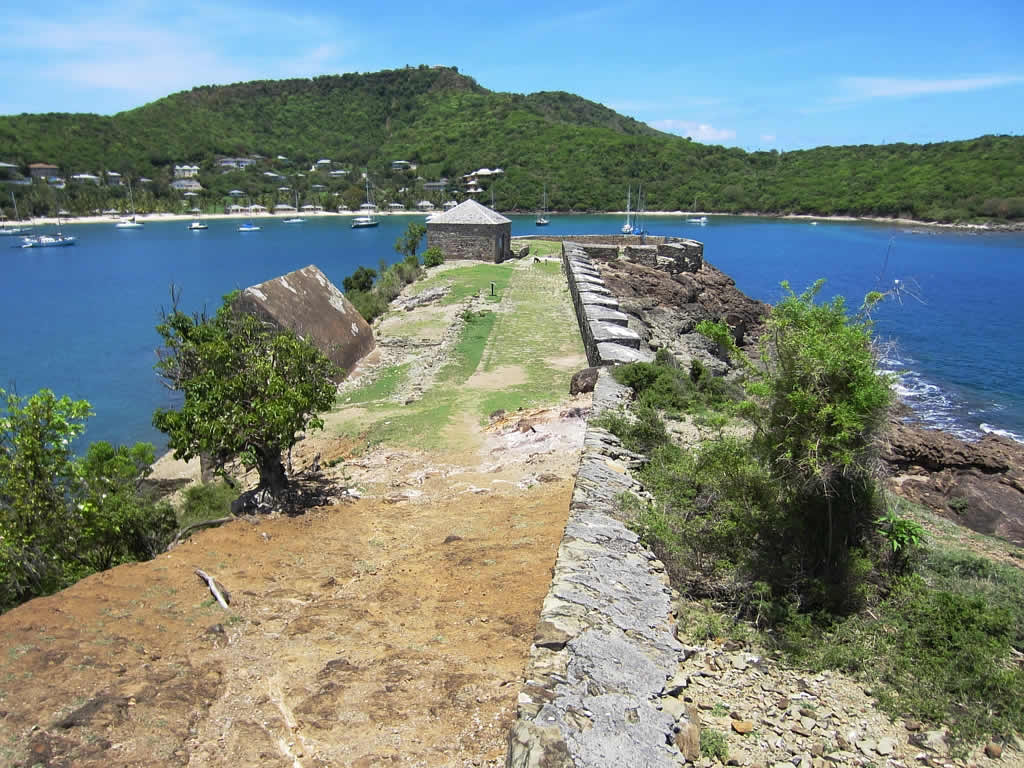
Fort Berkeley at the harbour entrance

The Royal Navy had begun using English Harbour as a safe haven in the 17th century. In 1704 Fort Berkeley was built on a spit across the harbour entrance to defend it.

The Antigua Legislature assigned English Harbour to the King for naval use in 1725, and included adjoining land in 1729. By 1745, the harbour was fortified. Captain Horatio Nelson arrived in July 1784 as the senior officer of the Northern Division of the West Indies Station, commanding HMS Boreas, until his departure in 1787. Nelson referred to the harbour as an "infernal hole," while the "residents of these Islands are Americans by connexion and by interest, and are inimical to Great Britain. They are as great rebels as ever were in America, had they the power to show it." Nelson was joined in Dec. 1786 by Captain His Royal Highness Prince Wiliam Henry, commanding HMS Pegasus.

HM Naval Yard, Antigua, began on the eastern side of the harbour (on the site presently occupied by the Antigua Slipways boatyard) in the 1730s. The Yard was expanded across the bay on the western side (on the site known today as Nelson's Dockyard) in the 1740s. Both sites remained in use over the following decades. Each at first consisted of careening wharves and storehouses; to these, other buildings were added over time. By the end of the Napoleonic Wars a substantial complex of facilities had been developed at English Harbour: in addition to the twin Dockyards, the Harbour accommodated a Victualling Yard, an Ordnance Yard (where the Gunpowder House Hotel now stands) and a Royal Naval Hospital. The Commissioner (the senior Navy Board official at the Dockyard) resided at Clarence House on a hillside overlooking the bay.

Governor Shirley drew up plans in 1782 to fortify the high ground to the east. Construction of Shirley Heights began in 1788 and proceeded until 1793. Fort Shirley was garrisoned by the 86th Regiment in the 1830s, replaced by 180 soldiers of the 36th Foot in 1833. The garrison was abandoned in 1854, making the harbour defenceless.

== Subsequent history ==
The Royal Mail Steam Packet Company used the harbour as a port of call from 1840 onwards.

After 1815 the dockyard decreased in importance. By the 1850s the eastern yard was being used as a coal store and the western yard was described as being in poor repair. Nevertheless, the yards remained open, finally closing in 1889. Sixty years later, the first moves were made toward preserving what became known as Nelson's Dockyard. Today it flourishes as a yachting centre as well as a historic monument, and is described as 'the only working Georgian dockyard in the world'. Much of the surrounding area is a National Park.

After the land was returned to the Antigua government in 1906, the harbour facilities fell into ruin. Governor Kenneth Blackburne is credited with launching the restoration program in 1951, which raised 40,000 British Pounds. This restoration drive was a consequence of a 1948 study by the Ministry of Works stating that the more important buildings were worth restoring, enabling the naval dockyard to become an attraction for island visitors in 1961.

In 2018, politicians urged local squatters to take advantage of plans to allow them to buy their plots of land for $1 if they had lived there for ten years or more.

== Demographics ==
Population census
Year	Pop.	±% p.a.
1856	986	—
1970	1,134	+0.12%
1991	614	−2.88%
2001	500	−2.03%
2011	570	+1.32%
Source: 1856 Census, 2001 Census, 1991 Census, 1970 Census

In 2011, English Harbour had a population of 570 spread across three enumeration districts. The largest ethnic group in the town were African descendants (82.68%), followed by whites (8.01%), other mixed (4.10%), other (1.68%), unknown (1.30%), Hispanics (1.12%), and mixed black/white (1.12%). There were slightly less immigrants than the national average, with 76.35% of the population being born in Antigua and Barbuda. Other countries of birth included the United States (4.84%), Jamaica (3.91%), the United Kingdom (3.54%), and Guyana (1.86%). Most residents were Protestant Christians, with some major religious groups being Methodists (35.27%), Anglicans (23.64%), Pentecostalists (7.50%), Roman Catholics (6.00%), and irreligious people (5.82%).

Most people in the town worked for private employers, with 8.80% being employed by the government and 5.60% by a statutory body. English Harbour is one of the most prosperous areas in the country, with a 2008 living conditions study showing similar living conditions to Seatons and Buckleys. English Harbour is considered to be a major regional service centre, and is one of the primary settlements in the Central Plain region. A 2008 internet penetration survey deemed the town to be upper low income.
