= Buckleys =

- Village
- A valley in the western part of the village, 2026
- Interactive map of the Buckley's main place
- Location within Antigua and Barbuda
- Coordinates: 17°04′10″N 61°48′47″W
- Country: Antigua and Barbuda
- Island: Antigua
- Parish: Saint John
- Division: St. John's

Area
  - Total: 4.9 km^{2} (1.9 sq mi)
- Elevation: 141 m (463 ft)

Population (2011)
  - Total: 801
  - Density: 160/km^{2} (420/sq mi)
- Time zone: UTC-4

Buckleys is a village in Saint John, Antigua and Barbuda. It is located in the foothills of the Shekerley Mountains adjacent to the Central Plain. In 2011, the village had a population of 801 people over 4.9 kilometres. It is located on Buckleys Main Road which connects it to Potters Village in the north and Swetes in the south. Bendals borders it to the west. The village formed following the emancipation of slaves in the 1830s and 1840s. It was named after a former sugar estate.

Today, the village includes several restaurants, churches, tourist attractions, and inns. It contains two schools, Buckleys Primary School and Island Academy.

== Geography ==
According to the National Bureau of Statistics, Buckleys has a total area of 4.9 square kilometres over three enumeration districts. There is diverse land usage in the village. In the north, land is mostly used for rough grazing and rural settlement. In the central part of the village, land is mostly used for rough grazing and citronella grass fields. In the south, land is mostly used for crop farming and citronella grass fields. The extreme south of the village is covered by the tropical forests of the Shekerley Mountains.

The village is located on the boundary between the volcanic and Central Plain Group geologic regions of Antigua. The village is at high risk for landslides and low risk for drought. The village has an elevation of 141 metres in its most populated area. It is located in the St. Claire soil series, which consists of heavy grey clays. It receives much rainfall and while it is located mostly in hilly terrain, drainage is relatively poor.

Buckleys is located about 2.2 kilometres east of Bendals, 3.1 kilometres south of Potters Village, 1.7 kilometres west of Clarkes Hill, and 2.8 kilometres north of Swetes. To the north, Buckleys borders St. Claire and Clarkes Hill, to the east it borders All Saints, to the south it borders Swetes and John Hughes, and to the west it borders Bendals. Buckleys is 8.1 kilometres from the nearest international air service at V. C. Bird International Airport and 6.3 kilometres from Downtown St. John's.

== History ==
Buckley's Estate was founded in the seventeenth century. In 1672, Elias Buckley was included in the will of John Bridges. A Colonel Buckley had earlier been involved in the 1660s conflicts of the Caribbean. The plantation was noted for its fertile soil and good rainfall and the village likely emerged after 1843 during the post-emancipation period. In 1843, a portion of the estate was sold by David Cranstaun to labourers which laid the foundation of the village. Today, the sugar mill of the estate continues to stand.

In 1856, the estate had a population of two men. The population of the village was not recorded in the 1856 census.

In January 1880, the estate's wall was 'washed away'. On 26 April 1880, the estate was listed for sale. In May 1880, a third-class road was listed as connecting Herberts to Swetes via Buckleys. In 1888, the village was listed as containing a mixed Anglican school.

On 10 October 1891, the estate was once again listed for sale.

On 20 December 1946, the Swetes-Buckleys-John Hughes village council was incorporated.

In the late 1950s, Buckleys Primary School was established.

By the 1970s, the village had absorbed the smaller community of Aberdeen. Starting with the 1984 general election, the village was apportioned into All Saints West.

In 1991, the village had a population of 455, and in 2001 it had a population of 655.

== Demographics ==
According to the 2011 census, Buckleys had a population of 801 people. Ethnic groups present in the village included Africans (92.41%), whites (1.93%), 'other mixed' (1.93%), East Indians (1.66%), unknown (0.97%), Syrian/Lebanese (0.41%), mixed black/white (0.28%), 'others' (0.28%), and Hispanics (0.14%). 77.24% of the population was born in Antigua and Barbuda, with other major countries of birth including the United States (4.55%), Guyana (4.41%), and Jamaica (3.31%). Of the population born in Antigua and Barbuda, 13.04% had lived abroad at some point in their life. Major religious groups in the village included Wesleyan Holiness (27.80%), Anglicans (12.86%), and Catholics (9.82%).

The 2011 census counted 256 households. Based on the main material of outer walls, popular construction materials for homes included concrete (40.23%), wood (30.47%), and concrete blocks (23.44%). 85.55% of homes had sheet metal roofs and 7.42% had concrete roofs.

== Features ==
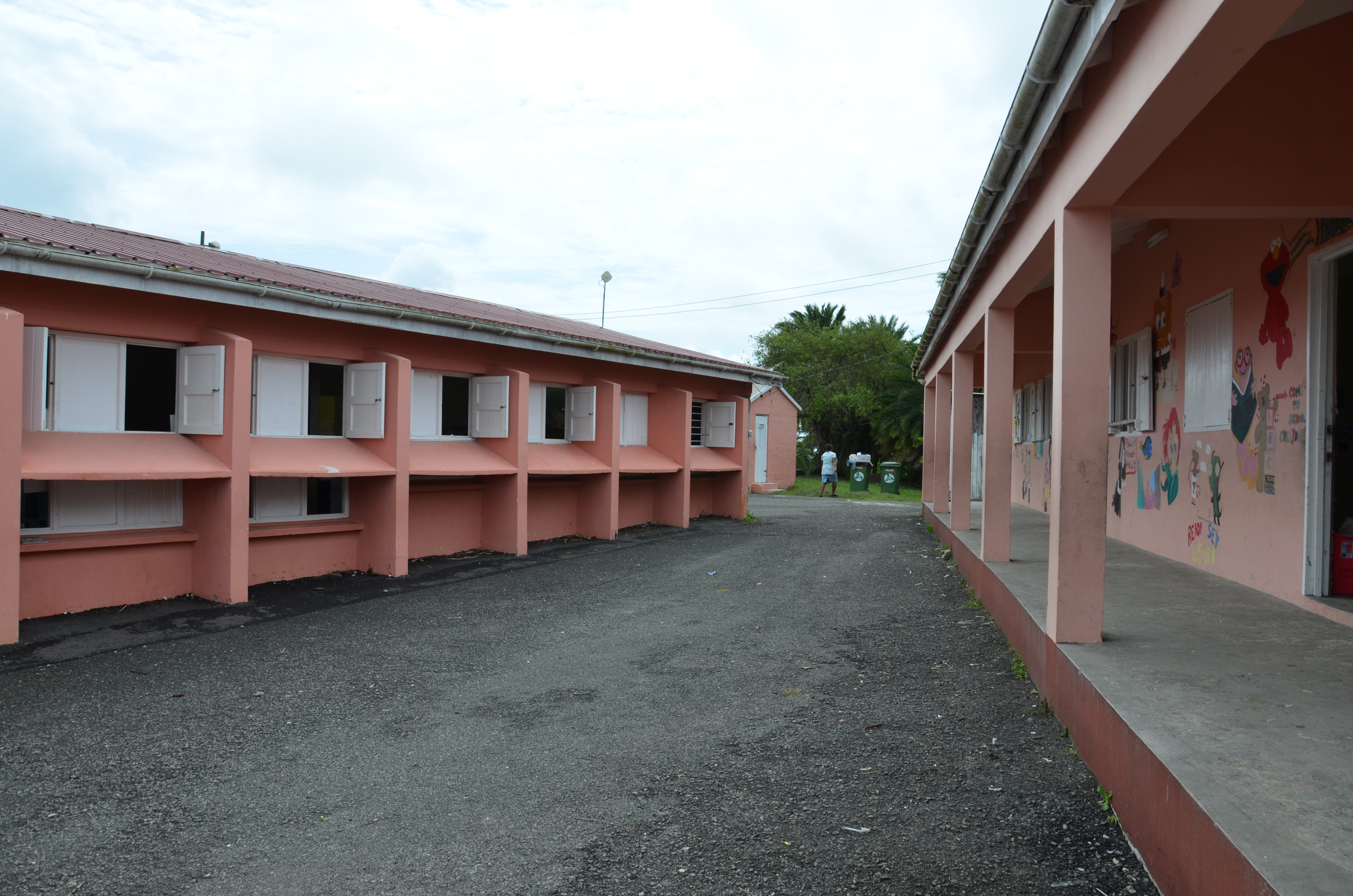
Buckleys Primary School in 2013

Buckleys can be accessed by Buckleys Main Road. The village has several churches, restaurants, schools, and inns.

Major churches in the village include the Seventh-day Adventist Church Buckleys and the Buckleys Wesleyan Holiness Church. The village has several restaurants and bakeries including Dan's Bar, Grill & Ice Cream Palor and Little Rock Confections. The office of Sweet Wadadli Jungle Rides is also located here.

There is an inn in the village, Mercy's Place.

Some of the Body Ponds are located in the west of the village as well as the foothills of the Shekerley Mountains.

There are two schools in the village, Buckleys Primary School and Island Academy, an international school.
