= Liberta, Antigua and Barbuda =

Village in Antigua

Liberta
- Village
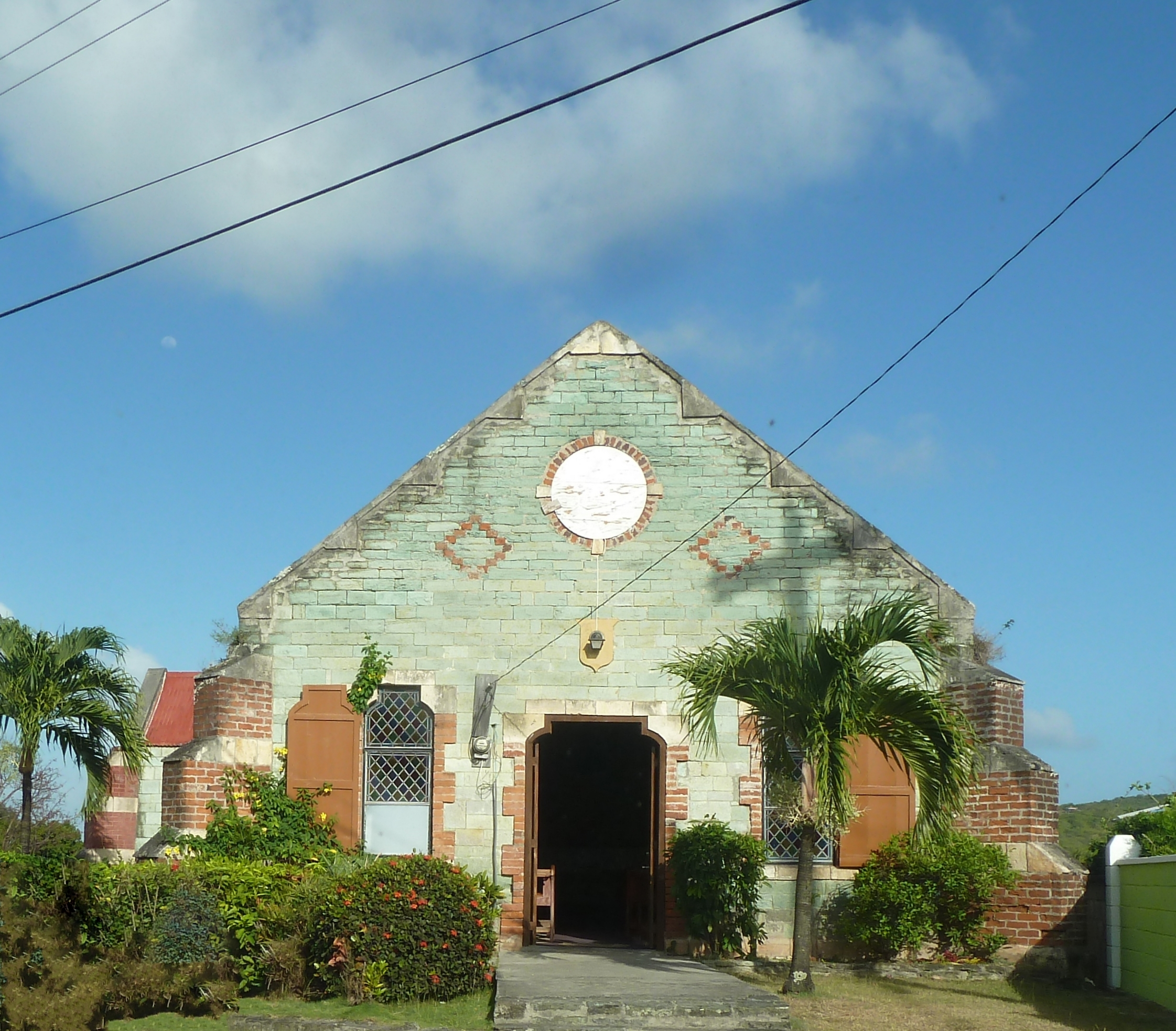
- St. Barnabas Anglican Church
- Interactive map of the Liberta main place
- Location within Antigua Location within Antigua and Barbuda Location within the Caribbean
- Coordinates: 17°2′31.99″N 61°47′42.32″W
- Country: Antigua and Barbuda
- Island: Antigua
- Parish: Saint Paul

Area
  - Total: 3.94 km^{2} (1.52 sq mi)
- Elevation: 64 m (210 ft)

Population (2011)
  - Total: 2,003
  - Density: 508/km^{2} (1,320/sq mi)
- Demonym: Libertan
- Time zone: UTC-4 (AST)

Liberta is a village located in Saint Paul, Antigua and Barbuda It had a population of 2,003 in 2011 over 3.94 square kilometres. Established in 1834 by freed slaves, it the fourth-largest village on Antigua. It is located in the southern part of the island, north of Falmouth Harbour and the port of Falmouth, to which it is connected by Matthews Road. Other nearby settlements include Swetes, Tyrells, and English Harbour. Liberta is one of the core locations of the Central Plain urban area.

== Geography ==
According to the National Bureau of Statistics, Liberta has a total area of 3.94 square kilometres over seven enumeration districts. The village overlooks Falmouth Harbour and is located on the foothills of the eastern Shekerley Mountains. The southwestern portion of the village is entirely covered by the mountains' rainforest. The eastern portion of the village is covered by dense rural settlement. The north of the village is mostly covered by agricultural land used for rough grazing. There are no significant ghauts or bodies of water in the village.

Liberta is located on the boundary between Antigua's volcanic suite and the Central Plain Group. The village is at moderate to high risk for landslides and low risk for drought. The village's primary school is located at an elevation of about 64 metres.

The village is about 2.1 kilometres northwest of Falmouth, 2 kilometres southeast of Swetes, 4 kilometres northwest of Nelson's Dockyard, and 1.9 kilometres southwest of Ras Freeman. The village borders Green Hill and Table Hill Gardens to the east, Pattersons to the southeast, Dieppe Bay to the south, John Hughes and Old Road to the west, and Swetes and Tyrells to the north. The main arterial road in Liberta is Matthews Road (Road 39), which links it to Falmouth and English Harbour southbound and Swetes and All Saints Road northbound. The village is about 12 kilometres from the nearest international air service at V. C. Bird International Airport.

== History ==
Around the time of the 19th century emancipation of slaves in British Antigua and Barbuda, a colonial plantation owner had financial troubles and was forced to sell off a part of her property in small lots. The ex-slaves in the neighbourhood bought up all the small freeholds, as they desired to own land in perpetuity. "Liberta", meaning liberty and honoring the freed people, became the settlement's name in 1835. By 1842, a painted signboard near its border read: "The Village of Liberta".

The new landowners immediately settled on the lots they had purchased, framed their houses, and cultivated their gardens. Besides working on nearby plantations, income was sometimes also earned working as mechanics at Nelson's Dockyard at Falmouth Harbour. Later on, their descendants also worked in other trades, such as tailors and shop keepers.

== Demographics ==
As of the 2011 census, Liberta has a population of 2,003. 93.22% of the village is of African descent. Other ethnic groups represented in the village are: other mixed (2.70%), Hispanics (1.48%), 'other' (0.79%), unknown (0.58%), whites (0.58%), East Indians (0.37%), and mixed black/white (0.26%). 73.25% of the population was born in Antigua and Barbuda. Dozens of nationalities were represented in the village, and other major countries of birth include: Jamaica (8.26%), Guyana (7.15%), and the United States (2.86%). Of the population born in Antigua and Barbuda, 12.07% had lived overseas at some point in their life. The village was mostly Christian, with major religious groups including Seventh-day Adventists (26.06%), Pentecostalists (12.50%), and Moravians (12.18%). A 2007 study found that major social issues in the village include the lack of a clinic, damage to public parks from natural disasters, and poor educational resources.

As of 2011, there were 740 households in the village. Based on the main material of outer walls, most homes were constructed with wood (42.70%), concrete blocks (30.95%), wood and concrete (17.84%), and concrete (6.08%). 90.68% of homes had sheet metal roofs.

== Features ==
Liberta is the fourth largest settlement in the country, and thus has a large amount of establishments and other places of interest. There are several restaurants, the St. Barnabas Anglican Church and the Galilean Baptist Church, and the St. Paul's Empowerment Centre. There are two grocery stores in village boundaries: Lyn's Superette and Laundry and Spencer's Supermarket. The village has a school: the Liberta Primary School. At 17°1′47.6″N 61°47′9.4″W there is a lookout over Falmouth Harbour. The village also has a small steelpan orchestra.

== See also ==
- Category:Antigua
