= All Saints, Antigua and Barbuda =

All Saints Aal Sient
- Village
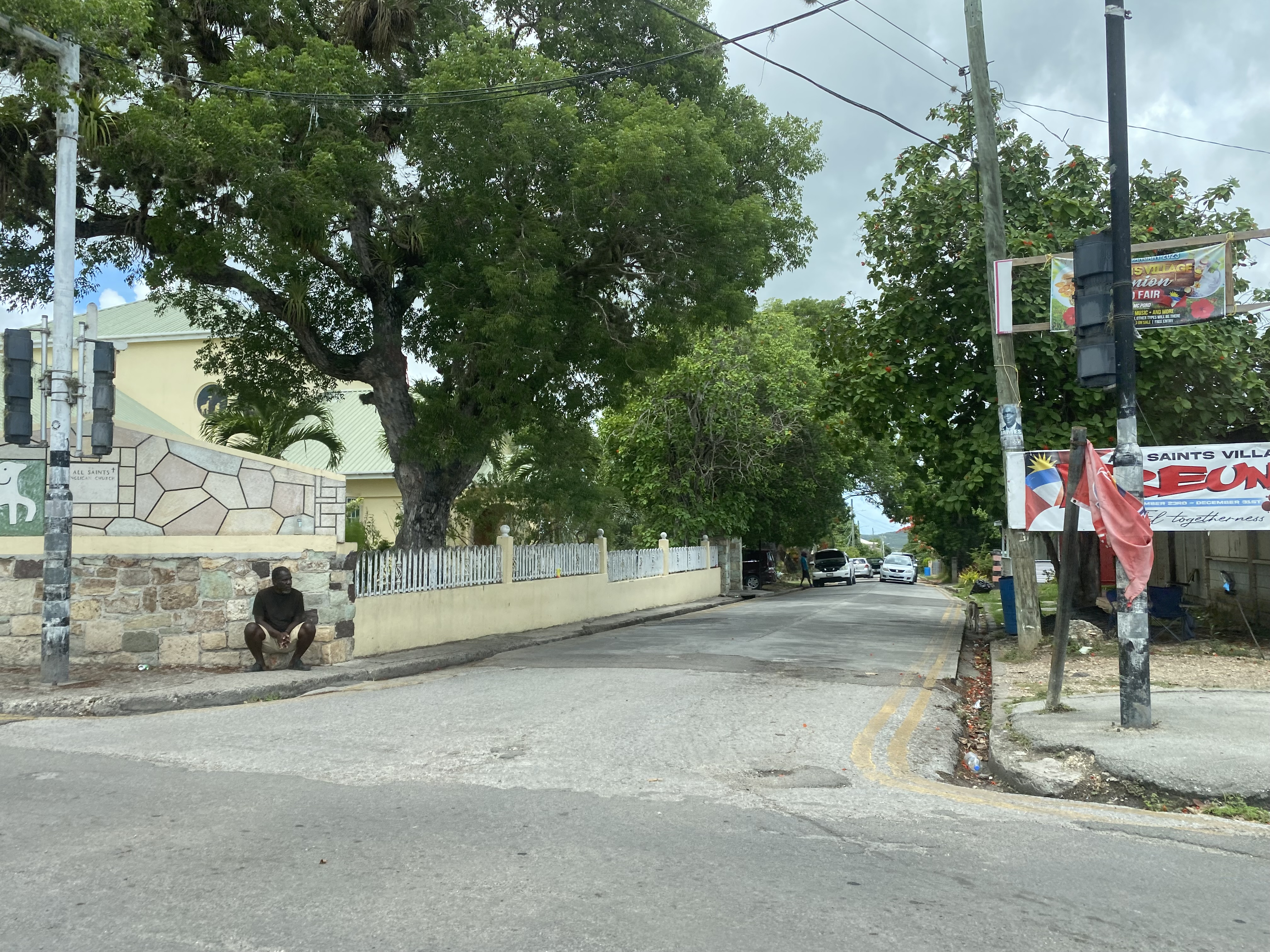
- All Saints in June 2023
- Interactive map of the All Saints main place
- Location within Antigua
- Coordinates: 17°03′55.63″N 61°47′24.43″W
- Country: Antigua and Barbuda
- Island: Antigua
- Civil parish: Saint Peter, Saint John, Saint Paul
- First settled: 1840
- Village Council established: May 15, 1946; 80 years ago

Government
  - Type: Village council
  - Body: All Saints Village Council (extinct)
  - MPs: Jamale Pringle; Anthony Smith

Area
  - Total: 4.7 km^{2} (1.8 sq mi)
- Elevation: 60 m (200 ft)

Population (2011)
  - Total: 3,812
  - Density: 810/km^{2} (2,100/sq mi)
- Time zone: UTC-4 (AST)

All Saints (Note: North Antiguan: Aal Sient [äːl seɪnt]) is the second largest settlement in Antigua and Barbuda, with a population of 3,812 as of 2011. It is located at the intersection of three parishes in Antigua's Central Plain, 8.6 kilometres southeast of the largest city, St. John's. The village is located on All Saints Road, linking it with the nearby villages of Clarkes Hill and Potters northbound, and Swetes, Liberta, and Falmouth southbound. Jonas Road also links it to Parham and Pares. It covers a land area of 4.7 square kilometres and the portion of the village in Saint Peter is the largest settlement in the parish. It also extends into Saint John and Saint Paul.

All Saints was one of the villages founded in the post-emancipation era by former black slaves. Its central location has allowed it to become one of the most populated on the island, as well as an anchor of the Central Plain urban area. Many residents of the village commute either into St. John's or into the English Harbour area. This residential village features several amenities including stores, restaurants, parks, churches, schools, and historical sites.

== Geography ==
According to the National Bureau of Statistics, All Saints has a total area of 4.7 square kilometres over thirteen enumeration districts. The village is located in a densely populated suburban corridor surrounded by farmland. The central and northwestern parts of the village are entirely settled, while the land surrounding it is agricultural land used for rough grazing, with some light crop farming. There are no significant ghauts or waterbodies in the village.

All Saints is entirely located in the Central Plain geologic formation. The more elevated western portion of the village is at high risk for landslides, while the eastern portion is at moderate risk. The village is at low risk for drought, despite its location in the Leeward Islands xeric scrub. The village's elevation of about 60 metres assists with drainage.

The village is about 1.3 kilometres southeast of Clarkes Hill, 2.6 kilometres southeast of Buckleys, 1.6 kilometres southwest of Freemans, 1.9 kilometres northeast of Swetes, and 3.4 kilometres north of Liberta. The village borders Clarkes Hill to the northwest, Buckleys to the west, Swetes to the southwest, Tyrells to the south, Table Hill Gardens to the southeast, Diamonds to the northeast, and Freemans and Sea View Farm to the north. The village is about four kilometres from the foothills of the Shekerley Mountains. There are two arterial roads in the village: All Saints Road, which connects it to both St. John's and English Harbour, and Jonas Road, which connects it to the rest of Saint Peter. The village is about 8.2 kilometres away from the nearest international air service at the V. C. Bird International Airport. The village is nearly surrounded by Antigua's historic rail infrastructure.

== History ==
Five years following emancipation, in 1839, a chapel was constructed on Osborne's pasture. Because it was constructed close to the boundary of multiple parishes bearing saints' names, this chapel was given the name "All Saints".

The village of All Saints was established around 1840. At first, All Saints was called Free-Centre Village and later Hyman's Village. All Saints was established shortly after the village chapel was constructed, as sugar workers started to leave the estates and move close to the chapel. The church was located at the village's central crossroad. The parish of Saint John lies to the north-west, Saint Peter to the north-east, and St. Paul to the south and south-east. The crossroads developed into the village's social, commercial, and cultural center. Several governmental and business institutions have been located here for decades.

There was a village council in All Saints beginning in the 1940s. The plan to establish a village council was approved by the Legislative Council on May 15, 1946, after it was published in the Gazette on April 11, 1946. This village council has been inactive since the 1950s. The official boundaries of All Saints were established by the village council rules, which also granted the village a constitution. There were eight members of the village council: six were chosen by the village's residents, and two were appointed by the governor general. A bylaw could be made by the village council with cabinet approval.

The village received piped water and electricity in the early 1960s. Regular live music events took place in the Community Council building. Due to the village's strategic location on the island, expanding services and activities, and increased population, All Saints saw a rise in both its significance and size.

== Demographics ==
As of the 2011 census, All Saints had a population of 3,812. There were several major ethnicities in the village, with 97.13% of the population being black. Other ethnicities included: other mixed (0.69%), unknown (0.60%), 'others' (0.48%), Hispanics (0.48%), mixed black/white (0.28%), whites (0.23%), and East Indians (0.12%). Dozens of nationalities were represented in the village. 74.59% of the village was born in Antigua and Barbuda, with other major countries of birth including: Guyana (10.07%), Jamaica (4.05%), and Dominica (2.92%). Of the population born in Antigua and Barbuda, 9.70% had lived abroad at some point in their life. Most of the population was Christian, with the largest denominations being Anglicans (22.58%), Seventh-day Adventists (13.31%), and Pentecostalists (11.35%). Irreligious people were the fourth largest group in the village at 8.88%.

In 2011, there were 1,235 households in the village. Based on the main material of outer walls, most homes were built with wood (49.47%), concrete (18.30%), a combination of wood and concrete (15.63%), and concrete blocks (14.25%). 95.38% of homes in the village had sheet metal roofs.

Educational officials have stated that the village struggles with high school dropout rates and teenage pregnancy. Immigrant communities in the village also tend to live in more dilapidated areas that struggle with crime. Some homes still use pit latrines.

== Features ==
All Saints is an important regional service centre. Thus, the village has many facilities including a fire station, police station, clinic, community centre, and many businesses. There is also a primary school (J.T. Ambrose Primary School), the All Saints Secondary School, and many nearby preschools.

There are several churches in the village, including the All Saints Anglican Church, the Faith Wesleyan Holiness Church, and the Mount Zion Seventh-day Church of God. Grocery stores in the village's boundaries include Cole's Grocery Plus and Sweet n' Cheap Super Mall.

There are also several sit-down and fast food restaurants in and around the village, including a pizza restaurant (Bitar Pizza Fast Food) and two ice cream parlors.
