= Swetes =

- Village
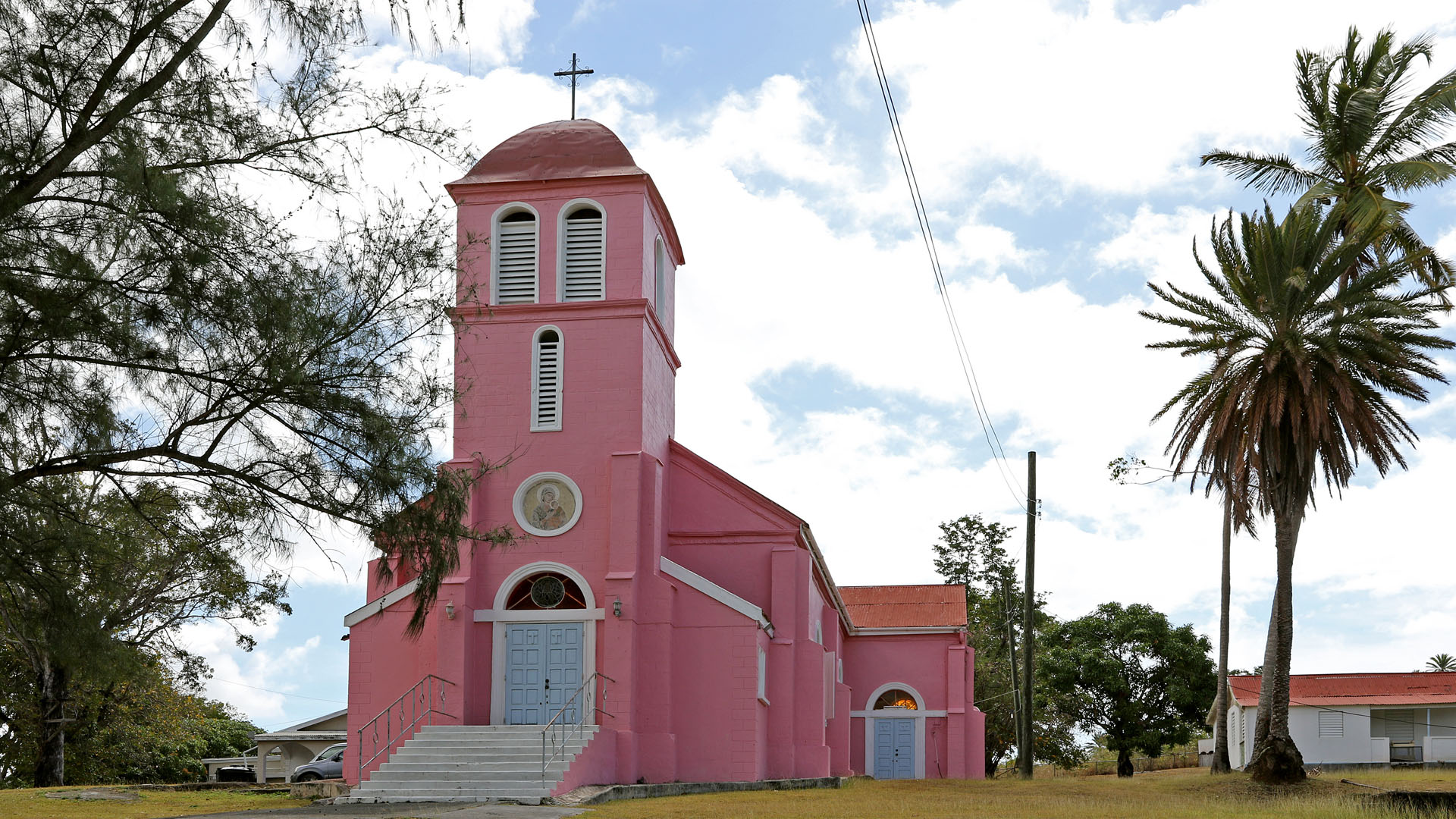
- Our Lady of Perpetual Help Church in 2015
- Interactive map of the Swetes main place
- Location within Antigua and Barbuda
- Coordinates: 17°3′8.03″N 61°47′58.02″W
- Country: Antigua and Barbuda
- Island: Antigua
- Parish: Saint Paul

Area
  - Total: 4.09 km^{2} (1.58 sq mi)
- Elevation: 60 m (200 ft)

Population (2011)
  - Total: 1,720
  - Density: 421/km^{2} (1,090/sq mi)
- Time zone: UTC-4 (AST)

Swetes (/swiːts/) (Note: South Antiguan: Sweet [swiːt]) is a village located in Saint Paul Parish on the island of Antigua, in Antigua and Barbuda. The village had a population of 1,720 in 2011 and covered a land area of 4.09 square kilometres. It is located at the junction of Fig Tree Drive, Matthews Road, and Jonas Road and is located at the foothills of the Shekerley Mountains.

With lowlands and valleys, the terrain of the Swetes region is nearly identical to that of Liberta, with the exception that there are less sharp hills. Since it is the area's flattest lowland, as opposed to Buckleys to the north and Follys and John Hughes to the west, many of slaves who were freed after slavery moved to Swetes. Swetes is part of the Round South cultural region that speaks South Antiguan Creole.

This community is named after Main Swete, who built a plantation there in the early 1700s. He died in 1735 after serving in the House of Assembly from 1715 to 1715. Henry Gale acquired ownership of the 180-acre estate soon after emancipation. Since the estate owners did not want to construct labourers' cottages after the great earthquake of 1843, Sweete's hamlet emerged when the owner sold some land to them in the mid-1840s. On 20 December 1946, a village council was established for Swetes, Buckleys, and John Hughes that lasted until the 1950s.

== Geography ==
According to the National Bureau of Statistics, Swetes has a total area of 4.09 square kilometres over five enumeration districts as of 2011. Swetes is located at the foothills of the Shekerley Mountains, and thus is one of the more elevated parts of the Central Plain region. The western portion of the village is covered by tropical rainforest separating it from John Hughes. The southern part of the village is also covered by forest. The geographical centre of the village also has some forest cover and agricultural (rough grazing) use. The eastern part of the village is covered by rural settlement and contains much of the village's population. Northern Swetes is also mostly used for agriculture. There are several water bodies in the village, including ghauts flowing from the mountains and Swetes Pond, one of the Body Ponds.

The village is at low risk for drought and high risk for landslides. The village is located on the boundary between Antigua's volcanic suite and Central Plain Group.

Swetes is located 1.8 kilometres southwest of All Saints, 2.2 kilometres northwest of Liberta, 3.9 kilometres southeast of John Hughes, and 3.9 km northwest of Falmouth. The village borders Buckleys and John Hughes to the west, All Saints to the north, Liberta to the south and east, and Dieppe Bay to the south. Important arterial roads in the village include Fig Tree Drive, which traverses the jungles of the Shekerley Mountains and links it to Follys, John Hughes, and Old Road; Matthews Road, which links it to the English Harbour area; and Jonas Road, which links it to All Saints and All Saints Road. The village is 9.9 kilometres away from the nearest international air service at V. C. Bird International Airport.

== History ==
Prior to the establishment of the village, several sugar plantations were located here. "Swete's" was a plantation that covered over three-hundred acres and was established c. 1701 by Main Swete of Modbury. There are no remnants left of this estate except for possibly the old estate house. Main Swete moved to London in 1688 and later to Antigua. On 15 July 1701, Swete's estate was surveyed and covered 337 acres. After his death he left the estate in trust to his young son. In 1736, a slave from the estate was caught tampering with military hardware on nearby Monks Hill as part of Prince Klaas's foiled rebellion and was punished. By 1840, the estate covered 180 acres.

Following emancipation in 1834, Henry Gale owned the estate. Like the owner of the nearby estate in Buckleys, he did not wish to fund the reconstruction of worker's quarters following the 1843 earthquake and thus sold a portion of the estate to its labourers, the genesis of Swetes village.

== Demographics ==
Swetes had a population of 1,720 in 2011. 95.43% of the population were African descendants. Other ethnic groups represented in the village were: other mixed (1.36%), unknown (0.80%), 'other' (0.74%), whites (0.68%), mixed black/white (0.37%), Hispanics (0.31%), and East Indians (0.31%). 74.95% of the population was born in Antigua and Barbuda. Other major countries of birth included: Guyana (8.02%), Jamaica (6.11%), and Dominica (3.08%). Of the population born in Antigua and Barbuda, 10.70% had lived abroad at some point in their life. The village was mostly Christian, with major religious groups including: Moravians (20.79%), the Wesleyan Holiness church (18.98%), and the Church of God (8.36%).

In 2011, there were 552 households in the village. Based on the material of outer walls, 41.49% of homes were constructed with wood. Other popular materials included a combination of wood and concrete (20.65%), concrete blocks (19.20%), and concrete (16.85%). 92.39% of homes had sheet metal roofs.

The village is the only one in the parish that speaks South Antiguan Creole, a moribund dialect of the larger Antiguan and Barbudan Creole language spoken on the southwest of Antigua in the Round South cultural region.

== Features ==
Swetes is one of the largest settlements in the country. It serves as an important transport link between the Central Plain urban area and the Old Road Division. There are several churches in the village including Our Lady of Perpetual Help, the local Catholic church, as well as the Cana Moravian Church. There are also two grocery stores: Val's Superette & Deli and the C. W. Enterprise. There is also the Irene B. Williams Secondary School. There are also several sit-down restaurants and fast-food places in the village's boundaries.

== Notable people ==
- George Alexander McGuire, patriarch of the African Orthodox Church
- Ridley Jacobs, cricketer
- Sir Curtly Ambrose, cricketer
