= History of Antigua and Barbuda (1871–1958) =

Presidency of the British Leeward Islands

Presidency of Antigua
- 1871-1958
- Flag (1956-1962) Coat of arms
- Recognised national languages: English
- Government: Presidency of the British Leeward Islands
- Currency: British West Indies dollar
- Today part of: Antigua and Barbuda

This article covers the history of the Presidency of Antigua from 1871 until 1958. During this period, Antigua was a presidency part of the British Leeward Islands, also including the islands of Barbuda and Redonda. During this era, universal suffrage was established, and local government thrived. In 1958, Antigua joined the West Indies Federation.

== Government ==
During the late 1800s and early 1900s, Antigua was a member of the British Leeward Islands, which also included the presidencies of St. Kitts-Nevis, Dominica, and Montserrat. Antigua was governed by a legislative council, with bills passed by the council being assented to by the Governor of the Leeward Islands.

On 14 August 1914, the Antigua Defence Force was put on active duty, composed of members of the Leeward Islands Police and the Defence Reserve Corps.

On 1 December 1951, Antigua adopted its first constitution, titled the "Constitution and Elections Ordinance". In the ordinance, Antigua was referred to as a "colony". The ordinance remained the constitution until 27 February 1967 when it was replaced by that of the Associated State of Antigua. The Legislative Council remained the presidency's legislature, now being composed of the attorney general, two nominated members, and ten elected members. At the time of adoption, the council had ten electoral districts.

== Elections ==
Three nationwide elections were held during the period of 1871 to 1958. The first was the 1946 general election, held under limited suffrage. After the adoption of the Constitution and Elections Ordinance, the first election under universal suffrage was held, the 1951 general election. The final election held under the period was the 1956 Antiguan general election. All three elections were landslide victories for the Antigua Trades and Labour Union and the Antigua Labour Party.

== Demographics ==
In 1911, the racial makeup of the population was as follows:

Race	Population
Black	27,224
Coloured	4,032
White	1,015
	32,271

== History by area ==
=== St. John's ===
In the late 1800s and early 1900s, the city of St. John's was governed by a city board.

=== Barbuda ===
Before the adoption of the Barbuda Ordinance, Barbuda did not have many governmental organs other than its magistrates' court. By 1898, the building was in need of repairs, and a proposal was made to construct an "overseer's house". On 30 April 1904, the Barbuda Ordinance went into force, establishing official boundaries for Codrington, making various regulations for the governance of the island, and establishing limited autonomy for the island. Per the ordinance, Barbuda was overseen by a warden.

=== Other villages ===
In 1945, a system of village councils was established for the island of Antigua. In 1950, the terms for the councils were extended. In December 1950, the registration process for the January 1951 village council elections began. On 4 December 1950, the village councils were as follows:

Village council	Chairperson
Swetes, Buckleys, and John Hughes	Ernest Williams (Swetes)
St. Johnston and Clare Hall	D. W. Hurst (Clare Hall)
Liberta	J. M. A. Edwards
Five Islands	W. J. Buntin
Bethesda and Christian Hill	Vida Martin (Bethesda)
Piggotts and Osbourn	S. T. James
Sea View Farm and Freemans	Christopher Reynolds (Sea View Farm)
Johnsons Point and Crabs Hill	John Sebastian
Potters Village	F. O. Benjamin
Bolans	Clifford Parker
Cedar Grove	M. C. Joseph
Parham and Pares	Rolston Williams
