= Transport in Antigua and Barbuda =

Antigua and Barbuda's transport systems include both public and privately run services. Roads in the country are paved and follow a winding and gently sloping course connecting parishes to villages and communities. Driving is on the left-hand side. The speed limit is set at 40 mph, Traffic signs posted throughout main roads in Antigua and Barbuda allow for ease of commute, and with GPS coordinates posted throughout the country, the process of navigation has become even easier.

Public transportation vehicles contain the letters "BUS" for buses or "TX" for taxis on their yellow licence plates. The government regulates taxi service, setting fixed fares rather than using a metered system. Taxi cabs are supposed to keep a copy of the rates inside the vehicle. On Antigua, taxis are easily found, particularly at the airport and at major hotels. Many taxi drivers also will act as tour guides.

Buses operate from 5:30 a.m. to 6:00 p.m. daily on Antigua, running between the capital city, St. John's, and various villages. However, buses do not stop at the airport or the northern tourist area. Although departure times are often left up to the driver, buses generally follow a set schedule. Most buses have their routes posted in the front windows, and they're usually privately owned mini-vans seating about 15 people. St. John's has two bus stations, the East Bus Station near the Botanical Gardens on Independence Ave and another one on Market St. near the Central Market. Several buses are also available on Barbuda.

== Legislation ==
=== Vehicles and Road Traffic (Enforcement and Administration) Act ===
When a police officer has cause to believe that an offense has been or is being committed, it is legal for him to issue a notice to the driver accusing him of committing the offense, informing him that a complaint will be made against him regarding it, and requiring him to either pay the fixed penalty within the time period specified in the notice or appear in court on the day and at the time specified in the notice to answer the charges.

== Road transport ==
Major roads

There are several highways in Antigua and Barbuda. All Saints Road traverses the Central Plain, and Valley Road follows the southwest coast.

=== West Bus Station Routes ===
1. 12 - Valley Rd, Joseph's Lane, All Saints Road, Belmont, Clarks Hill, Sea View Farm, Freemans Village.
2. 13 - Valley Rd, Joseph's Lane, All Saints Road, Belmont, Buckleys, Swetes Village, John Hughes.
3. 29 - Valley Rd, Joseph's Lane, All Saints Road, Belmont, Herberts.
4. 42 - Valley Rd, Vivian Richards Street, Independence Drive, Factory Road, East Bus Station, Hailes Promenade, Factory Road, Airport Road, Coolidge, Free Trade Zone.
5. 54 - Valley Rd, Vivian Richards Street, Independence Drive, Bishopgate Street, Cross Street, Friars Hill Road, Woods Mall.
6. 15 - Valley Rd, Joseph's Lane, All Saints Road, Belmont, Clarks Hill, All Saints Village, Liberta Village, terminating at Horsford Hill.
7. 17 - Valley Rd, Joseph's Lane, All Saints Road, Belmont, Clarks Hill, All Saints Village, Liberta Village, Falmouth, Cobbs Cross, English Harbour.
8. 22 - Valley Road, Golden Grove, Big Creek, Ebenezer, Jennings, Bolans, Crabb Hill, Johnson Point, Urlings, Old Road.
9. 50 - Valley Rd, Vivian Richards Street, Independence Drive, Bishopgate Street, Cross Street, Dickenson Bay Street, Villa, Yorks.
10. 20 - Valley Road, Golden Grove, Big Creek, Ebenezer, Jennings, Bolans.
11. 10 - Valley Rd, Joseph's Lane, All Saints Road, Bendals.
12. 61 1 Valley Road, Federation Road, Gray's Farm. Greenbay, Five Islands.

== Water transport ==
Ports of entry in Antigua

Several ports and harbours provide docking for cruise ships, sailboats, yachts, and other boats. All boats are required to enter in Antigua before continuing to Barbuda, and they must obtain a permit from the Port Authority to do so. Fees apply both for entering and docking in the country. The main port is at St. John's, receiving cruise ships and the Barbuda Express. The Barbuda Express travels between St. John's and Barbuda five days a week. Cruise ships also dock at Heritage Quay. English Harbour, the site of Nelson's Dockyard, began as an important port on Antigua centuries ago. Other ports and harbours include Jolly Harbour, Deepwater Harbour, High Point Crabbs Peninsula, and Codrington (Barbuda).

== Air transport ==
Current and former airports and seaplane bases in Antigua and Barbuda

The country's major airport is V. C. Bird International Airport, which serves both international and local carriers. Located near St. John's on Antigua's northern coast, all commercial flights to the country first enter at this airport. After arriving at the airport, travellers can take chartered flights or boats to Barbuda or other Caribbean destinations. The main airport in Barbuda is Burton–Nibbs International Airport, there is also the closed Barbuda Codrington Airport. Coco Point Lodge Airstrip was demolished following Hurricane Irma. There are two heliports– one on Fort Road and one in the Orange Valley south of Jolly Harbour. There is also a heliport at the Mount St. John's Medical Centre.

== Rail transport ==
The rail network in 1957

The Antiguan rail system was established around 1903 to connect sugarcane plantations. These were shut down in 1971 as the island transferred its economy away from the product. These lines were 762 mm narrowgauge lines. The lines connected all six parishes and were centred around the main sugar depot in Gunthropes. Following its closure, Antigua attempted to establish a tourist line although this quickly failed. Some of the track still remains. 26 locomotives operated in the system. Major settlements on the line included St. John's, All Saints, Bolans, Parham, and Piggotts.

== Statistics ==
=== Railways ===
There were formerly around 80 km of narrowgauge railways.

=== Ports and harbours ===
St. John's Harbour

=== Airports ===
3 (2008)

Airports - with paved runways:
total:2
2,438 to 3,047 m: 1
under 914 m: 1 (2008)

Airports - with unpaved runways:
total: 1
under 914 m: 1 (2008)

== See also ==
- Antigua and Barbuda
- History of Antigua and Barbuda
- Economy of Antigua and Barbuda
- Arawak Motors
