= List of bridges in Antigua and Barbuda =

This is a list of bridges and viaducts in Antigua and Barbuda, including those for pedestrians and vehicular traffic.

== List ==
Name	Carries	Location	Parish(es)
Big Creek Bridge	Valley Road	Creekside (17°05′31.87″N 61°50′56.20″W)	Saint John, Saint Mary
Bendals Bridge	Bendals Main Road	Bendals (17°04′53.91″N 61°50′01.07″W)	Saint John
Folly Gut Bridge	Fig Tree Drive	John Hughes (17°02′54.00″N 61°48′42.77″W)	Saint Mary
Gilberts Bridge	Sir Robin Yearwood Highway	Gilberts (17°05′08.60″N 61°44′18.00″W)	Saint Peter
North Sound Bridge	Sir Sydney Walling Highway	North Sound (17°06′17.98″N 61°47′25.82″W)	Saint George
