= Sea View Farm =

- Village
- Interactive map of the Sea View Farm main place
- Location within Antigua and Barbuda
- Coordinates: 17°05′24″N 61°48′10″W
- Country: Antigua and Barbuda
- Island: Antigua
- Civil parish: Saint George Parish

Area
  - Total: 1.07 km^{2} (0.41 sq mi)

Population (2011)
  - Total: 792
  - Density: 740/km^{2} (1,920/sq mi)
- Time zone: UTC-4 (AST)

Sea View Farm is a village located in Saint George on the island of Antigua, in Antigua and Barbuda. Sea View Farm had a population of 792 in 2011 over 1.07 square kilometres. One of the first villages established by emancipated slaves on the island, the village became the centre of traditional pottery on Antigua. Sea View Farm also has an important history with education, once being home to the largest educational institution in the Leeward Islands. Today, Sea View Farm is one of the largest villages in the parish and in the Central Plain region.

== Geography ==
According to the National Bureau of Statistics, Sea View Farm has a total area of 1.07 square kilometres in three enumeration districts. The village is located in the densely populated Central Plain, with the eastern portion of the village mostly being covered by rural settlement. The western portion is mostly agricultural land used for rough grazing. There are also the East Dam (17°5′20.74″N 61°47′36.63″W) and mixed grazing lands in this part of the village as well.

Sea View Farm is located Antigua's Central Plain geological province. Most of the village is at high or moderate risk for landslides, with some pockets of low risk areas. The village is at low risk for drought. As the name suggests, the village has a view of the Caribbean Sea between Antigua and Barbuda and has a slightly higher elevation than other villages in the area at 74 metres above sea level.

Sea View Farm is about 1.7 kilometres from Potters, 2.3 kilometres from Buckleys, 3.2 kilometres from Vernons, and 3.3 kilometres from Paynters. The village is bounded on the west by Renfrew, on the north by Upper Lightfoot, on the east by Vernons and Freemans, and on the south by All Saints and Clarkes Hill. Sea View Farm Road marks the western boundary of the village which connects it to the Sir Sidney Walling Highway in Paynters and All Saints Road at the very southern point of the village. The village is about 6 kilometres from the nearest international air service at V. C. Bird International Airport.

== History ==
Prior to the establishment of the village, what is now Sea View Farm contained a home known as "Government House", called this as former governor Ashton Warner built a home there, and this home eventually leased by the island's assembly to other succeeding governors as well. At the time of Prince Klaas's planned rebellion in the late 1720s and early 1730s, governor Sir William Matthew lived here. There were plans to blow up the house to establish an African-ruled kingdom on the island, although the plot was foiled prior to any action.

The area was largely devoid of human activity beyond a small sugar estate labeled on an 1829 map as "Farm". This is likely due to the hillier terrain of the village compared to the surrounding plain. The Farm was established by Maria Augusta Laviscount in the 1820s. It coincided with the former "Government House" section of Clarkes Hill estate. The village itself is traditionally considered to have been established on 1 August 1834, the day that a recently emancipated slave named Bathsheba as well as the day emancipation took effect in the British Empire. This supports the claim that Sea View Farm was the first village established by ex-slaves on the island.

The first substantial activity in the area came in the 1840s when Moravian bishop George Westerby established a teacher training college known as Lebanon which by the 1880s was the largest educational institution in the British Leeward Islands. The population likely grew due to the abundance of resources aiding the pottery sector. By 1856, Sea View Farm had a population of 1,119 (583 men and 536 women) in 284 homes.

Sea View Farm is most known for its pottery– once deemed the "King Village" because of its dominance in this sector. Up to the 1940s, most Antiguans used small pots for cooking, and the soil of the Sea View Farm area, specifically an area known as Jumbolum, was prized due to its orange-brown colour. All stages of the pottery-making process take place in Sea View Farm. The process and intricacies of pottery-making here have African influence. The industry is in decline however, with the number of families involved in the craft decreasing from about twenty in 1962 to just six in 2002. Another important part of the village's culture is the "Pain Killer Tree" in North Sound, where persons would insert nails for its supposed healing properties.

In 1970, Sea View Farm had a population of 971 people in 257 households. The current primary school in the village was built between 1987 and 1988. In 1991, Sea View Farm had a population of 673, and in 2001 it had a population of 837.

== Demographics ==
In 2011, the village had a population of 792 people in three enumeration districts. Various ethnic groups were present in the village, including African descendants (89.84%), other mixed (6.55%), Hispanic (1.07%), mixed black/white (0.80%), white (0.67%), East Indian (0.53%), unknown (0.40%), and other (0.13%). Major religious denominations in the village included Moravians (22.19%), Adventists (14.30%), and Catholics (12.30%). Most of the population (66.98%) was born in Antigua and Barbuda, with other major countries of birth including Jamaica (7.22%), Guyana (6.82%), Dominica (6.28%), and the United States (3.34%).

In 2011, there were 294 households in the village. Homes in the village used a variety of outer wall materials including wood (40.48%), concrete (38.10%), a combination of wood and concrete (12.59%), and concrete blocks (6.46%). Most homes (88.44%) had sheet metal roofs. Of the population born in Antigua and Barbuda, 13.37% had lived abroad at some point in their life. The village is considered to be one of the lower income communities on the island as of 2007, although the major division had a relatively high living conditions index, similar to that of Clare Hall and slightly higher than English Harbour. A 2008 survey found the village to be upper low income.

== Features ==
The main road in the village is the Sea View Farm Main Road, which links the village with the larger All Saints Road that traverses much of the Central Plain. Many notable sites are located in and around the village, including the Gideon Seventh-day Adventist Church, the Sea View Farm Kingdom Hall, and the Good Shepard Catholic Church. There are many restaurants and bakeries in the village. Younger students attend the Sea View Farm Primary School which is located on the main road.
