= Burning Flames Highway =

Highway in Antigua

Coordinates: 17°06′36.3″N 61°49′00.8″W

Road 29
- Burning Flames Highway

Route information
- Length: 3.4 km (2.1 mi)

Major junctions
- From: Factory Road in Scotts Hill
- To: Road 1 (All Saints Road) in Potters Village

Location
- Country: Antigua and Barbuda

Highway system
- Roads in Antigua and Barbuda

The Burning Flames Highway is a north–south highway in Antigua. The highway, formerly composed of Herberts Road and Potters Village Main Road, was officially renamed after the band Burning Flames in August 2025. The highway is located in the Central Plain and is the main arterial road in the Potters area. The highway passes through agricultural grazing land as well as rural and urban settlement. The highway passes through Scotts Hill and Potters. Major junctions on the highway in Scotts Hill are at 0.15 km, 0.6 km, 0.75 km and 0.85 km. Major junctions in Potters are at 1.6 km, 2.1 km, and Bachelor Street (2.5 km). The road terminates at All Saints Road in Potters (3.4 km). The central government announced in November 2025 that they are working with a Colombian company to test experimental silicon pox material on the highway. Following the renaming of the road there were proposals that Potters Village should be renamed after the band as well.

== Junctions ==
The entire route is in Saint John Parish.

Location	km	mi	Destinations	Notes
Scotts Hill	0.0	0.0	Factory Road	
Scotts Hill	0.15	0.093	Unnamed road #1	
Scotts Hill	0.6	0.37	Unnamed road #2	
Scotts Hill	0.75	0.47	Unnamed road #3	
Scotts Hill	0.85	0.53	Unnamed road #4	
Potters Village	1.6	0.99	Unnamed road #5	
Potters Village	2.1	1.3	Unnamed road #6	
Potters Village	2.5	1.6	Bachelor Street	
Potters Village	3.4	2.1	All Saints Road	
1.000 mi = 1.609 km; 1.000 km = 0.621 mi
