= Fitches Creek (stream) =

Coordinates: 17°07′17″N 61°47′06″W

Location
- Country: Antigua and Barbuda

Physical characteristics
- Mouth
  - location: Fitches Creek Bay

Fitches Creek is a stream of Antigua and Barbuda. It is located on the island of Antigua near the community of Fitches Creek. Although only a few kilometers long, it is one of the main watercourses of the island.

== Course ==
Fitches Creek drains from the area east of St. John's to North Sound, the Atlantic northeast coast of Antigua.

It is formed from several ruts that come from the Potters Village and Piggotts, and from Sea View Farm in the Central Plain north of All Saints, and unites at Upper Lightfoot and Sugar Factory/Gunthorpes, just west of the Sir Vivian Richards Stadium. Almost 2 kilometers further north, southeast of the village of Fitches Creek and west of the peninsula of Blackman's, the stream flows into the southern Fitches Creek Bay, an inner side bay of the North Sound.

== Hydrography and conservation ==
The Fitches Creek catchment area is 10.4 square kilometres (No. 3/5), the fifth largest on the island. There are several medium-sized storage ponds here that ensure agricultural irrigation: Antigua is one of the most drought-stricken islands in the Caribbean, with severe droughts occurring on a regular basis. After the Bethesda catchment area (No. 47, at Willoughby Bay) with the Bethesda Dam, Fitches Creek is the second best developed catchment area in terms of agriculture. The total storage volume in the room is over 410,000 cubic metres (compared to 537,000 cubic metres for the Bethesda reservoir), that is 1/4 of the stored irrigation supply of the island (1.5 million cubic metres).

The mouth estuary of Fitches Creek is still a largely natural wetland and known for its wealth of birds. It belongs to the Important Bird Area Fitches Creek Bay (AG007) described by BirdLife International. The Fitches Creek Protected Area, together with the northern estuary of the Winthorpes Foot Creek, has been proposed, although protected status for this area is still in legal development.

== See also ==
- List of rivers of Antigua and Barbuda
