= Follys Ghaut =

Stream in Antigua

Coordinates: 17°02′54.00″N 61°48′42.77″W

Location
- Country: Antigua and Barbuda

Follys Ghaut is a ghaut near John Hughes, Antigua and Barbuda. Its source is located in the Shekerley Mountains and it empties into Swetes Dam. Fig Tree Drive passes over the ghaut, carried by the Follys Ghaut Bridge.

== See also ==
- List of rivers of Antigua and Barbuda
