= Road 39 (Antigua) =

Numbered route in Antigua

Coordinates: 17°1′29.45″N 61°46′40.90″W

Road 39

Route information
- Length: 7.0 km (4.3 mi)

Major junctions
- From: All Saints Road in All Saints
- To: Dockyard Drive in English Harbour

Location
- Country: Antigua and Barbuda

Highway system
- Roads in Antigua and Barbuda

Road 39 is the legal designation for several routes connecting All Saints and English Harbour. Named segments of the road include Matthews Road and Tyrells Main Road. Road 39 begins at the junction of Jonas Road and All Saints Road in All Saints and continues south to the junction with Fig Tree Drive at 1.5 km. At 2.5 km there is a junction with Mount William Drive. The road then continues in a southwest direction to a junction with an unnamed road at 2.9 km, terminating in northern English Harbour at Dockyard Drive (7.0 km). The road passes through several major villages including Swetes, Liberta, and the town of Falmouth. The road is used as the basis of some constituency boundaries.

== Junctions ==
Parish	Location	km	mi	Destinations	Notes
Saint Paul	All Saints	0.0	0.0	All Saints Road	
Saint Paul	Swetes	1.5	0.93	Fig Tree Drive	
Saint Paul	Liberta	2.5	1.6	Mount William Drive	
Saint Paul	Liberta	2.9	1.8	Unnamed road	
Saint Paul	English Harbour	7.0	4.3	Dockyard Drive	
1.000 mi = 1.609 km; 1.000 km = 0.621 mi
