= 2025 census =

2025 census may refer to:

- 2025 Alberta municipal censuses
- 2025 Antiguan and Barbudan census
