= Census in Antigua and Barbuda =

Population and Housing Census
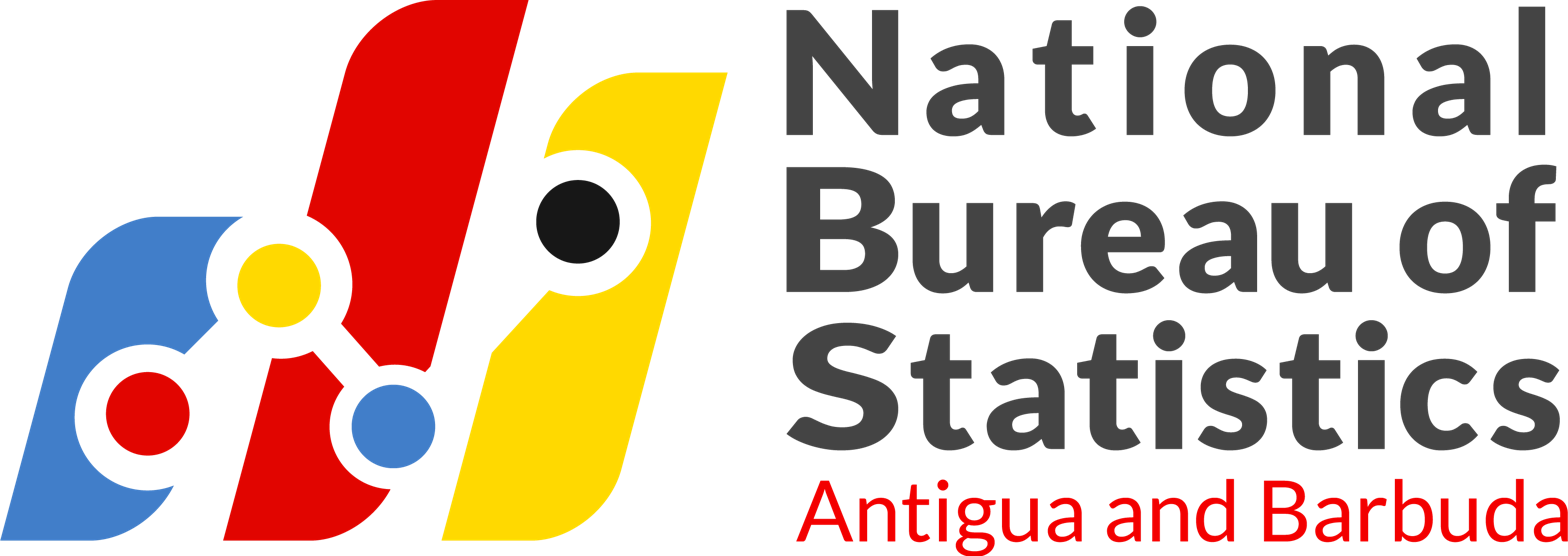
- The National Bureau of Statistics is legally an independent agency of the Government of Antigua and Barbuda.
- Frequency: Decennial
- Country: Antigua and Barbuda
- Inaugurated: May 28, 1991; 35 years ago
- Most recent: June 25, 2025; 16 months ago
- Website: https://statistics.gov.ag/census/

Antigua and Barbuda conducts censuses every ten years. The first census following independence was taken in 1991 under the Vere Bird administration, and there have been two other censuses since then. The National Bureau of Statistics is responsible for conducting the census. The most recent national census was conducted in 2025.

== Legal basis ==
The census is mandated by the National Bureau of Statistics Act, 2013 signed by Louise Lake-Tack which instructs that director-general of the bureau collect information on population, migration and citizenship, human settlements, income, and education among other subjects. Census takers are required to swear an oath protecting the census' confidentiality, and the revealing of private census information is illegal.

== Procedure ==
Decennial census figures are based on persons living in Antiguan and Barbudan households, although institutionalized persons and cruise-ship employees have also been instructed to take the census. All persons residing in the country, regardless of immigration status, are tabulated in the census. When a household refuses to take the census, the number of persons residing in the household is defined as that of the parish average. In some censuses, census-takers have also been instructed to guess the amount of persons in the household based on what the census-taker observes. It is legal to refuse to take the census, and residents outside of the country during the census period are not tabulated. Persons in restricted institutions and vagrants (homeless people) are usually not included in informational data tables.

Censuses are usually assigned the reference date of 28 May in a year ending in one. This will be the case for the 2031 census, and has also been the case for all censuses other than the 2025 census, when the date was moved to 25 June following four years of delays. As population and housing characteristics change during the year, questions are asked as of the reference date, rather than the time the census form as actually completed.

== History ==
While censuses have been taken prior to independence, the last time being in 1970, the first modern census was conducted in 1991 under the Statistics Division.

Year	Total population	Change in population	Ethnic demographics counted
1991	62,929	▼2.88%	African/Negro/Black, Amerindian/Carib, East Indian, Chinese, Portuguese, Syrian/Lebanese, White, Mixed, other
2001	72,829	▲15.73%	African/Negro/Black, Amerindian/Carib, East Indian, Chinese, Portuguese, Syrian/Lebanese, Caucasian/White, Mixed, other
2011	83,278	▲14.35%	African/Black/Negro, Amerindian/Carib, Asian, Caucasian/White, Chinese, East Indian/Indian, Mixed (Black/White), Mixed (Other), Portuguese, Hispanic, Syrian/Lebanese, other ethnic group
