= St. John's Division =

Division of Antigua

St. John's
- Division
- Coordinates: 17°04′10″N 61°48′47″W
- Country: Antigua and Barbuda
- Parish: Saint John

St. John's is a division of Saint John, Antigua and Barbuda. Named after the city of St. John's, it also contains areas outside of the city including parts of All Saints and other villages along the All Saints Road corridor. Due to the administrative status of St. John's, especially at the time when divisions had their own justices of the peace, division officials often had limited jurisdiction in city limits.
