= All Saints Road =

All Saints Road may refer to:

- All Saints Road (Antigua)
- All Saints Road (London)
