= Barbuda (Extension of Laws of Antigua) Act =

1859 act of the Legislative Council of Antigua

- Long title: An Act to extend the Operation of the Laws of Antigua to the Island of Barbuda
- Assented to by: Queen Victoria
- Assented to: 8 August 1859
- Commenced: 23 September 1859
- Status: In force

The Barbuda (Extension of Laws of Antigua) Act (c. 43) is an act of the Legislative Council of Antigua which provided a framework for the Antiguan annexation of Barbuda. Due to the nature of the act, it was submitted to Queen Victoria for royal assent. The Privy Council declared Barbuda part of Antigua on 1 August 1860.

== Contents and history ==
The act establishes that the monarch may order that Barbuda become a dependency of Antigua at any time. Upon annexation, the island became subject to all laws and statutes of Antigua. The law could not go into force until it received assent from the Queen, due to the act involving the annexation of an inhabited territory under a different administration. On 8 August 1859, an act of Parliament in the United Kingdom, the Antigua and Barbuda Act 1859 (22 & 23 Vict. c. 13) confirmed the Antiguan law, and on 1 August 1860 Barbuda was officially declared annexed to Antigua.

== See also ==
- Law of Barbuda
- Redonda Annexation Act
- History of Antigua and Barbuda (1833–1870)
