= Redonda Annexation Act =

- Commenced: 26 March 1872
- Status: In force

The Redonda Annexation Act (c. 373) is an act of the Legislative Council of Antigua which annexed the uninhabited island of Redonda into the parish of Saint John in the Presidency of Antigua, Leeward Islands. This is the last time the borders of what would become Antigua and Barbuda were changed. It went into force on 26 March 1872.

== Contents and history ==
The act declared that upon annexation, Redonda would be subject to all laws and statues of the Presidency of Antigua. The act also permitted the Legislative Council to declare that certain laws may not be applied to the island. The act stated that the island was to become part of the parish of Saint John, and that it would be subject to magistrates' court district "A".

Due to international recognition of Redonda as Antiguan territory, Antigua and Barbuda's exclusive economic zone stretches in between Nevis and Montserrat.

== See also ==
- Barbuda (Extension of Laws of Antigua) Act
- History of Antigua and Barbuda (1871–1958)
