= Ayers Creek =

Coordinates: 17°04′22″N 61°42′22″W

Location
- Country: Antigua and Barbuda

Ayers Creek is a stream of Antigua and Barbuda. It is located on the island of Antigua.

== See also ==
- List of rivers of Antigua and Barbuda
