= Big Creek Bridge (Antigua) =

Bridge in Antigua

- The bridge in 2026
- Coordinates: 17°05′31.87″N 61°50′56.20″W
- Carries: Road 2 (Valley Road)
- Crosses: Cooks Creek
- Locale: Creekside, Antigua and Barbuda

Location
- Interactive map of Big Creek Bridge

Big Creek Bridge is a bridge located in western Antigua spanning Cooks Creek, the boundary between the parishes of Saint John and Saint Mary. It replaced the adjacent Old Big Creek Bridge which was abandoned following an earthquake in 1974. It carries Valley Road, the main link to the southwestern coast of the island.

The current bridge was built with aid from the Chinese government. The government took out a loan in 1988 and has made multiple requests to relieve the debt. Due to the road's curvature in this area, the bridge is prone to accidents. In 2005 residents of the closest village, Creekside, planted a row of palm trees and other plants to protect the settlement from motor accidents.
