= Burning Flames =

Antiguan Soca music band

Original Burning Flames
- Origin: St. John, Antigua
- Genres: Soca music
- Years active: 1984–present
- Label: Mango
- Members: Toriano "Onyan" Edwards; David "Krokus" Edwards; Clarence "Oungku" Edwards; Rone "Foxx" Watkins
- Past members: Clarence "Oungku" Edwards; Rone "Foxx" Watkins; Bryan Fontanelle; Onika Bostik; Dalma "Shaka" Samuel Jr.

Burning Flames are an Antiguan Soca music band from St. John. Their music is influenced by calypso, reggae, ragga, funk, and zouk.

== Biography ==
The band formed in St. John in 1984. The original lineup included three brothers — Toriano "King Onyan" Edwards (vocals, guitar), the multi-monikered David "Bubb-I/Krokuss/Lord Satellite/Natural Rampler" Edwards (vocals, bass), and Clarence "Oungku" Edwards (vocals, keyboards) (just like with George Jones of Barbados' soca band Square One (band)} — along with their nephew, drummer Rone "Foxx" Watkins. The three brothers had previously worked together as buskers, and Clarence and Toriano played in Arrow's backing band. The band won their first Antigua Carnival Road March title in 1985 with their song "Stiley Tight", which was issued as their debut single in 1986. They went on to have international success in 1989 with "Workey Workey", which was also later covered by Byron Lee & the Dragonaires. Burning Flames was hugely influential in bringing about the modernization of soca in the Eastern Caribbean, and in turn being a huge influence on the evolution of soca in its country of birth, Trinidad and Tobago. The advent and utilization of the drum machine, digital sampler, electronic drums and other emerging music technologies and techniques in soca was almost single-handedly popularized by the quartet. Indeed, their outsize influence on soca songwriting, live performance, music production and arrangement, and their seminal and innovative use of drum machines and synthesizers cannot be overstated. The Burning Flames sonic DNA can be heard in the soca of bands and artists throughout the Eastern Caribbean, Barbados, and even Trinidad and Tobago (1985 to 2000s).

The band signed for Mango Records in 1991, releasing the album Dig.

They won the Road March title on five occasions between 1991 and 1996, and in 1997 Toriano Edwards embarked on a solo career as King Onyan, going on to win four Calypso Monarch titles, eventually leaving the band.

The other members recruited St. Lucian guitarist Bryan Fontanelle and Trinidadian soca chanteuse Onika Bostik, and the new lineup recorded the album HokusPokus (1999). They won the Road March title again in 1999 with "Magician (I Command You)".

Bostik died on 19 December 2004, due to injuries sustained in a car crash on 11 December. The following year, lead singer Oungku left Burning Flames after winning that year's Carnival Road March with the single "De Harder Deh Come", and formed a new band, Red Hot Flames. From his song, "Oungku Too Bad-Minded", it became apparent that Oungku left the band due to some kind of controversy. He said it was because the band had outgrown its members. Red Hot Flames went on to win the 2006 road march competition with the single "Trouble". That year, original band member Onyan rejoined with bass player and vocalist David "Krokuss" Edwards, also known as Lord Satellite. The first album of the reformed band was entitled Ebry Bady Ha Fu Nyam and featured hit songs like "Raw Sole" and "Green Bush". They went on to reclaim the Road March title with the single "Papi" from their 2007 album De Real Fyah.

In August 2025, Potters Village Main Road was renamed the Burning Flames Highway.

== Discography ==
=== Singles ===
- "Stylee Tight" (1985)
- "Bicycle" (1988)
- "Island Girl" (1989)
- "Workey, Workey" (1989)
- "Crazy"(1990)
- "Oh Yah Yai" (1991)
- "Knuckle" (1993)
- "Juantana Mera" (cover of "Guantanamera")(1994)
- "Gym Jam" (1995)
- "Swinging Engine" (1996)
- "Mash it up" (2001)
- "Rush" (2003)
- "Road Rage" (2004)
- "De Harder Dey Come" (2005)
- "I Man Haffu Nyam" (2006)
- "Pig Tail and Pig Mouth" (2006)
- "Papi" (2007)
- "Jam Um In De Iron Band" (2008)
- "Kayo" (2008)
- "Wash Yu Kin" (2008)
- "Out Ah Order" (2009)

=== Albums ===
- Stylee Tight (1985)
- Burning Flames Rule (1986)
- De Session Pwyle (1987), Burning Flames Music
- Rysh & Dutty-Wave And Jump (1988), Burning Flames Music
- Light Years Ahead (1988)
- Me Na Freard (1989), Burning Flames Music
- Mek E Bark (1990), Dr. G
- Say It's War (1991)
- Dig (1992), Mango
- Hard Fu Dead (1992)
- Briggiding Biff (1993)
- Klatye (1994)
- As You Were (1995), Tropical Vibes
- Workey Workey (1996), Charly
- Batten Dong Woosh (1996)
- Fan De Flames-2 Hot 2 Handle (1997), Burning Flames Music
- Oh Behave-Nothing Personal, Just Business (1998), Tropical Vibes
- Hokuspokus (1999), Arrow Music
- Jam-eulus (2000), Tropical Vibes
- Burning Flames Are Unstoppable (2001)
- Phenomenal Supa Soca (2002)
- Venom (2003)
- Debblish Rage (2004)
- ONIKA-Always & Forever (2005)
- Frolic (2005)
- Ebry Bady Ha Fu Nyam (2006)
- De Real Fyah (2007)
- Still Burning, Hard Fu Out (2008)
- U Pan U Own (2009)
- Reeaally !!?? (25th Anniversary) (2010)
- "Ah Patta Dem Come Fram" (2011)
- "Countdown To Rehab" (2012)
- "Kanaval Nah Ga Narmal" (2013)
- "Let Um Go - Ah Nah How You Look" (2014)

== Members ==
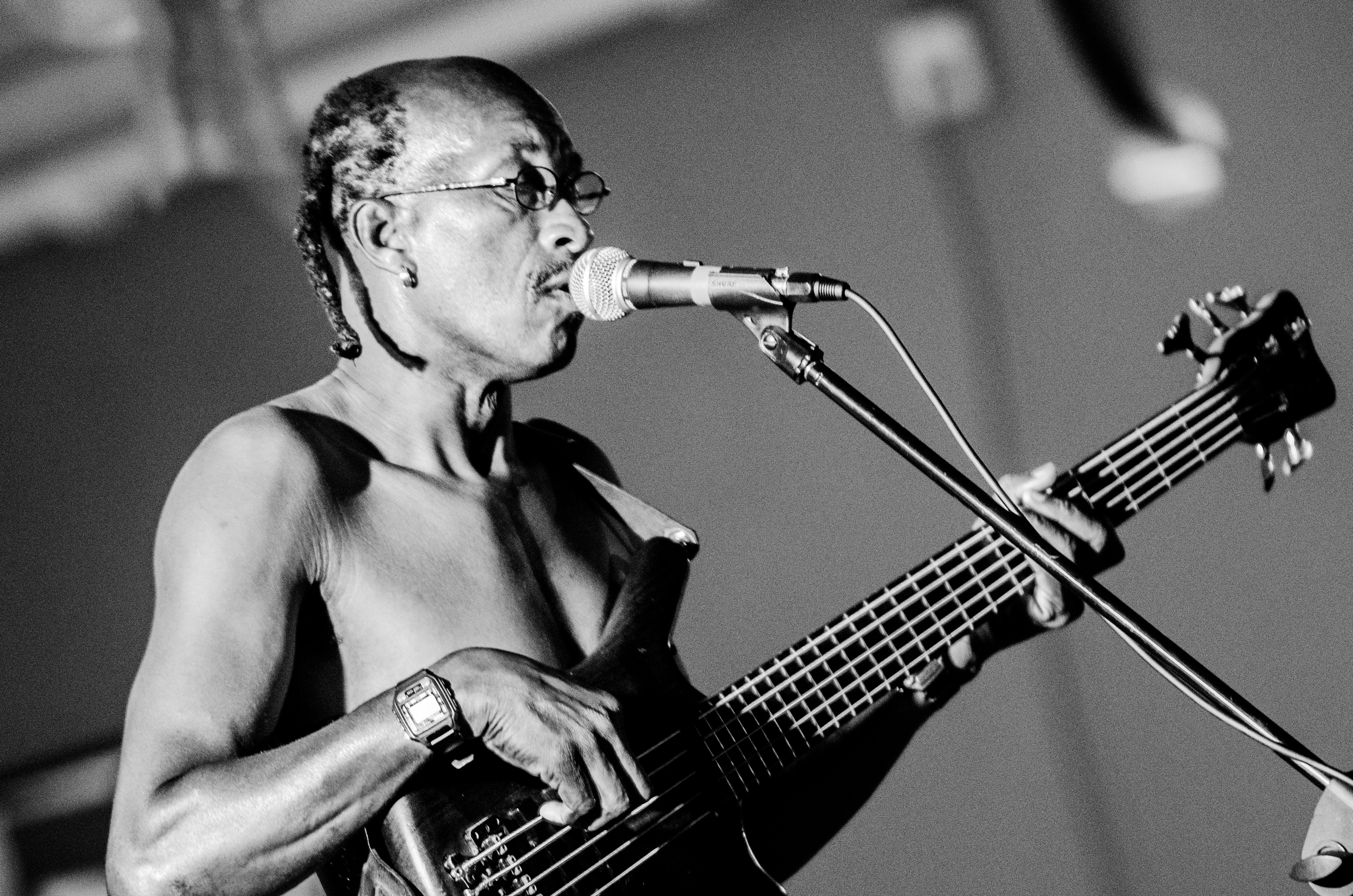
David "Krokuss" Edwards

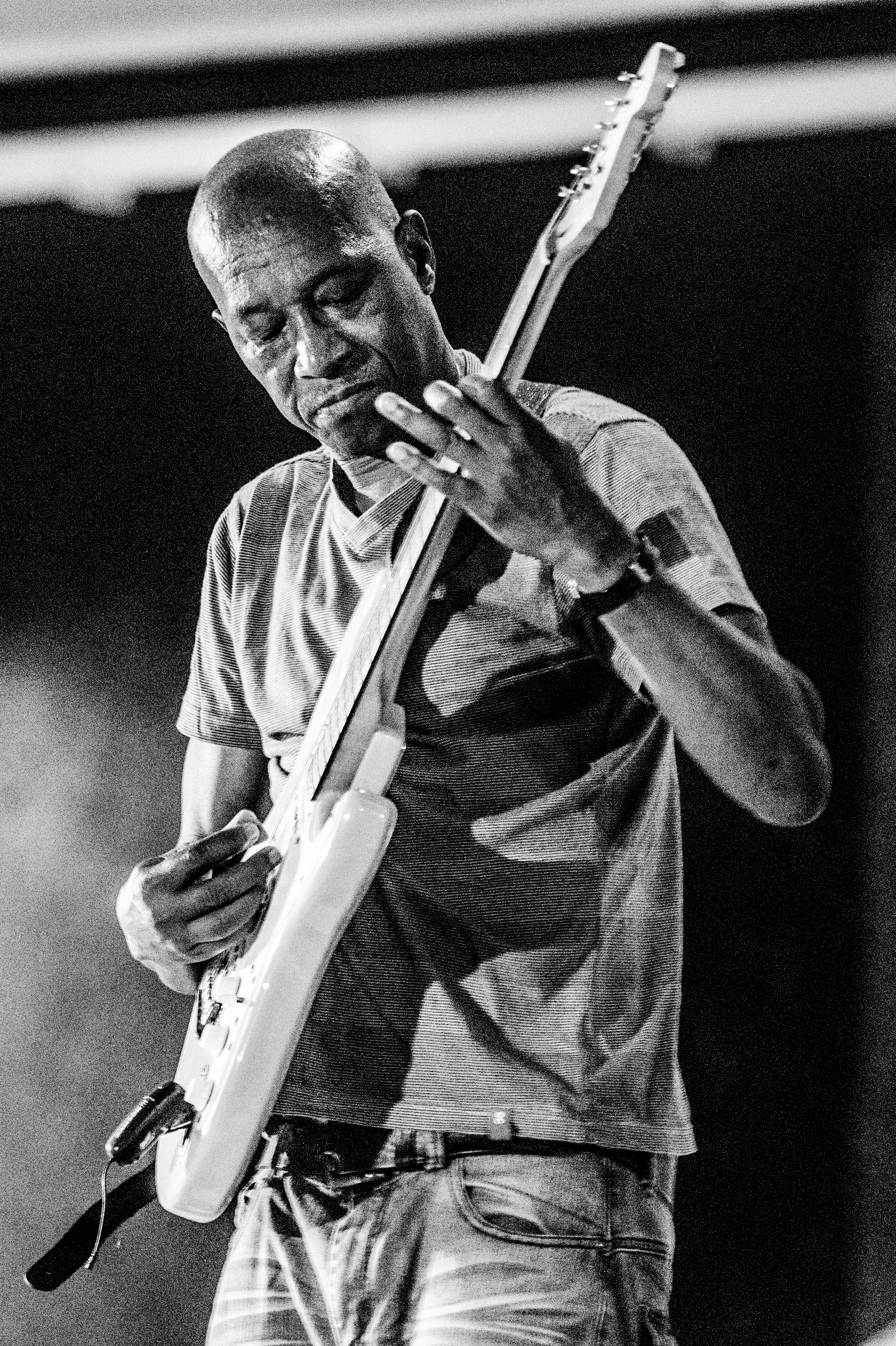
Toriano "Onyan" Edwards

=== Current ===
- Toriano "Onyan" Edwards (lead / rhythm guitars & Lead vocals)
- David "Krokuss, Lord Satellite" "NATURAL RAMPLER" Edwards (bass, vocals)
- Clarence "Oungku" Edwards ( keyboards & vocals)
- Rone "Foxx" Watkins (drums)

=== Past ===
- Clarence "Oungku" Edwards ( keyboards & vocals), now lead singer for band Red Hot Flames
- Rone "Foxx" Watkins (drums)
- Bryan Fontanelle (guitar)
- Onika Bostic (vocals) - died 21 December 2004
- Farmer Nappy
- Sisco
- Seduction (vocals)
- Blade (vocals)

=== Pre 1984 ===
Pre-recording release local live performances Antigua.

- Elton "Sabu"Thomas (drums)
- Jerome "Long Scyant" Thomas(drums)
- Conrad Thomas (drums)
