= Aberdeen, Antigua and Barbuda =

Aberdeen
- Former village
- Location within Antigua
- Coordinates: 17°04′11″N 61°48′35″W
- Country: Antigua and Barbuda
- Parish: Saint John

Population (1856)
  - Total: 46

Aberdeen was a village in Saint John, Antigua and Barbuda. It was located to the immediate northwest of the village of Buckleys and has since largely been absorbed into the community. In the 1856 census, Aberdeen was listed as having a population of 46– 26 males and 20 females in eight homes. The 1970 census grouped the community with Buckleys.
