= Cooks Creek (Antigua) =

Coordinates: 17°06′N 61°52′W

Location
- Country: Antigua and Barbuda

Cooks Creek is a stream of Antigua and Barbuda. It is located on the island of Antigua. Valley Road passes over the stream on Big Creek Bridge. The stream passes through The Flashes before meeting the Caribbean Sea.

== See also ==
- List of rivers of Antigua and Barbuda
