= Green Hill, Antigua and Barbuda =

Coordinates: 17°2′5″N 61°47′7″W

Green Hill
- Village
- Location in Antigua
- Country: Antigua and Barbuda
- Parish: Saint Paul

Area
  - Total: 1.09 km^{2} (0.42 sq mi)

Population (2011)
  - Total: 410

Green Hill is a village in Saint Paul, Antigua and Barbuda. It had a population of 410 people in 2011.

== Geography ==
According to the Antigua and Barbuda Statistics Division, the village had a total area of 1.09 square kilometres in 2011.

== Demographics ==
There were 410 people living in Green Hill as of the 2011 census. The village was 93.78% African, 2.59% other mixed, 2.07% Hispanic, 1.30% other, and 0.26% not stated. The population was born in different countries, including 77.20% in Antigua and Barbuda, 7.51% in Jamaica, 4.15% in Guyana, and 2.33% in Dominica. The population had diverse religious affiliations, including 28.76% Moravian, 19.17% Adventist, 16.06% Anglican, and 7.51% Wesleyan Holiness.

A 2008 study named the village as the most deprived enumeration district in the country outside of St. John's city. Another survey found the district to be upper low income, above areas such as nearby Falmouth and Osbourn.
