= List of rivers of Antigua and Barbuda =

Antigua and Barbuda has one of the driest climates in the Caribbean, and thus, few streams and watercourses compared to its neighbours. While there are some relatively large creeks such as Cooks Creek and Fitches Creek on Antigua, most watercourses on the island are ghauts (/ɡʌt/), a term used in the Caribbean to refer to ravines that send rainwater into a larger creek or the ocean. Freshwater is usually extracted from Antiguan creeks and ghauts after significant rainfall or during parts of the rainy season. These ghauts tend to become saltier the closer they are to the ocean. Barbuda has several unnamed ruts that appear after significant rainfall events.

== Antigua ==
- Ayers Creek
- Cooks Creek
- Indian Creek
- Fitches Creek
- Mercers Creek
- Follys Ghaut (17°02′54.00″N 61°48′42.77″W)
- Bendals Stream (17°04′53.91″N 61°50′01.07″W)
- Big Ghaut
- Piggotts Ghaut
- Cassada Gardens Ghaut
- Potworks Ghaut
- Bristol Ghaut (17°4′16″N 61°43′12″W)
- Black Ghaut (17°4′6″N 61°43′42″W)
- Carrs Ghaut
- Christian Valley Ghaut
- North Sound Stream
- Briggins Stream
- Little Creek
