= Roads in Antigua and Barbuda =

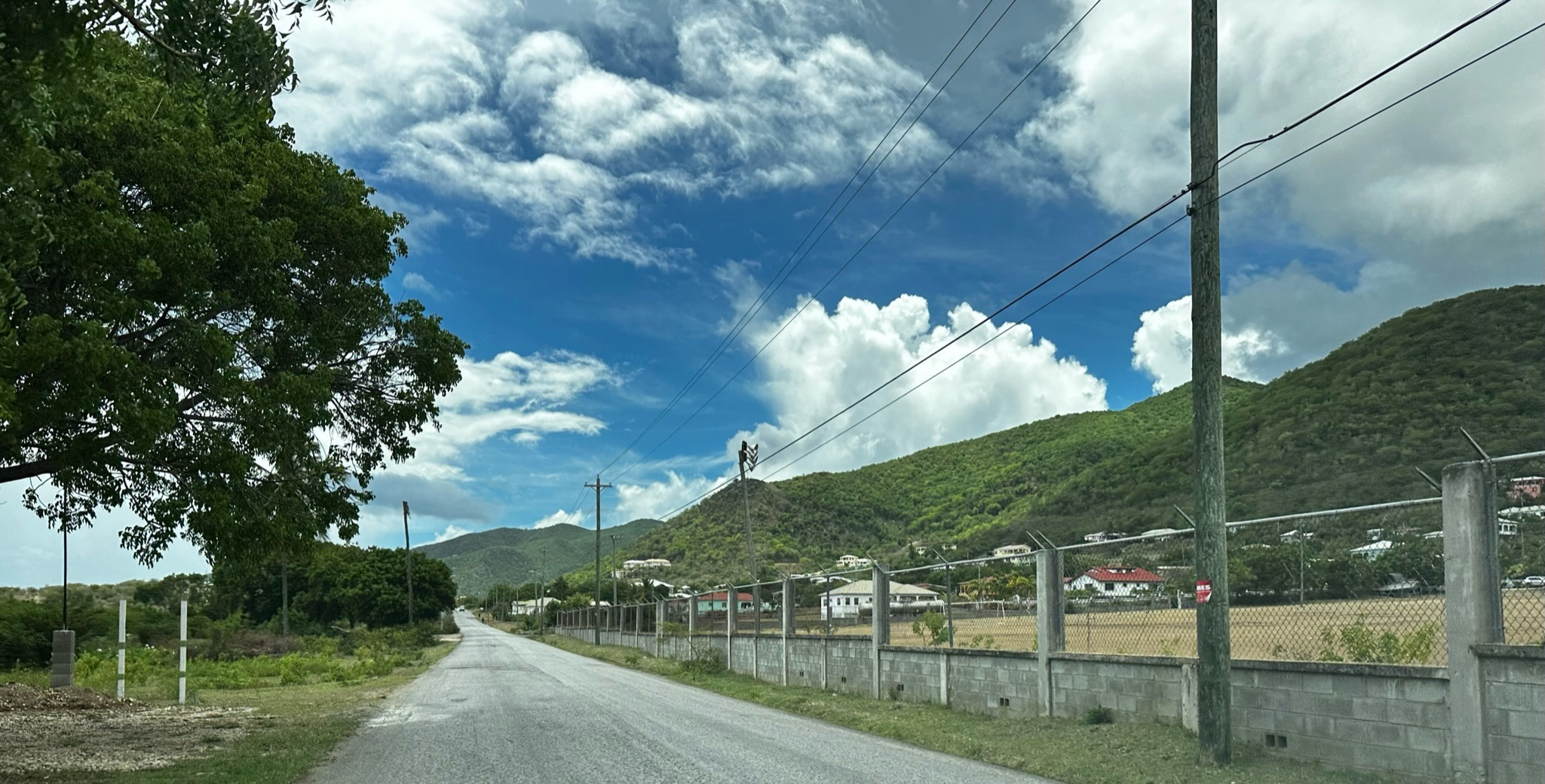
Old Road in Old Road Town, a main road

Antigua and Barbuda has 1,170 km (727 mi) of roads, of which 386 km (240 mi) are paved. Driving is done on the left. There are two primary road networks– one on Antigua and one in Barbuda. Roads in Antigua are maintained by the Ministry of Housing and Works and roads on Barbuda are maintained by the Barbuda Council with the assistance of the central government. The road network in the country is considered to be struggling– more than half of roads are in need of maintenance. There are several classes of roads in the country, including highways, arterial roads, main roads, and local roads. This system is not thoroughly organised and many categories overlap. Legally, there is a system of numbered highways in the country, although in practice these routes are only used for administrative purposes. According to the Public Works and Roads Act, there are three classes of roads– classes 1, 2, and 3. Each road is numbered. This system of numbered roads is further confirmed by the Roads Act. There are 47 such roads. Under the Barbuda Act, the Barbuda Council can sanction highways, although none currently exist on the island. Rather, there are three roads semi-officially classified as arterial roads. Roads in the country are typically named after geographic features, villages, or persons.

Highways and main roads in Antigua mostly radiate from St. John's. Highways originating in the city include All Saints Road, Valley Road, Old Parham Road, the Sir Sydney Walling Highway, and Friars Hill Road. Highways in the country are two-lane– there are no four lane highways in the country. However, there have been proposals to build four-lane highways such as in the Antigua and Barbuda Special Economic Zone. While it is legally permissible to make highways in Barbuda, currently there are only three arterial roads similar in status to main roads on Antigua. River Road connects the village of Codrington to Two Foot Bay Road which leads to the Atlantic coast and Coco Point Road which follows the South Coast. Below highways are the main roads, which link the villages to the highways. Virtually all settlements on Antigua are located on or close to a main road.

== List ==

=== Highway ===
Designation	Class	Name	From	To	Via	Length
Road 1	1	All Saints Road	St. John's	All Saints	St. John's - Potters - All Saints	8.5 km
Road 29	2	Burning Flames Highway	Scotts Hill	Potters	Scotts Hill - Potters	3.4 km
Road 20	1	Factory Road	St. John's	Scotts Hill	St. John's - Scotts Hill	2.4 km
Road 18	2	Friars Hill Road	Cedar Grove	St. John's	Cedar Grove - Cedar Valley - St. John's	4.8 km
N/A	N/A	Irene Carlos Highway	Browns Bay	Freetown	Browns Bay - Freetown	3.1 km
Road 19	1	Old Parham Road	St. John's	Vernons	St. John's - Cassada Gardens - Piggotts - Paynters - Fitches Creek - Parham - Vernons	10.6 km
Road 20	1	Queen Elizabeth Highway	St. John's	St. John's	St. John's	1.1 km
Road 25	2	Sir George Walter Highway	Osbourn	St. Johnston	Osbourn - Skyline - St. Johnston	5.1 km
Road 34	2	Sir Robin Yearwood Highway	Vernons	Long Bay	Vernons - Pares - Mercers Creek - Collins - Glanvilles - Willikies - Long Bay	10.1 km
Road 20	1	Sir Sydney Walling Highway	Scotts Hill	Vernons	Scotts Hill - Piggotts - Paynters - Vernons	6.5 km
Road 2	1 and 2	Valley Road	St. John's	Urlings	St. John's - Bolans - Jolly Harbour - Urlings	14.7 km

=== Arterial roads ===
Arterial roads only exist on Barbuda.

- Coco Point Road
- River Road
- Two Foot Bay Road

=== Main roads ===
- Andy Roberts Drive (segment of Road 2; class 1)
- Bendals Road (Road 6; class 1 and Road 5; class 2)
- Buckleys Road (Road 4; class 1)
- Fort Road (Road 16; class 1)
- Fig Tree Drive (segment of Road 6; class 2)
- Five Islands Road (Road 3; class 1)
- Freemans Village Main Road (segment of Road 12; class 2)
- Jonas Road (Road 14; class 1)
- Lyons Hill Road (segment of Road 31; class 1)
- Marble Hill Road (Road 15; class 2)
- Matthews Road (segment of Road 39; class 1)
- Old Road (segment of Road 2; class 1)
- Potworks Dam Drive
- Sea View Farm Main Road
- St. Philip's Main Road (roads 33 and 41; class 2)
- Tyrell's Road (segment of Road 39; class 1)
