= Pattersons =

Coordinates: 17°1′38.62″N 61°47′14.89″W

- Village
- Interactive map of the Pattersons main place
- Location within Antigua
- Country: Antigua and Barbuda
- Island: Antigua
- Civil parish: Saint Paul
- Time zone: UTC-4 (AST)

Pattersons is a village in Saint Paul, Antigua and Barbuda.

== Demographics ==
Pattersons has one enumeration district, ED 72600.

=== Census data (2011) ===
==== Individual ====
Q48 Ethnic	Counts	%
African descendent	381	91.35%
Caucasian/White	14	3.31%
East Indian/India	2	0.51%
Mixed (Black/White)	1	0.25%
Mixed (Other)	13	3.05%
Hispanic	2	0.51%
Other	1	0.25%
Don't know/Not stated	3	0.76%
Total	417	100.00%

Q55 Internet Use	Counts	%
Yes	233	55.98%
No	181	43.51%
Don't know/Not stated	2	0.51%
Total	417	100.00%

Q49 Religion	Counts	%
Adventist	57	13.78%
Anglican	69	16.58%
Baptist	20	4.85%
Church of God	3	0.77%
Evangelical	2	0.51%
Jehovah Witness	8	2.04%
Methodist	16	3.83%
Moravian	87	20.92%
None/no religion	12	2.81%
Pentecostal	40	9.69%
Rastafarian	17	4.08%
Roman Catholic	13	3.06%
Weslyan Holiness	22	5.36%
Other	14	3.32%
Don't know/Not stated	35	8.42%
Total	416	100.00%
NotApp :	1	

Q71 Country of Citizenship 1	Counts	%
Antigua and Barbuda	361	86.51%
Other Caribbean countries	2	0.51%
Canada	1	0.25%
Dominica	2	0.51%
Dominican Republic	2	0.51%
Guyana	10	2.29%
Jamaica	13	3.05%
Monsterrat	4	1.02%
St. Vincent and the Grenadines	2	0.51%
United Kingdom	7	1.78%
USA	4	1.02%
Other countries	5	1.27%
Not Stated	3	0.76%
Total	417	100.00%

Q71 Country of Citizenship 2 (Country of Second/Dual Citizenship)	Counts	%
Other Caribbean countries	2	4.26%
Canada	2	4.26%
Dominica	4	8.51%
Guyana	13	25.53%
Jamaica	1	2.13%
Monsterrat	1	2.13%
Trinidad and Tobago	1	2.13%
USA	22	44.68%
Other countries	3	6.38%
Total	50	100.00%
NotApp :	367	

Q58. Country of birth	Counts	%
Africa	3	0.76%
Antigua and Barbuda	313	75.06%
Other Caribbean countries	2	0.51%
Canada	3	0.76%
Other European countries	3	0.76%
Dominica	6	1.53%
Dominican Republic	2	0.51%
Guyana	23	5.60%
Jamaica	14	3.31%
Monsterrat	4	1.02%
St. Kitts and Nevis	1	0.25%
St. Vincent and the Grenadines	3	0.76%
Trinidad and Tobago	1	0.25%
United Kingdom	7	1.78%
USA	23	5.60%
USVI United States Virgin Islands	3	0.76%
Not Stated	3	0.76%
Total	417	100.00%

Employment status	Counts	%
Employed	205	65.20%
Unemployed	24	7.77%
Inactive	82	26.01%
Not stated	3	1.01%
Total	314	100.00%
NotApp :	103	

==== Household ====
There are 149 households in Pattersons.

Total number of persons	Counts	%
1	47	31.54%
2	36	24.16%
3	22	14.77%
4	21	14.09%
5	14	9.40%
6	4	2.68%
7	4	2.68%
8	1	0.67%
Total	149	100.00%

Q4 Year built	Counts	%
Before 1980	10	6.71%
1980 - 1989	17	11.41%
1990 - 1999	53	35.57%
2000 - 2006	32	21.48%
Year 2007	5	3.36%
Year 2008	5	3.36%
Year 2009	3	2.01%
Year 2010	4	2.68%
Don't Know/not stated	20	13.42%
Total	149	100.00%

Q11 Garbage disposal	Counts	%
Garbage truck Private	2	1.34%
Garbage truck Public	139	93.29%
Other (inc. burning, burying, compost, dumping)	7	4.70%
Don't know/Not stated	1	0.67%
Total	149	100.00%

Q23 3a Desktop Computer	Counts	%
Yes	50	33.56%
No	99	66.44%
Total	149	100.00%

Q23 3b Laptop Computer	Counts	%
Yes	59	39.60%
No	90	60.40%
Total	149	100.00%

Q23 9 Mobile Devices	Counts	%
Yes	140	93.96%
No	9	6.04%
Total	149	100.00%

Q23 10 Radio	Counts	%
Yes	98	65.77%
No	51	34.23%
Total	149	100.00%

Q25 4 Internet access	Counts	%
No	76	51.01%
Yes	56	37.58%
Don't know/not declared	17	11.41%
Total	149	100.00%

Q24 Motor Vehicles	Counts	%
0	48	35.04%
1	51	37.23%
2	27	19.71%
3	6	4.38%
4 or more	5	3.65%
Total	137	100.00%
Missing :	12	
