= Arawak Motors =

Antiguan car manufacturer

Arawak Motors Ltd. was an importer and manufacturer of automobiles on the Caribbean island of Antigua, which operated in the 1970s and 1980s.

== Company history ==
The company was based in St. John's in Antigua. At that time, the island was an associated state, which gained independence in 1981. It also manufactured automobiles and marketed them as Arawak. Arawak Motors also imported and sold Chrysler vehicles. The company produced vehicles from around 1976 until 1984.

== Vehicles ==
The only model the company produced was the Hustler, similar in style to the Mini Moke. Many of the vehicle's parts came from the Hillman Imp. This included the four-cylinder rear engine with 875 cm^{3} displacement. The open body was made of fiberglass. After the Imp discontinued production, the Hustler II was designed, which likely did not enter series production. It had a four-cylinder engine from the Vauxhall Viva with 1256 cm^{3} displacement, which was installed in the front of the vehicle.
