= 2025 Antiguan and Barbudan census =

2025 Population and Housing Census
- 25 June 2025
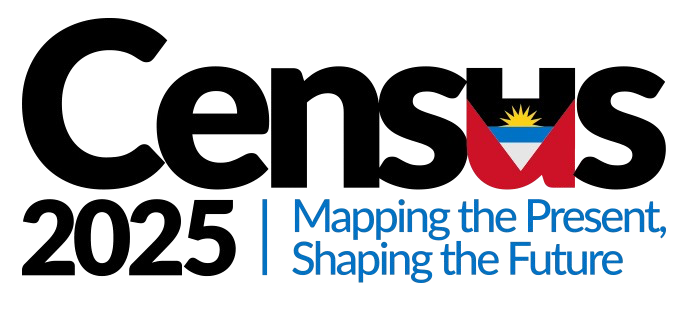
- Logo of the 2025 census

General information
- Country: Antigua and Barbuda

The fourth national census is being conducted in Antigua and Barbuda from 25 June 2025 (reference day). While originally intended to end on 30 December 2025, fieldwork is ongoing as of June 2026 to account for absent households. The census was originally intended to be held with a reference date of 28 May 2021, although due to delays caused by the COVID-19 pandemic, the date of the census was repeatedly delayed until March 2025. This is the first census overseen by the National Bureau of Statistics and preliminary results were originally expected to be released starting in the first quarter of 2026. The population is being counted in 400 enumeration districts.

== Background ==
The census was originally scheduled to be held starting on 28 May 2021, exactly ten years after the 2011 census. However, due to delays caused by the COVID-19 pandemic, the census was originally rescheduled to 2022 by the chief statistician. The census was later delayed to 2023, although this census also never happened. The census continued to be delayed in 2024, before the pilot phase finally commenced on 30 November 2024. In July 2024, a new law was passed to assist in the Statistics Division's reform to the National Bureau of Statistics, which had been mandated in 2013. After years of delays, date of the census was revealed on 25 March 2025 along with the rebranding of the Statistics Division. The slogan of the census, "Mapping the Present, Shaping the Future", was coined by Asahi Joseph who received a $500 prize.

== Questionnaire ==
The census asks various questions on household characteristics, mortality, domestic and international migration, ethnicity, religion, income levels, and various other subjects.
