= Herberts, Antigua and Barbuda =

Town in Antigua and Barbuda

Herberts
- major settlement
- Location within Antigua
- Coordinates: 17°05′42″N 61°48′54″W
- Country: Antigua and Barbuda
- Island: Antigua
- Parish: Saint John
- Enumeration districts: 33404, 33405

Area
  - Total: 1.025 km^{2} (0.396 sq mi)

Population
  - Total: 741
  - Density: 723/km^{2} (1,870/sq mi)

Herberts is a major settlement in Saint John, Antigua and Barbuda.

== Geography ==
Herberts has an area of 1.025 km^{2}.

== Demographics ==
Herberts has two enumeration districts, 33404 Belmont_Herberts_North, and 33405 Belmont_Herberts_South.

Ethnic
Q48 Ethnic	Counts	%
African descendent	624	84.20%
Caucasian/White	4	0.60%
East Indian/India	22	2.98%
Mixed (Black/White)	1	0.15%
Mixed (Other)	65	8.79%
Hispanic	8	1.04%
Other	6	0.75%
Don't know/Not stated	11	1.49%
Total	741	100.00%

Herberts has an ethnic diversity similar to the national average.

Religion
Q49 Religion	Counts	%
Adventist	71	9.68%
Anglican	31	4.24%
Baptist	44	6.05%
Church of God	44	6.05%
Evangelical	6	0.76%
Jehovah Witness	19	2.57%
Methodist	17	2.27%
Moravian	83	11.35%
Nazarene	3	0.45%
None/no religion	33	4.54%
Pentecostal	134	18.31%
Rastafarian	6	0.76%
Roman Catholic	50	6.81%
Wesleyan Holiness	14	1.97%
Other	50	6.81%
Don't know/Not stated	127	17.40%
Total	730	100.00%
NotApp :	11	

Like many other Antiguan towns, the amount of diversity in religious denominations is high, with Pentecostalism making up the largest religious identity.

Country of birth
Q58. Country of birth	Counts	%
Africa	4	0.60%
Antigua and Barbuda	435	58.72%
Other Caribbean countries	2	0.30%
Other Asian countries	1	0.15%
Dominica	56	7.60%
Dominican Republic	4	0.60%
Guyana	82	11.03%
Jamaica	99	13.41%
Monsterrat	9	1.19%
St. Kitts and Nevis	2	0.30%
St. Vincent and the Grenadines	4	0.60%
Trinidad and Tobago	3	0.45%
United Kingdom	9	1.19%
USA	9	1.19%
USVI United States Virgin Islands	3	0.45%
Not Stated	17	2.24%
Total	741	100.00%

Herberts has a highly above average amount of diversity in country of birth, with only 58.72% of Herberts residents having been born in Antigua and Barbuda. The second largest country of birth group is Jamaica.

Country of Citizenship
Q71 Country of Citizenship 1	Counts	%
Antigua and Barbuda	573	77.35%
Other Caribbean countries	3	0.45%
Other Asian and Middle Eastern countries	1	0.15%
Dominica	21	2.83%
Guyana	40	5.37%
Jamaica	67	9.09%
Monsterrat	6	0.75%
St. Vincent and the Grenadines	2	0.30%
United Kingdom	4	0.60%
USA	7	0.89%
Other countries	4	0.60%
Not Stated	12	1.64%
Total	741	100.00%

Country of Second Citizenship
Q71 Country of Citizenship 2	Counts	%
Other Caribbean countries	2	1.87%
Canada	1	0.93%
Other Asian and Middle Eastern countries	2	1.87%
Dominica	25	21.50%
Dominican Republic	2	1.87%
Guyana	28	23.36%
Jamaica	21	17.76%
St. Vincent and the Grenadines	1	0.93%
Trinidad and Tobago	4	3.74%
United Kingdom	9	7.48%
USA	15	13.08%
Other countries	7	5.61%
Total	118	100.00%
NotApp :	623	
