= Valley Road (Antigua) =

Highway in Antigua

Coordinates: 17°4′52.81″N 61°51′32.05″W

Road 2
- Valley Road
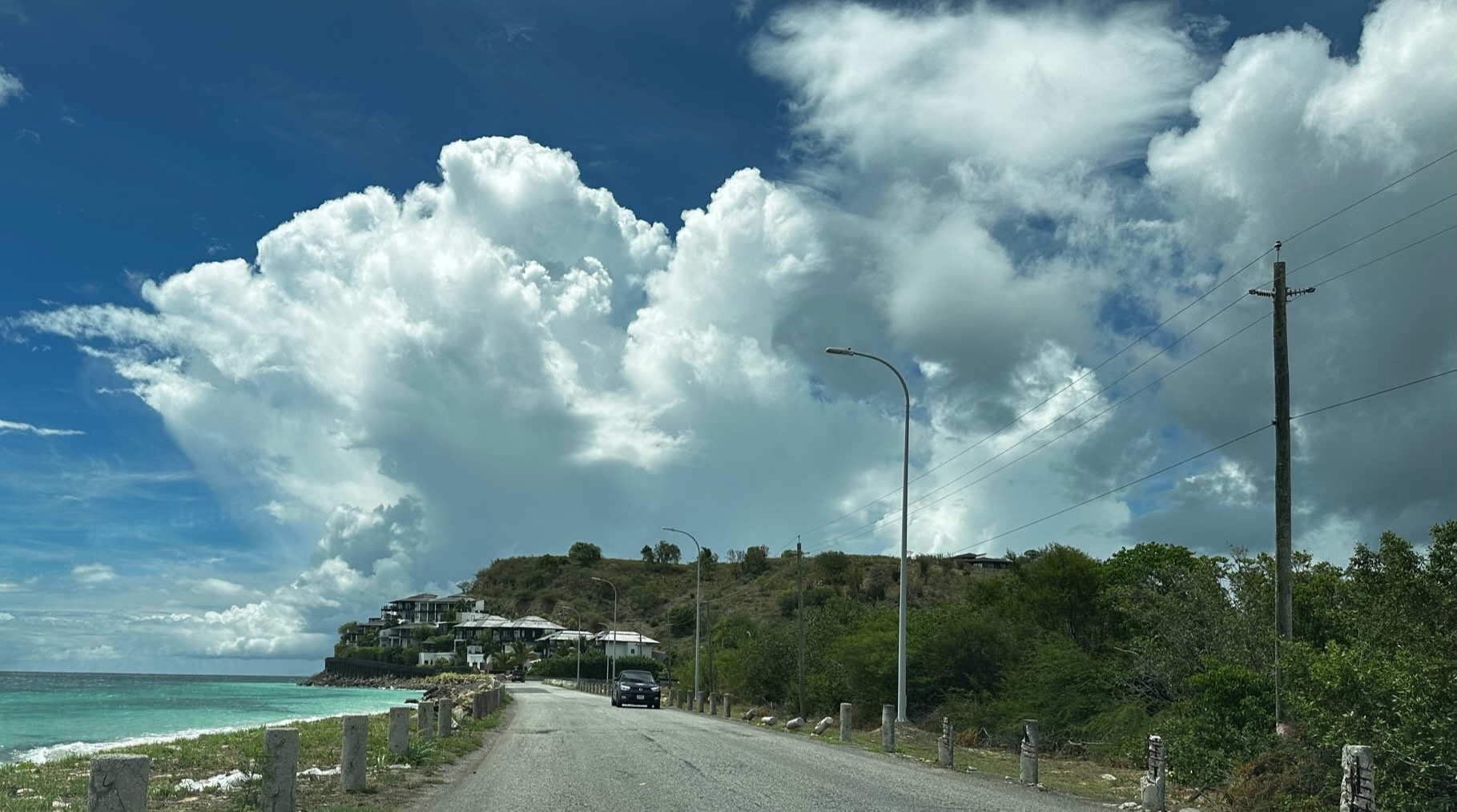
- Northbound near Darkwood Beach

Route information
- Length: 14.7 km (9.1 mi)

Major junctions
- From: Market Street in St. John's
- To: Andy Roberts Drive in Urlings

Location
- Country: Antigua and Barbuda

Highway system
- Roads in Antigua and Barbuda

Valley Road is a highway in Antigua. One of the busiest roads in the country, it links St. John's to Urlings in the southern area of Saint Mary. Valley Road starts at Market Street in downtown St. John's and continues south to the junction with Tindale Road at 1.1 kilometres. At 2.5 kilometres there is a second junction with Tindale Road. The road crosses over Cooks Creek at Big Creek Bridge in Creekside at 3.6 kilometres. The road passes through Jennings, central Bolans, Jolly Harbour (with a junction at 8.8 km) and then follows Antigua's southwest coast through Crabs Hill and Johnsons Point. The road ends at Andy Roberts Drive in Urlings. The road has double-lane traffic for the entirety of the route. The road is the arterial road of Saint Mary.

== Junctions ==
Parish	Location	km	mi	Destinations	Notes
Saint John	St. John's	0.0	0.0		
Saint John	St. John's	1.1	0.68	Tindale Road	
Saint John	St. John's	2.5	1.6	Tindale Road	
Saint Mary	Jolly Harbour	8.8	5.5	Palm Beach Drive	
Saint Mary	Urlings	14.7	9.1	Andy Roberts Drive	
1.000 mi = 1.609 km; 1.000 km = 0.621 mi
