= 2025 Alberta municipal censuses =

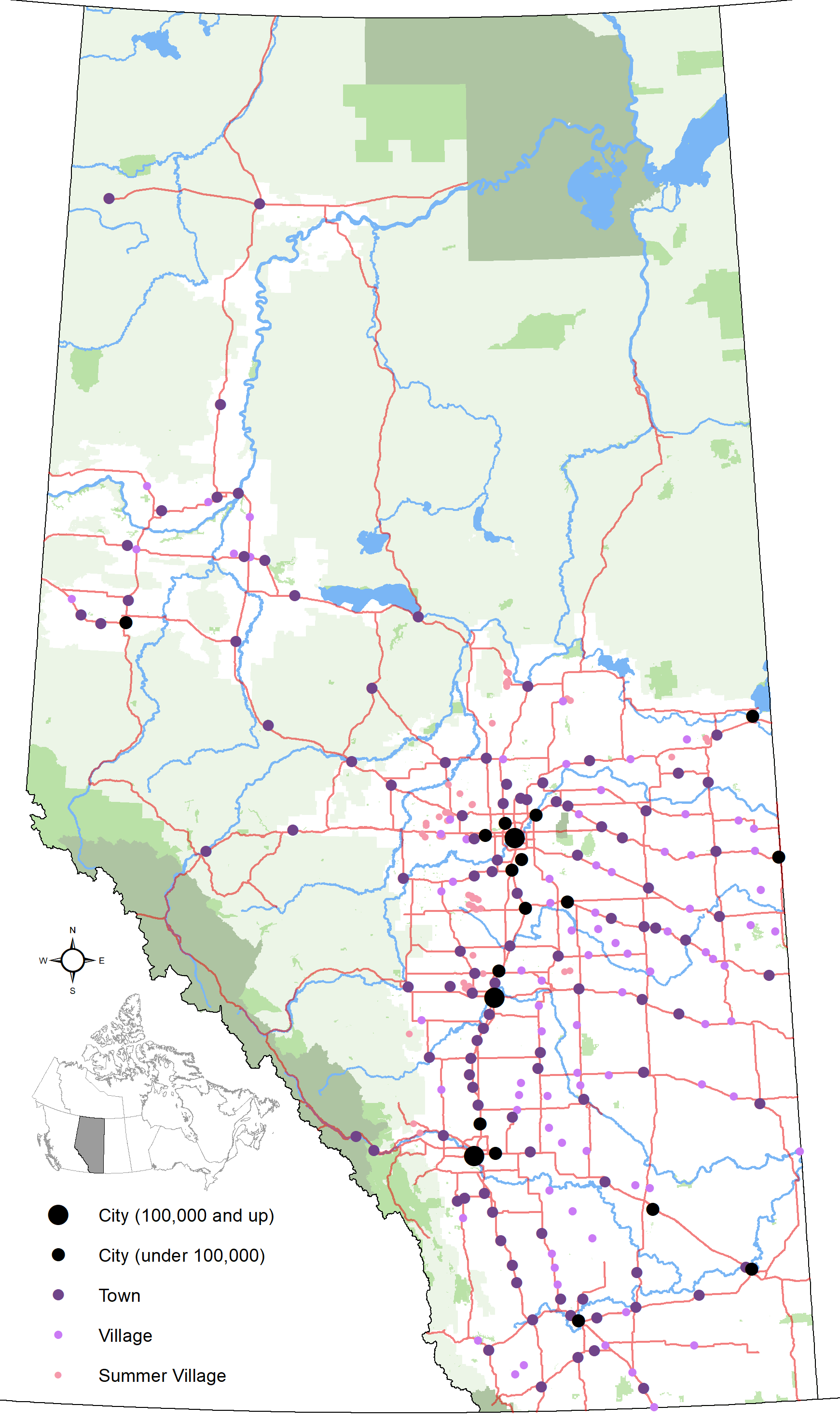
- Distribution of Alberta's 260 urban municipalities

Alberta has provincial legislation allowing its municipalities to conduct municipal censuses. Municipalities choose to conduct their own censuses for multiple reasons such as to better inform municipal service planning and provision, inform an electoral boundary review, or to simply update their populations since the last federal census.

Alberta began the year of 2025 with 340 municipalities. Of these, eight conducted a municipal census in 2025 including four cities, one specialized municipality, two municipal districts, and one village.

== Municipal census results ==
The following summarizes the results of those 2025 municipal censuses published to date.

2025 municipal census summary				2021 federal census comparison				Previous municipal census comparison			
Municipality	Status	Census date	2025 pop.	2021 pop.	Absolute growth	Absolute change	Annual growth rate	Prev. pop.	Prev. census year	Absolute growth	Annual growth rate
Airdrie	City	April 1, 2025	90,044	74,100	15,944	21.5%	5.0%	85,805	2024	4,239	4.9%
Camrose	City	April 14, 2025	19,984	18,772	1,212	6.5%	1.6%	18,044	2016	1,940	1.1%
Chestermere	City	May 1, 2025	32,255	22,163	10,092	45.5%	9.8%	28,129	2024	4,126	14.7%
Delia	Village	March 20, 2025	219	152	67	44.1%	9.6%	198	1992	21	0.3%
Northern Sunrise County	Municipal district	May 1, 2025	1,753	1,711	42	2.5%	0.6%	1,933	2013	−180	−0.8%
Wetaskiwin	City	May 1, 2025	13,409	12,594	815	6.5%	1.6%	12,621	2014	788	0.6%
RM of Wood Buffalo	Specialized municipality	April 1, 2025	78,979	72,326	6,653	9.2%	2.2%	75,555	2021	3,424	1.1%
Woodlands County	Municipal district	May 1, 2025	5,254	4,558	696	15.3%	3.6%	4,612	2014	642	1.2%

== See also ==
- 2025 Alberta municipal elections
- List of communities in Alberta
