= Scotts Hill, Antigua and Barbuda =

Coordinates: 17°6′30″N 61°49′21″W

Scotts Hill
- Village
- Interactive map of Scotts Hill
- Country: Antigua and Barbuda
- Parish: Saint John

Area
  - Total: 1.26 km^{2} (0.49 sq mi)

Population (2011)
  - Total: 436

Scotts Hill is a village in Saint John, Antigua and Barbuda. It had a population of 436 people in 2011.

== Geography ==
According to the Antigua and Barbuda Statistics Division, the village had a total area of 1.26 square kilometres in 2011.

== Demographics ==
There were 436 people living in Scotts Hill as of the 2011 census. The village was 71.14% African, 15.19% other mixed, 3.29% mixed black/white, 2.53% white, 1.77% East Indian, 1.52% Syrian/Lebanese, 1.27% Hispanic, 1.01% other, and 2.28% not stated. The population was born in different countries, including 65.32% in Antigua and Barbuda, 5.57% in the United States, 4.56% in Trinidad and Tobago, 4.05% in Guyana, and 3.54% in the United Kingdom. The population had diverse religious affiliations, including 17.53% Roman Catholic, 16.75% Anglican, and 10.57% Adventist.
