= Table Hill Gardens =

Coordinates: 17°2′58″N 61°45′50″W

- Village
- Potworks Dam Drive in August 2026
- Interactive map of the Table Hill Gardens main place
- Location within Antigua
- Country: Antigua and Barbuda
- Parish: Saint Paul

Area
  - Total: 12.4 km^{2} (4.8 sq mi)

Population (2011)
  - Total: 191

Table Hill Gardens (Note: Also known as Table Hill Gordon) is a village in Saint Paul, Antigua and Barbuda. It had a population of 191 people in 2011.

== Geography ==
According to the Antigua and Barbuda Statistics Division, the village had a total area of 12.4 square kilometres.

== Demographics ==
According to the 2011 census, Table Hill Gardens was home to 191 people. The population's ethnic makeup was as follows: 97.22% African, 1.67% other mixed, 0.56% Hispanic, and not specified (0.56%). The country of birth makeup was: Antigua and Barbuda (91.11%), Dominica (1.11%), Jamaica (5.00%), Guyana (1.67%), St. Kitts and Nevis (0.56%), and St. Vincent and the Grenadines (0.56%). The three largest religious groups were: Moravian (30.00%), Pentecostal (15.56%), Adventist (12.78%), in addition to 4.44% of the population being irreligious and 1.11% of the population being Rastafarian.
