= Fig Tree Drive =

Official historic site of Antigua and Barbuda

Coordinates: 17°2′10″N 61°49′49″W

Road 6
- Fig Tree Drive
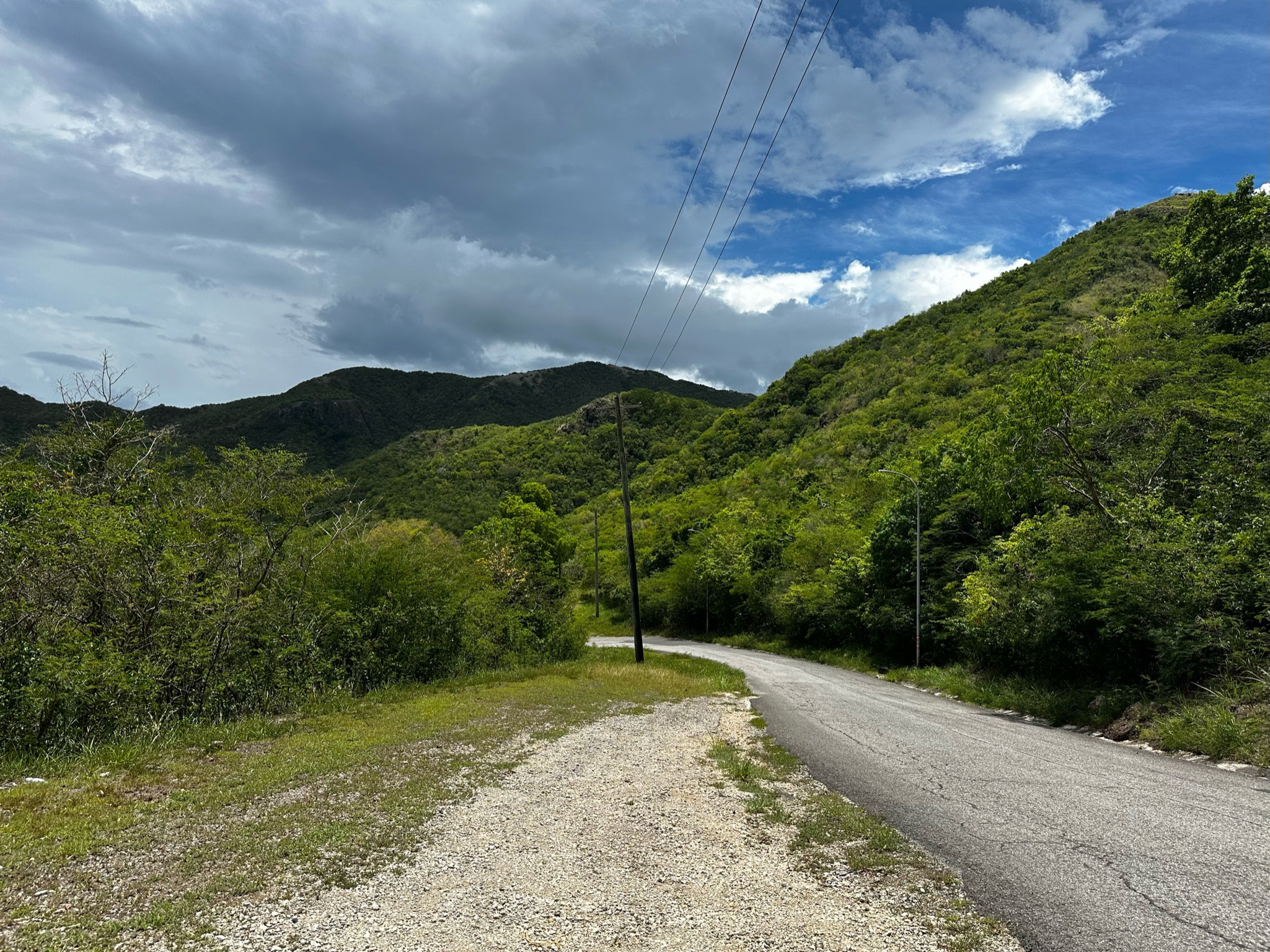
- Fig Tree Drive in June 2023 near John Hughes

Route information
- Length: 7.5 km (4.7 mi)

Major junctions
- From: Road 39 in Swetes
- To: Old Road in Old Road Town

Location
- Country: Antigua and Barbuda

Highway system
- Roads in Antigua and Barbuda

Fig Tree Drive is a scenic road and official historic site in the Leeward Islands moist forests of Saint Mary, Antigua and Barbuda. The road is about five miles long and is located between Swetes and Old Road, cutting through the mountainous village of John Hughes and the Wallings forest. It is mostly canopied and is known for its views of the rainforests of the Shekerley Mountains.
