= Tyrells =

- Village
- Interactive map of the Tyrells main place
- Coordinates: 17°02′42″N 61°47′42″W
- Country: Antigua and Barbuda
- Parish: Saint Paul

Area
  - Total: 0.71 km^{2} (0.27 sq mi)

Population (2011)
  - Total: 396

Tyrells is a village in Saint Paul, Antigua and Barbuda. It had a population of 396 people in 2011.

== Geography ==
According to the Antigua and Barbuda Statistics Division, the village had a total area of 0.71 square kilometres in 2011.

== Demographics ==
There were 396 people living in Tyrells as of the 2011 census. The village was 91.42% African, 2.41% mixed black/white, 2.14% other mixed, 1.34% East Indian, 0.80% Hispanic, 0.80% other, 0.80% not stated, and 0.27% white. The population was born in different countries, including 79.89% in Antigua and Barbuda, 4.83% in Guyana, and 4.02% in Jamaica. The population had diverse religious affiliations, including 20.64% Moravian, 19.57% Adventist, and 12.60% Anglican.
