= Dieppe Bay, Antigua and Barbuda =

Coordinates: 17°0′39.93″N 61°47′22.35″W

Dieppe Bay
- Village
- Interactive map of the Dieppe Bay main place
- Country: Antigua and Barbuda
- Parish: Saint Paul

Area
  - Total: 4.3 km^{2} (1.7 sq mi)

Population (2011)
  - Total: 64

Dieppe Bay is a village in Saint Paul, Antigua and Barbuda. It had a population of 64 people in 2011.

== Geography ==
According to the Antigua and Barbuda Statistics Division, the village had a total area of 4.2 square kilometres.

== Demographics ==
There were 64 people living in Dieppe Bay as of the 2011 census. The village had a diverse ethnic composition, with 58.33% African, 35.00% white, 3.33% other mixed, and 3.33% Hispanic. The population was born in different countries, including 41.67% in Antigua and Barbuda, 23.33% in the United Kingdom, 11.67% in the United States, and 5.00% in Dominica. The population had diverse religious affiliations, including 20.00% Roman Catholic, 18.33% Anglican, 15.00% Adventist, 13.33% Moravian, and 10.00% irreligious.
