= History of Antigua and Barbuda (1833–1870) =

Antigua
- 1833–1870
- Demonyms: Antiguan; Barbudan
- History
  - Established: 1833
  - Disestablished: 1870
- Today part of: Antigua and Barbuda

This article covers the history of Antigua and Barbuda from emancipation in 1833 until the British Leeward Islands were federalized in the early 1870s. During this era, the economy was significantly reformed, and many Afro-Antiguan villages were established. Antigua was often formally called the Colony of Antigua during this period. This is also when Barbuda began to merge with Antigua, and the communal land system was established.

== Aftermath of emancipation (1833–1850) ==
In 1833, a significant earthquake hit Antigua, followed by a drought, destroying the prospects of the white planters. On 1 August 1834, slavery was abolished, and all slaves in the country received immediate freedom. That day, most went to church and the planters went to their own chapels. In Bridgetown, the Wesleyan Chapel was decorated and people were entertained with food. It was expected there would be a relaxation of labour the week after, however, productivity for the most part remained the same. Around this time, there was a significant reform of the country's laws, including legislation to establish an electoral system. The Benna genre of music also emerged. On 1 July 1838, the island's militia was abolished due to conflict no longer being prevalent.

The first village to emerge after emancipation was Liberta in 1834, followed by Freemans. When certain former slaves were denied land, they sought land in the Shekerley Mountains. These villages did not expand much though, until free lands were finally released by the government. In 1838, the emancipated Africans owned 1,037 homes in twenty-seven villages. In 1842, former settlements like Bermudian Valley and Bridgetown had gone extinct. The people of Bridgetown were moved to Freetown by 1843.

== Modernisation (1851–1870) ==
In 1858, there was an uprising in Point between Antiguan dockworkers and Barbudan dockworkers due to job competition. The Antiguan dockworkers later began to attack other minority groups. In 1859, the Barbuda (Extension of Laws of Antigua) Act was passed, beginning the merger process between Antigua and Barbuda. On 1 August 1860, the island reverted to the British crown, ending Codrington rule and officially uniting the two islands. In 1871, the British Leeward Islands were federalized.
