= Body Ponds =

Official historic site of Antigua and Barbuda

- Location within Antigua and Barbuda
- 17°02′54.8″N 61°49′06.4″W
- Location: Saint John, Antigua and Barbuda

History
- Built: 1679

Historical Site of Antigua and Barbuda

Body Ponds is an official historic site in Saint John, Antigua and Barbuda. The sugar plantation here was established in 1679. The sugar mill tower continues to stand and 102 people were enslaved here at the time of emancipation.
