= Creekside, Antigua and Barbuda =

Coordinates: 17°5′44″N 61°50′41″W

Creekside Kreexaid
- Village
- The village in December 2021
- Interactive map of the Creekside main place
- Country: Antigua and Barbuda
- Parish: Saint John

Area
  - Total: 0.83 km^{2} (0.32 sq mi)

Population (2011)
  - Total: 487

Creekside (/kɹiːksaɪd/; North Antiguan: Kreexaid) is a village in Saint John, Antigua and Barbuda. It had a population of 487 people in 2011.

== Geography ==
According to the Antigua and Barbuda Statistics Division, the village had a total area of 0.83 square kilometres in 2011.

== Demographics ==
There were 487 people living in Creekside as of the 2011 census. 90.70% of the population was African. The population was born in different countries, including 67.8% in Antigua and Barbuda and 5.90% in Jamaica. The population had diverse religious affiliations, including 23.18% Adventist, 10.91% Anglican, 10.45% Catholic, and 9.09% Rastafarian.
