= Clarkes Hill, Antigua and Barbuda =

Clark's Hill
- Village
- Clarkes Hill
- Location in Antigua

- Location within Antigua and Barbuda
- Coordinates: 17.073611°N 61.799167°W
- Country: Antigua and Barbuda
- Island: Antigua
- Civil parish: Saint John Parish

Government
  - Type: Village Council (possibly dissolved)

Population (2011)
  - Total: 401
- Time zone: UTC-4 (AST)

Clarkes Hill is a village in Saint John Parish, Antigua and Barbuda.

== Demographics ==
Clarkes Hill has one enumeration district, ED 33800 Clarkes Hill.

Ethnic
| Q48 Ethnic | Counts | % |
|---|---|---|
| African descendent | 364 | 90.91% |
| Caucasian/White | 7 | 1.65% |
| East Indian/India | 10 | 2.48% |
| Mixed (Other) | 18 | 4.41% |
| Other | 1 | 0.28% |
| Don't know/Not stated | 1 | 0.28% |
| Total | 401 | 100.00% |

Religion
| Q49 Religion | Counts | % |
|---|---|---|
| Adventist | 94 | 23.42% |
| Anglican | 76 | 19.01% |
| Baptist | 19 | 4.68% |
| Church of God | 3 | 0.83% |
| Jehovah Witness | 13 | 3.31% |
| Methodist | 10 | 2.48% |
| Moravian | 13 | 3.31% |
| Nazarene | 20 | 4.96% |
| None/no religion | 1 | 0.28% |
| Pentecostal | 35 | 8.82% |
| Rastafarian | 2 | 0.55% |
| Roman Catholic | 22 | 5.51% |
| Weslyan Holiness | 13 | 3.31% |
| Other | 53 | 13.22% |
| Don't know/Not stated | 25 | 6.34% |
| Total | 401 | 100.00% |

Country of birth
| Q58. Country of birth | Counts | % |
|---|---|---|
| Other Latin or North American countries | 1 | 0.28% |
| Antigua and Barbuda | 295 | 73.55% |
| Other Caribbean countries | 3 | 0.83% |
| Canada | 1 | 0.28% |
| Dominica | 20 | 4.96% |
| Guyana | 30 | 7.44% |
| Jamaica | 18 | 4.41% |
| Monsterrat | 4 | 1.10% |
| St. Kitts and Nevis | 2 | 0.55% |
| St. Vincent and the Grenadines | 3 | 0.83% |
| Trinidad and Tobago | 2 | 0.55% |
| United Kingdom | 3 | 0.83% |
| USA | 12 | 3.03% |
| USVI United States Virgin Islands | 3 | 0.83% |
| Not Stated | 2 | 0.55% |
| Total | 401 | 100.00% |

Country of Citizenship
| Q71 Country of Citizenship 1 | Counts | % |
|---|---|---|
| Antigua and Barbuda | 348 | 86.78% |
| Other Caribbean countries | 3 | 0.83% |
| Canada | 1 | 0.28% |
| Dominica | 9 | 2.20% |
| Guyana | 18 | 4.41% |
| Jamaica | 10 | 2.48% |
| Monsterrat | 2 | 0.55% |
| St. Vincent and the Grenadines | 2 | 0.55% |
| Trinidad and Tobago | 1 | 0.28% |
| USA | 4 | 1.10% |
| Other countries | 1 | 0.28% |
| Not Stated | 1 | 0.28% |
| Total | 401 | 100.00% |

Country of Second/Dual Citizenship
| Q71 Country of Citizenship 2 (Country of Second/Dual Citizenship) | Counts | % |
|---|---|---|
| Other Caribbean countries | 3 | 4.92% |
| Canada | 1 | 1.64% |
| Dominica | 10 | 14.75% |
| Guyana | 13 | 19.67% |
| Jamaica | 8 | 11.48% |
| St. Vincent and the Grenadines | 2 | 3.28% |
| Trinidad and Tobago | 2 | 3.28% |
| United Kingdom | 3 | 4.92% |
| USA | 22 | 32.79% |
| Other countries | 2 | 3.28% |
| Total | 67 | 100.00% |
| NotApp : | 333 | |

Internet Use
| Q55 Internet Use | Counts | % |
|---|---|---|
| Yes | 214 | 53.44% |
| No | 178 | 44.35% |
| Don't know/Not stated | 9 | 2.20% |
| Total | 401 | 100.00% |
