= Village councils (Antigua and Barbuda) =

Village councils in Antigua and Barbuda were local government bodies responsible for the administration of the villages on the Island of Antigua. Village councils were responsible for the delivery of public services, such as waste management, road maintenance, and community development projects, to the residents of the village. Village councils were also responsible for collecting taxes and fees from residents, as well as for creating and enforcing local by-laws and regulations. The members of the village councils were elected by the residents of the village, and they served a specified term of office. The village councils worked in collaboration with the national government of Antigua and Barbuda to ensure the effective delivery of services to the communities they serve.

Thirteen councils were established in 1946 and 1947.

A system of village councils was created by the Village Councils Act (1945). While all village councils are inactive, the legislation has never been repealed.

== History ==
By 1954, the councils were deemed a failure.

Ivor Heath, the UNDP's head, vowed to decentralize the government in the 1980s if his group were to win power. In order to provide communities a kind of local government and more responsibility over their own concerns, he specifically suggested a system of village councils. Only Barbuda had local self-government in the late 1980s; the other communities were governed by the Ministry of Home Affairs.

All village councils are currently inactive in Antigua and Barbuda, and the current Prime Minister Gaston Browne has expressed opposition to the reestablishment of village councils.
