= Central Plain (Antigua) =

Coordinates: 17°04′20″N 61°48′10″W

Central Plain Senchaal Plien
- Region
- Country: Antigua and Barbuda
- Island: Antigua

Area
  - Total: 91.91 km^{2} (35.49 sq mi)

Population (2011)
  - Total: 44,097
  - Density: 479.8/km^{2} (1,243/sq mi)

The Central Plain (North Antiguan: Senchaal Plien) is a region in Antigua. It is home to the majority of people in Antigua and Barbuda, with the highest concentration of settlements. Located in the eponymous geologic region, it stretches from St. John's in the northwest to English Harbour in the southwest. Most settlement in the area is based around All Saints Road and its offshoots. In 2011, the area was home to 44,097 people in about 92 square kilometres, about 52% of the national population. The main settlements are St. John's, Piggotts, All Saints, Swetes, Liberta, Falmouth, and English Harbour. The region makes up about a third of the country's area and stretches through all parishes except Saint Philip.

== Geography ==
The area coincides with the Central Plain Group, a geologic area marked by sedimentary rocks and some limestone. The Central Plain is a lowland with some of the most fertile soils on the island due to the presence of volcanic ash.

== Demographics ==
The Central Plain had a population of 44,097 in 2011 over 91.91 square kilometres. The following ethnic groups were present in the area: African descendants (87.08%), other mixed (3.73%), Hispanics (3.43%), whites (1.15%), East Indians (1.13%), other (0.96%), mixed black/white (0.96%), unknown (0.94%), and Syrian or Lebanese (0.61%). 65.61% of the population was born in Antigua and Barbuda, with other birth locations including Guyana (8.72%), Jamaica (5.82%), Dominica (4.88%), the Dominican Republic (3.04%), and the United States (2.66%). Most of the population are Protestant Christians, with Anglicans (15.04%), Pentecostalists (13.40%), and Adventists (12.13%) being the three largest religious groups in the area.
