= Central Plain Group =

Geologic group in Antigua and Barbuda

- Stratigraphic range: Oligocene
- Type: Group
- Underlies: Antigua Formation

Lithology
- Primary: Limestone

Location
- Coordinates: 17.1°N 61.8°W
- Region: Antigua
- Country: Antigua and Barbuda
- Central Plain Group (Antigua and Barbuda)

The Central Plain Group is a geologic group in Antigua and Barbuda. It preserves fossils dating back to the Oligocene period.

== See also ==
- Central Plain (Antigua)
- List of fossiliferous stratigraphic units in Antigua and Barbuda
