= John Hughes, Antigua and Barbuda =

John Hughes Jaan Yuuz
- Village
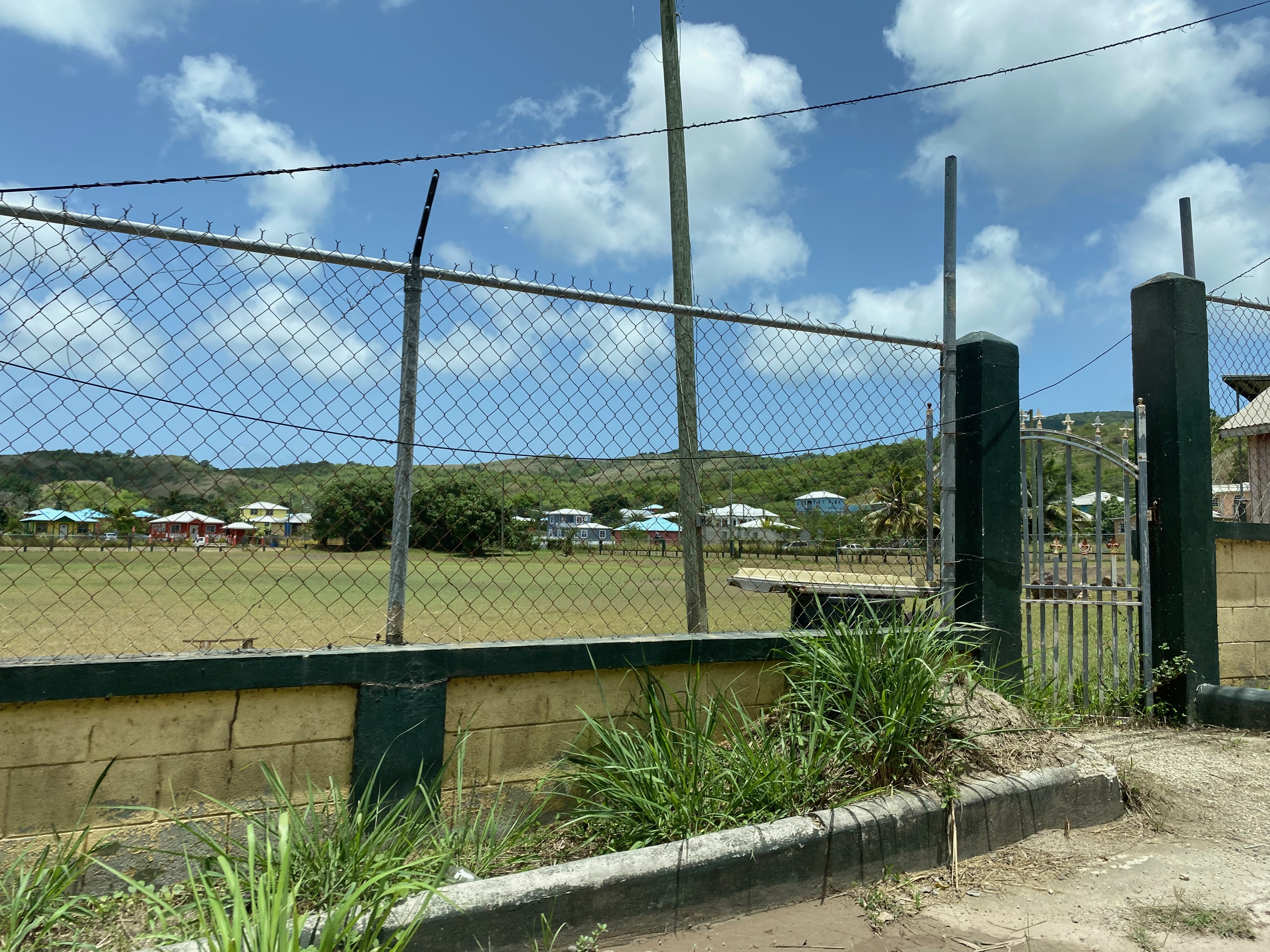
- John Hughes in June 2023
- Interactive map of the John Hughes main place
- Coordinates: 17°2′36.49″N 61°49′18.37″W
- Country: Antigua and Barbuda
- Parish: Saint Mary

Population (2011)
  - Total: 455
- Time zone: UTC-4 (AST)

John Hughes (South Antiguan: Jaan Yuuz) is a village in Saint Mary, Antigua and Barbuda. It had a population of 455 people in 2011. John Hughes is composed of two enumeration districts: Breakneck and Bishops. John Hughes is located in the Shekerley Mountains on Fig Tree Drive, between Swetes and Old Road. The village was home to various sugar estates including Sawcolts– the name of a present day area in the community. John Hughes may have been named after a retired naval pensioner from Saint Kitts that moved to the island in 1821.

The village contains the Charlesworth T. Samuel Primary School, the head office of the Wallings Nature Reserve, various inns and hotels, a community cricket ground, and some churches including Anglican and Seventh-Day Adventist churches. A 2007 report noted that the village had poor roads and public services and that more attention was needed to preserve the portion of the Leeward Islands moist forests in the village. Low-income earners in the village are also struggling with the highest cost of utilities in the area. The village is considered rural and remains one of the most deprived communities on the island. As one of the most elevated communities on the island, temperatures in John Hughes regularly plunge to around 15 °C (59 °F) during some January nights, ranking it as one of the coldest locations in the country, usually exceeded only by Freetown.

== History ==
The village was mentioned in the 1856 census as having a population of 128 in 33 homes. Some people immigrated to the area starting in 1890 to work on the construction of Wallings Dam. A map from 1957 shows a starch factory in Traumentania, between the dam and Old Road. Around the 1960s a primary school opened in the village. In 1970 the village had 751 people in 131 households. In 1991 the village had just 298 inhabitants, and in 2001 it had 423 inhabitants.

== Demographics ==
There were 455 people living in John Hughes as of the 2011 census. The village was 94.43% African, 2.78% white, 1.39% other mixed, 0.70% mixed black/white, 0.46% other, and 0.23% Hispanic. The population was born in different countries, including Antigua and Barbuda (82.13%), Guyana (3.48%), and the United States (3.48%). The population had diverse religious affiliations, including Methodists (23.95%), Adventists (21.16%), Anglicans (13.49%), Catholics (8.37%), and irreligious people (6.28%).
