= All Saints Road (Antigua) =

Highway in Antigua

Coordinates: 17°5′30.72″N 61°49′2.68″W

Road 1
- All Saints Road

Route information
- Length: 8.5 km (5.3 mi)

Major junctions
- From: Market Street in St. John's
- To: Jonas Road in All Saints

Location
- Country: Antigua and Barbuda

Highway system
- Roads in Antigua and Barbuda

All Saints Road is a highway (Note: Officially designated as such by the government.) in Antigua. As the main road of the Central Plain region, a large portion of the country's population lives close to it, with many of the country's settlements being based around it. All Saints Road begins at Market Street in St. John's and continues southwest to the junction with Buckleys Main Road at 4.2 kilometres. At 6.2 kilometres there is a junction with Sea View Farm Main Road and Freemans Village Main Road. The route ends at the junction with Jonas Road, Matthews Road and Osbourn Main Road in All Saints. The road passes through many of the island's settlements, including Potters Village and Clarkes Hill. The road is entirely in the parish of Saint John. Officially designated as a highway, All Saints Road is one of the busiest in the country. The road has more accidents than any other road in the country. In late 2025 active construction on the highway commenced, one of the largest roadworks projects in the history of the country.

== Junctions ==
The entire route is in Saint John Parish.

Location	km	mi	Destinations	Notes
St. John's	0.0	0.0	Market Street	
St. John's	0.45	0.28	Joseph Lane	
St. John's	0.8	0.50	Independence Drive	
St. John's	1.6	0.99	American Road and Bendals Road	
Potters Village	4.2	2.6	Buckleys Main Road	
Potters Village	4.7	2.9	Herberts Road	
Potters Village	6.2	3.9	Sea View Farm Main Road and Freemans Village Main Road	
All Saints	8.5	5.3	Jonas Road	
1.000 mi = 1.609 km; 1.000 km = 0.621 mi
