= National Bureau of Statistics (Antigua and Barbuda) =

Government statistical agency of Antigua and Barbuda

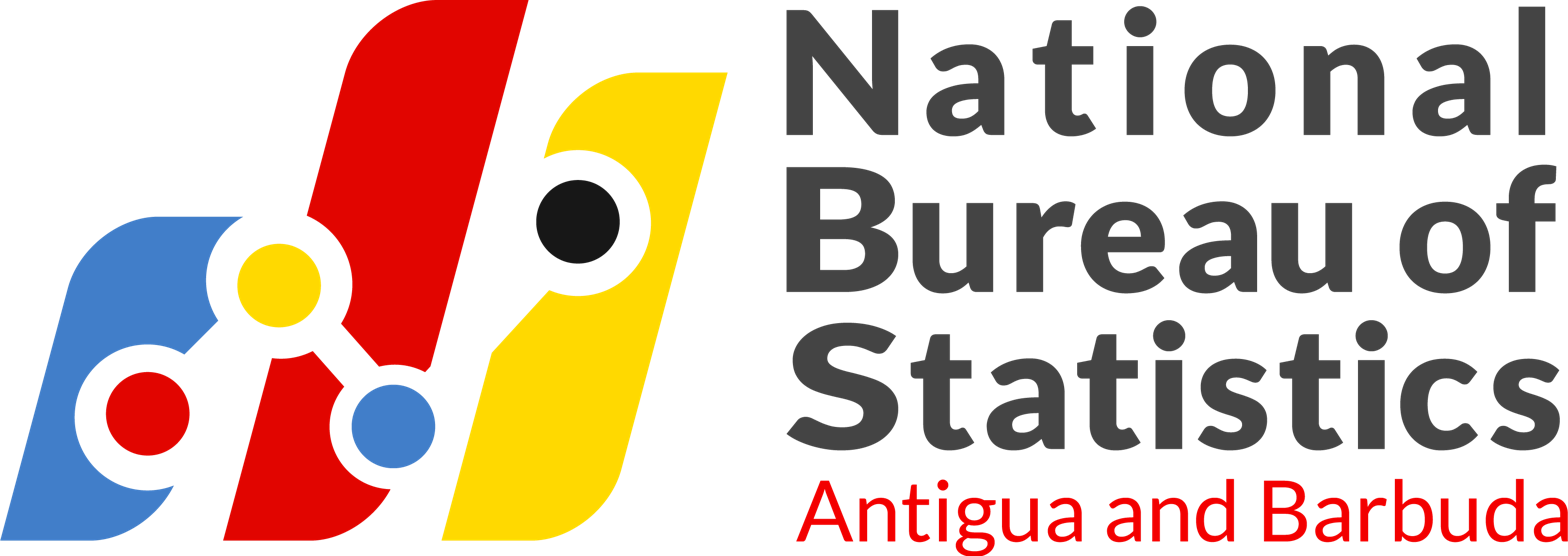

Agency overview
- Formed: 25 March 2025
- Preceding agency: Statistics Division
- Jurisdiction: Government of Antigua and Barbuda
- Annual budget: $1,576,078 XCD (2025) ▼
- Website: https://statistics.gov.ag/

The National Bureau of Statistics is the national statistical agency of Antigua and Barbuda, opened in 2025 to replace the Statistics Division. The bureau was established de jure in 2013, although the legislation was not enforced. It is an independent part of the government of Antigua and Barbuda.

== History ==
The first incarnation of the National Bureau of Statistics was the Antigua and Barbuda Statistics Division, part of the Ministry of Finance, Corporate Governance and Public Private Partnerships. In October 2013, Louise Lake-Tack signed the National Bureau of Statistics Act, 2013 which repealed the General Statistics Act and provided for a statistical board and a Director-General. This law was never enforced and the Statistics Division continued to oversee the country's statistical system until 2025. In August 2024, Rodney Williams signed a law amending the 2013 act, creating a body known as the National Statistical System, which the bureau was intended to be a part of. The principles of official statistics designated by the United Nations General Assembly was also inserted into the law. On 25 March 2025, the bureau was officially launched along with the 2025 census.

== Organisation ==
Before the National Bureau of Statistics was opened, the agency's activities were distributed to the following areas:

- Economic and Business Statistics Section
- Social and Demographic Statistics Section
- Information Services and Technology Section
- Administrative and General Services Section
