= Falmouth, Antigua and Barbuda =

Falmouth
- Town
- Town of Falmouth
- Falmouth Marina

- Location in Antigua

- Location within Antigua Location within Antigua and Barbuda Location within the Caribbean Location within North America
- Coordinates: 17°01′N 61°47′W
- Country: Antigua and Barbuda
- Island: Antigua
- Civil parish: Saint Paul

Population (2012)
  - Total: 619
- Time zone: UTC-4

Falmouth (/fɑːlməθ/; North Antiguan: Faamat [fäːmət]) is a coastal port town located in Saint Paul Parish on the island of Antigua, in Antigua and Barbuda. The town is located in the south of the island, at the end of Falmouth Harbour. Founded in the early 18th century by the British, it served as a key naval and sugar-export hub. The harbour forms part of the Nelson’s Dockyard UNESCO World Heritage Site. It is part of the broader English Harbour district, surrounded by hills and thrives as a tourism centre, with restaurants, inns, and beaches.

== History ==
Founded by the British in the early 17th century, Falmouth was the first British settlement in Antigua. Various plantation estates including sugar mills were established in the 18th century. St Paul's Church was constructed in 1676 and Fort Berkeley was opened in 1704.

== Geography ==
Falmouth is situated in the Saint Paul Parish on the southern coast of Antigua. Falmouth is located in a horseshoe shaped bay, with the Fort Berkeley located at the confluence of Falmouth and English Harbours. It experiences a warm tropical climate.

== Demographics ==
As of 2012, Falmouth had a population of 619 inhabitants. In 2018, a proposal was made for squatters who had lived on their land for ten years or more to buy their plots for $1 per 1 sq ft (0.093 m^{2}). Tourism and yachting dominate the economy with other sea-based services, restaurants, and heritage tourism driving local economy. The nearby Nelson's Dockyard is a UNESCO World Heritage Site.
