= Potters Village =

- Village
- Potters in 2023
- Interactive map of the Potters Village main place
- Location within Antigua
- Coordinates: 17°6′45.32″N 61°49′8.00″W
- Country: Antigua and Barbuda
- Island: Antigua
- Parish: Saint John
- Elevation: 15 m (49 ft)

Population (2011)
  - Total: 1,116
- Time zone: UTC-4

Potters Village is a village located on Antigua in Antigua and Barbuda. It is located in the north of the island, to the east of the capital, St. John's and southwest of Piggotts.

The town has a Living Condition Index (unmet basic needs index) of 12.60 and an unemployment rate of 16.1.

== Demographics ==
Potters Village has five enumeration districts.

- 32800 Potters-North
- 32900 Potters-Central
- 33000 Potters-East
- 33100 Potters-South
- 33200 Potters-Cemetery

=== Census data ===
Ethnic
Q48 Ethnic	Counts	%
African descendent	1,034	92.58%
East Indian/India	4	0.40%
Mixed (Black/White)	13	1.19%
Mixed (Other)	24	2.18%
Hispanic	15	1.38%
Syrian/Lebanese	7	0.59%
Other	14	1.29%
Don't know/Not stated	4	0.40%
Total	1,116	100.00%

Religion
Q49 Religion	Counts	%
Adventist	176	15.88%
Anglican	135	12.19%
Baptist	18	1.60%
Church of God	42	3.80%
Evangelical	51	4.60%
Jehovah Witness	10	0.90%
Methodist	22	2.00%
Moravian	150	13.59%
Nazarene	22	2.00%
None/no religion	81	7.29%
Pentecostal	177	15.98%
Rastafarian	4	0.40%
Roman Catholic	99	8.99%
Weslyan Holiness	54	4.90%
Other	53	4.80%
Don't know/Not stated	12	1.10%
Total	1,105	100.00%
NotApp :	11	

Country of Citizenship
Q71 Country of Citizenship 1	Counts	%
Antigua and Barbuda	922	82.59%
Other Caribbean countries	3	0.30%
Other Asian and Middle Eastern countries	3	0.30%
Dominica	32	2.87%
Dominican Republic	13	1.19%
Guyana	67	6.03%
Jamaica	25	2.27%
Monsterrat	3	0.30%
St. Lucia	10	0.89%
St. Vincent and the Grenadines	11	0.99%
Trinidad and Tobago	2	0.20%
USA	11	0.99%
Other countries	2	0.20%
Not Stated	10	0.89%
Total	1,116	100.00%

Country of Second Citizenship
Q71 Country of Citizenship 2 (Country of Second/Dual Citizenship)	Counts	%
Other Caribbean countries	13	8.89%
Canada	2	1.48%
Other Asian and Middle Eastern countries	2	1.48%
Dominica	42	28.15%
Guyana	20	13.33%
Jamaica	20	13.33%
Monsterrat	7	4.44%
St. Lucia	6	3.70%
St. Vincent and the Grenadines	14	9.63%
Trinidad and Tobago	2	1.48%
United Kingdom	4	2.96%
USA	14	9.63%
Other countries	2	1.48%
Total	149	100.00%
NotApp :	967	

Country of birth
Q58. Country of birth	Counts	%
Africa	2	0.20%
Other Latin or North American countries	3	0.30%
Antigua and Barbuda	781	69.93%
Other Caribbean countries	6	0.49%
Other Asian countries	2	0.20%
Dominica	72	6.43%
Dominican Republic	13	1.19%
Guyana	94	8.41%
Jamaica	45	4.06%
Monsterrat	9	0.79%
St. Kitts and Nevis	1	0.10%
St. Lucia	17	1.48%
St. Vincent and the Grenadines	25	2.27%
Syria	6	0.49%
Trinidad and Tobago	3	0.30%
United Kingdom	1	0.10%
USA	19	1.68%
USVI United States Virgin Islands	4	0.40%
Not Stated	13	1.19%
Total	1,116	100.00%
