= List of populated places in Antigua and Barbuda =

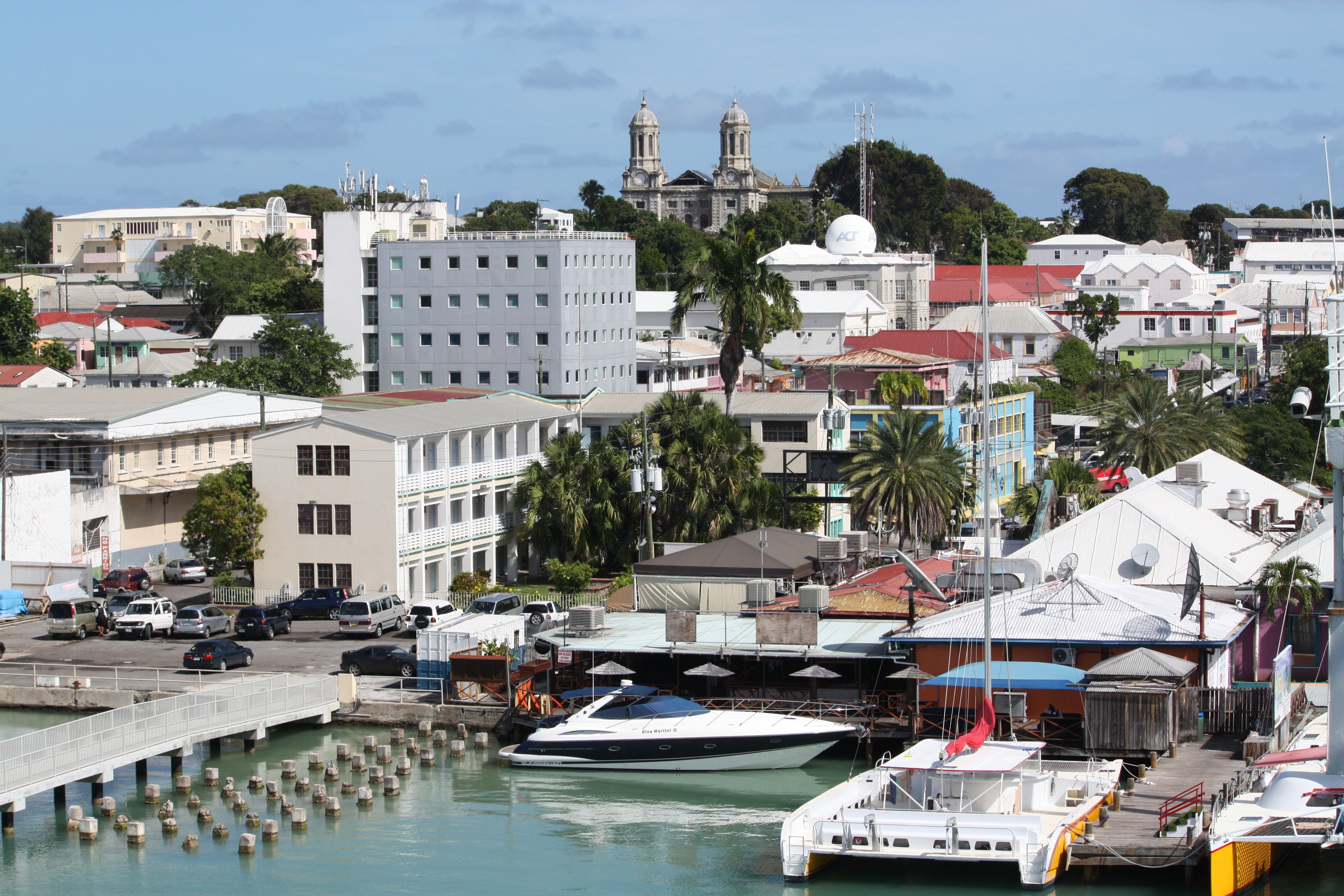
St. John's is the largest city in Antigua and Barbuda

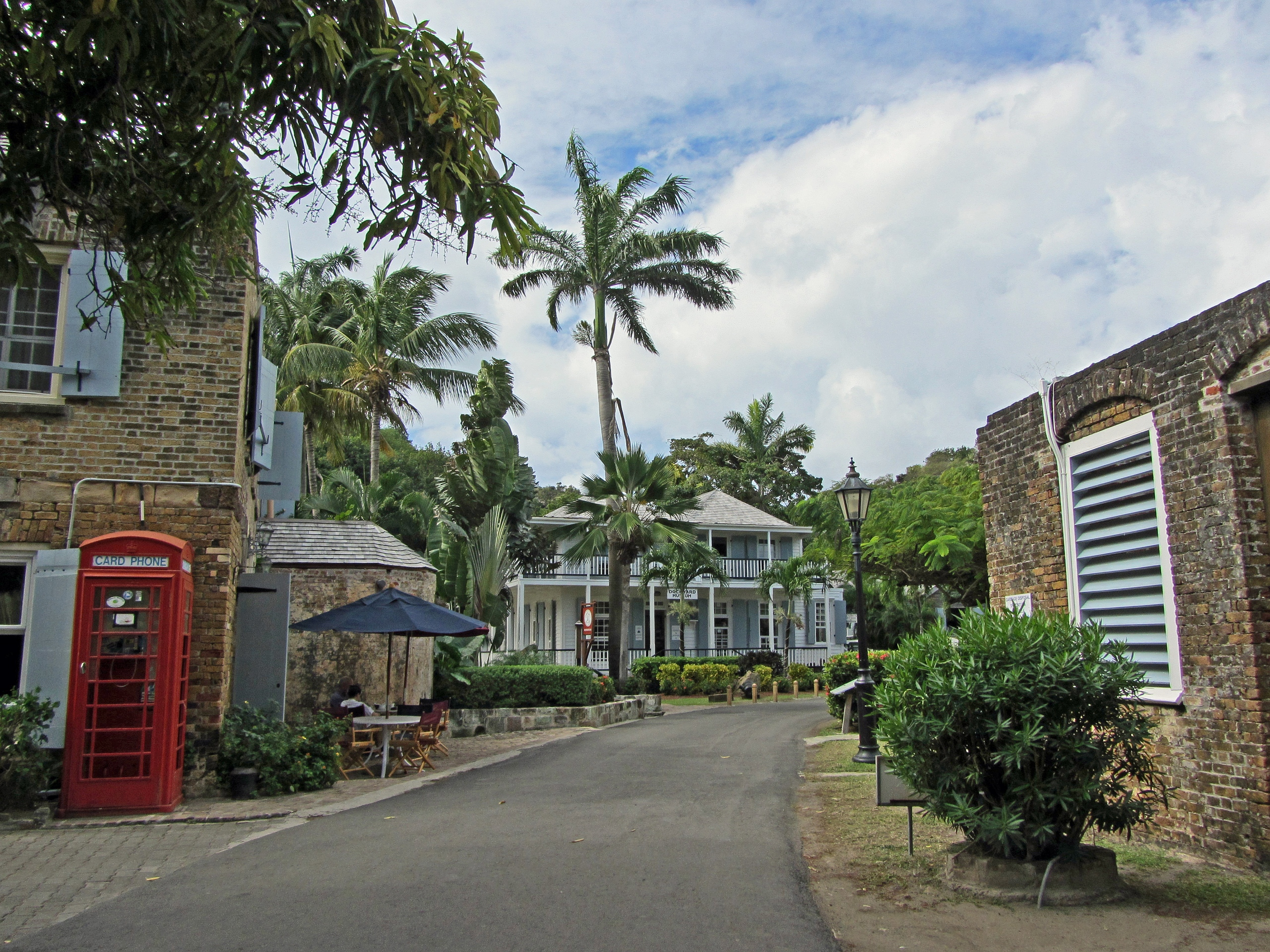
A street in English Harbour, often considered to be the country's second most important place

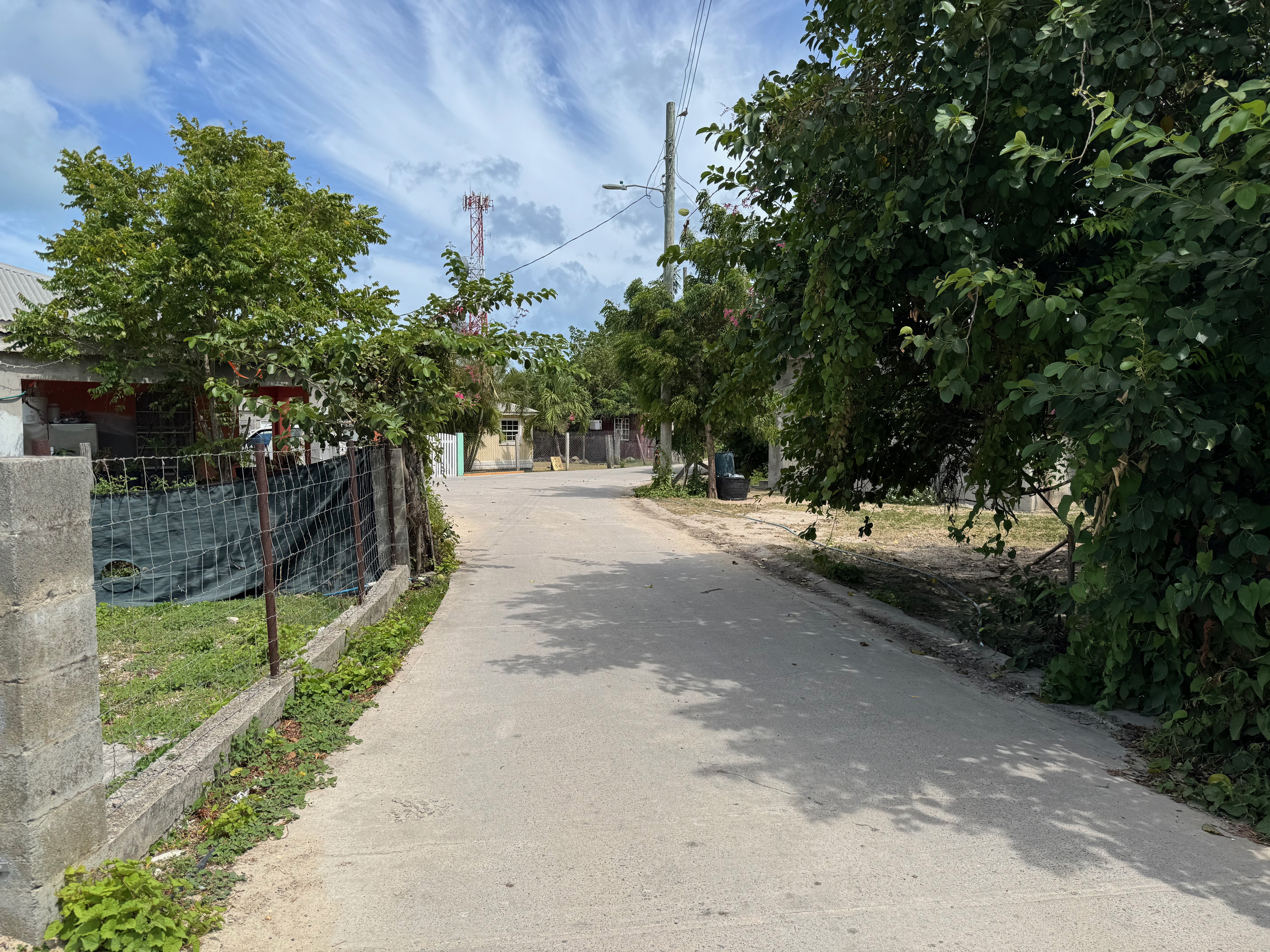
A street in Codrington, the northernmost settlement in the country and the main village on Barbuda

Main place boundaries as of the 2011 census

This is a list of settlements recognised by the National Bureau of Statistics in Antigua and Barbuda. The population counts on this list are solely based on populations within the community's official boundaries rather than including suburbs and other satellite communities.

Parish capital
Parish's largest city
Parish's largest city and capital

Name	Type	Population (2011)	Parish
Adelin	Village	331	Saint John
All Saints	Village	3,812	Saint John; Saint Paul; Saint Peter
Barbuda-East	Village	306	Barbuda
Barbuda-North	Village	296	Barbuda
Barbuda-South	Village	227	Barbuda
Barnes Hill	Village	537	Saint George
Bathlodge	Village	314	Saint John
Bellevue Heights	Village	453	Saint John
Belmont	Village	677	Saint John
Bendals	Village	671	Saint John
Bethesda	Village	499	Saint Paul
Blackman's Estate	Village	0	Saint George
Blue Waters	Village	235	Saint John
Bolans	Village	2,053	Saint Mary
Boggy Peak	Village	317	Saint Mary
Branns Hamlet	Village	689	Saint John
Buckleys	Village	801	Saint John
Carlisle	Village	545	Saint George
Cedar Grove	Village	934	Saint John
Cedar Valley	Village	616	Saint John
Christian Hill	Village	171	Saint Paul
Clare Hall	Village	1,459	Saint John
Clarkes Hill	Village	401	Saint John
Cobbs Cross	Village	282	Saint Paul
Codrington	Village	796	Barbuda
Coolidge	Village	267	Saint George
Crabbs Hill	Village	142	Saint Mary
Creekside	Village	487	Saint Mary
Crosbies	Village	788	Saint John
Diamonds	Village	57	Saint Peter
Dieppe Bay	Village	64	Saint Paul
Dow Hill	Village	174	Saint Paul
Ebenezer	Village	398	Saint Mary
Emanuel	Village	398	Saint John
English Harbour	Town	570	Saint Paul
Falmouth	Town	619	Saint Paul
Fitches Creek	Village	532	Saint George
Five Islands	Village	337	Saint John
Freemans	Village	860	Saint Peter
Freetown	Village	609	Saint Philip
Glanvilles	Village	445	Saint Philip
Grays Hill	Village	542	Saint John
Green Castle	Village	243	Saint John
Green Hill	Village	410	Saint John
Greenbay	Village	684	Saint John
Guiana Island	Village	0	Saint Peter
Gunthorpes	Village	432	Saint John
Hatton Hill	Village	234	Saint John
Herberts	Village	741	Saint John
Hodges Bay	Village	900	Saint John
Jacks Hill	Village	1,151	Saint John
Jennings	Village	1,481	Saint Mary
John Hughes	Village	455	Saint Mary
Johnsons Point	Village	204	Saint Mary
Liberta	Village	2,003	Saint Paul
Long Bay	Village	25	Saint Philip
Long Island	Village	3	Saint Peter
Long Lane–Collins	Village	118	Saint Philip
Maiden Island	Village	0	Saint Peter
Marble Hill	Village	271	Saint John
Marsh Village	Village	304	Saint Paul
McKinnon's	Village	1,247	Saint John
Mill Reef–Half Moon Bay	Village	13	Saint Philip
Montpelier–Brownes Bay–Gaynors	Village	0	Saint Philip
New Winthropes	Village	1,266	Saint George
Newfield	Village	255	Saint Philip
Old Road	Town	1,251	Saint Mary
Osbourn	Village	35	Saint George
Paradise View	Village	200	Saint John
Pares	Village	575	Saint Peter
Parham	Town	1,307	Saint Peter
Pattersons	Village	417	Saint Paul
Piggotts	Village	1,561	Saint George
Piggotts Ville	Village	370	Saint John
Potters Village	Village	1,116	Saint John
Prison Farm	Village	566	Saint John
Renfrew	Village	370	Saint George
Scotts Hill	Village	436	Saint John
Sea View Farm	Village	792	Saint George
Seatons	Village	457	Saint Philip
Skerretts	Village	481	Saint John
Skyline	Village	1,212	Saint John
St. Claire	Village	898	Saint John
St. John's	City	22,219	Saint John
St. Johnston	Village	515	Saint John
St. Philip's	Town	131	Saint Philip
Sugar Factory	Village	1,051	Saint George
Swetes	Village	1,720	Saint Paul
Table Hill Gardens	Village	191	Saint Paul
Tomlinson	Village	808	Saint John
Trade Winds	Village	120	Saint John
Tyrells	Village	396	Saint Paul
Upper Gamble's	Village	366	Saint John
Upper Lightfoot	Village	545	Saint George
Urlings	Village	738	Saint Mary
Vernons	Village	564	Saint Peter
Willikies	Village	1,270	Saint Philip
Yeptons	Village	314	Saint John

== See more ==
- List of populated places in the Caribbean
