= Rendezvous Bay Division =

Division of Antigua

Rendezvous Bay
- Division
- Coordinates: 17°01′02.2″N 61°48′28.7″W
- Country: Antigua and Barbuda
- Parish: Saint Paul

Rendezvous Bay is a division of Saint Paul, Antigua and Barbuda. It is named after Rendezvous Bay. One of the smallest and most sparsely populated divisions, important locations other than Rendezvous Bay include Ding-a-Dong-Nook and Barter's.
