= Dickenson Bay Division =

Division of Antigua

Dickenson Bay
- Division
- Coordinates: 17°08′42″N 61°51′26″W
- Country: Antigua and Barbuda
- Parish: Saint John

Dickenson Bay is a division of Saint John, Antigua and Barbuda. It is composed of towns such as Trade Winds, McKinnon's, and Blue Waters, some of the most premier resort areas on the island's north coast. McKinnon's Pond is the largest body of water in the area and several ghauts flow into it. It is just north of the city of St. John's.
