= Winthropes =

- Former village
- Location within Antigua
- Coordinates: 17°08′22.67″N 61°47′21.42″W
- Country: Antigua and Barbuda
- Parish: Saint George

Population (1856)
  - Total: 309

Winthropes was a village in Saint George, Antigua and Barbuda. Winthropes developed around a sugar plantation established in 1638 and was named after Samuel Winthrop, the eldest son of John Winthrop, a former Massachusetts governor. In 1678, this plantation had a population of 6 whites and 67 blacks. In 1856, Winthropes had a population of 309 people in 71 homes.

In the 1940s, the United States decided to build an airbase here (now the V. C. Bird International Airport). The people of the village, except for a white family known as the MacDonalds, were forced to leave. While there was initially some tension between the Americans and the village elders, the United States promised to build a "model village" in another part of the island. During the negotiations, the United States fenced their base and Winthropes residents were required to show a pass to come and leave. Bulldozers were also sent by the Americans to destroy gardens and encourage their departure. Eventually, an American-funded village, New Winthropes, was established near Barnes Hill on 2 April 1942.
