= Divisions of Antigua =

Divisions
- Location: Antigua and Barbuda
- Number: 15
- Subdivisions: Districts (former)

The parishes of Antigua are divided de jure into 15 divisions, which function as the second-level administrative divisions of the country along with the districts of Barbuda. While the divisions of Antigua no longer have local government functions, they continue to be recognised under the Parish Boundaries Act. The divisions existed before the parishes and were eventually grouped together in the late seventeenth century to form them. One division became a parish in and of itself: Saint George (New North Sound Division), established in 1725. Some divisions had a justice of the peace, waywardens, constables, and residents of the divisions were known to petition to the colonial legislature to improve local utilities. Prior to emancipation, the movement of slaves between divisions was heavily controlled.

Divisions were formerly subdivided into districts. Before the establishment of the modern Antiguan electoral system following World War II, these divisions were also the basis of the constituencies in the legislative council. Areas with town and city status often were administratively separate from the towns in practice.

== List ==
Division	Parish
Popeshead Division	Saint John
Dickenson Bay Division	Saint John
New North Sound Division	Saint George
Old North Sound Division	Saint Peter
Belfast Division	Saint Philip
Nonsuch Division	Saint Philip
Falmouth Division	Saint Paul
Old Road Division	Saint Mary
Bermudian Valley Division	Saint Mary
New Division	Saint Mary
St. John's Division	Saint John
Five Islands Division	Saint John
Rendezvous Bay Division	Saint Paul
Willoughby Bay Division	Saint Philip, Saint Paul
Mercers Creek Division	Saint Peter
