= British West Indies =

British territories in the Caribbean, sometimes including former colonies

Coordinates: 24.0000°N 71.0000°W

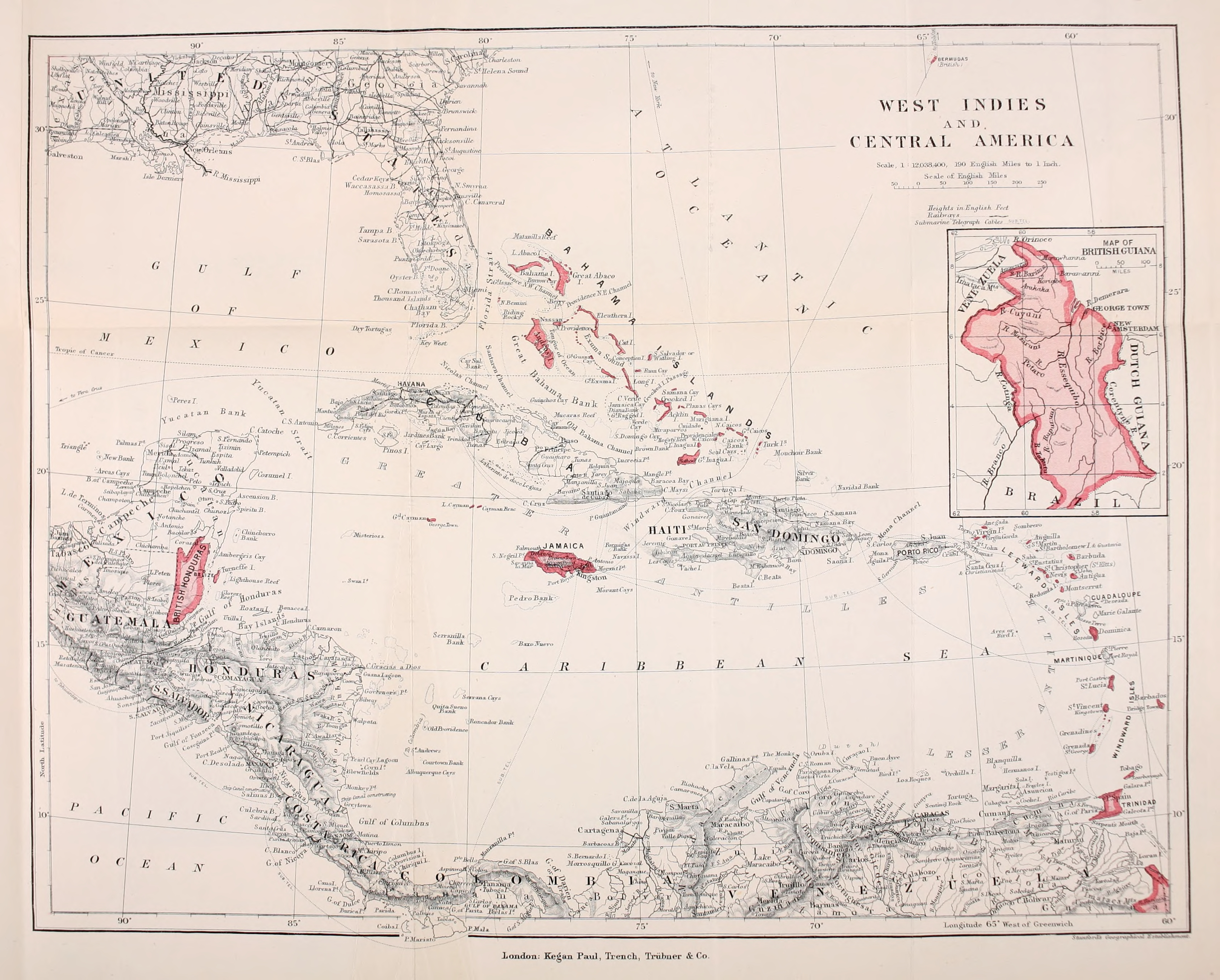
British West Indies in 1900

BWI in red and pink (blue islands are other territories with English as an official language)

The British West Indies (BWI) were the territories in the West Indies under British rule, including Anguilla, the Cayman Islands, the Turks and Caicos Islands, Montserrat, the British Virgin Islands, Bermuda, Antigua and Barbuda, the Bahamas, Barbados, Dominica, Grenada, Jamaica, Saint Kitts and Nevis, Saint Lucia, Saint Vincent and the Grenadines, British Honduras, British Guiana and Trinidad and Tobago.

The Kingdom of England first established colonies in the region during the 17th century. Financed by valuable extractive commodities such as sugar production, the colonies were also at the centre of the Atlantic slave trade, with around 2.3 million slaves being brought to the British West Indies. The colonies also served as bases to project the power of the British Empire through the Royal Navy and Britain's Merchant Marine, and to expand and protect British overseas trade. Before the decolonization of the Americas in the later 1950s and 1960s, the term "British West Indies" was regularly used to include all British colonies in the region as part of the British Empire. Following the independence of most of the territories from the United Kingdom, the term Commonwealth Caribbean is now used.

In 1912, the British government divided their territories into different colonies: The Bahamas, Barbados, British Guiana, British Honduras, Jamaica (with its dependencies the Turks and Caicos Islands and the Cayman Islands), Trinidad and Tobago, the Windward Islands, and the Leeward Islands. Between 1958 and 1962, all of the island territories except the British Virgin Islands, the Bahamas and Bermuda were organised into the West Indies Federation. It was hoped that the Federation would become independent as a single nation, but it had limited powers and faced many practical problems. Consequently, the West Indies Federation was dissolved in 1962.

The territories are now fully independent sovereign states, except for five – Anguilla, the British Virgin Islands, the Cayman Islands, Montserrat, and the Turks and Caicos Islands – which remain British Overseas Territories, as does Bermuda. All remain within the Commonwealth of Nations. They also established the Caribbean Community, and many of the nations have joined various international bodies, such as the Organization of American States, the Association of Caribbean States, the World Trade Organization, the United Nations, and the Caribbean Development Bank among others.

== Territories ==
The territories that were part of the British West Indies are (date of independence, where applicable, in parentheses):

- The Bahamas (1973)
- Barbados (1966) / (2021)
- Belize (formerly British Honduras) (1981)
- Guatemala (formerly British Honduras) (1981)
- Honduras (formerly British Honduras) (1981)
- Bermuda (British overseas territory)
- British Leeward Islands
  - Anguilla (British overseas territory)
  - Antigua and Barbuda (1981) / (2026)
  - British Virgin Islands (British overseas territory)
  - Dominica (1978)
  - Montserrat (British overseas territory)
  - Saint Kitts and Nevis (1983)
- British Windward Islands
  - Grenada (1974)
  - Saint Lucia (1979)
  - Saint Vincent and the Grenadines (1979)
- Cayman Islands (British overseas territory)
- Guyana (formerly British Guiana) (1966) / (2026)
- Jamaica (formerly Colony of Jamaica) (1962)
- Trinidad and Tobago (1962)
- Turks and Caicos Islands (British overseas territory)

== History ==
The origins of the British West Indies lie in outposts established to support English pirates and privateers who were involved in raiding Spanish treasure fleets, and merchants interested in trade. Charles Leigh, an English merchant, established a short-lived settlement on the Wiapoco River in 1604 (now the Oyapock, which forms the border between French Guiana and Brazil). This was followed by failed attempts to established settlements in Saint Lucia in 1605 and Grenada in 1609. The first permanent settlement was established in St. Christopher (St. Kitts) by Thomas Warner. This was followed by settlements in Barbados in 1627, Nevis in 1628, and Montserrat and Antigua in 1632. Providence Island was colonised by English Puritans in 1630, but the colony was destroyed by the Spanish in 1641. The capture of Jamaica in 1655 expanded British control beyond these small islands in the Lesser Antilles.

=== Leeward Islands ===
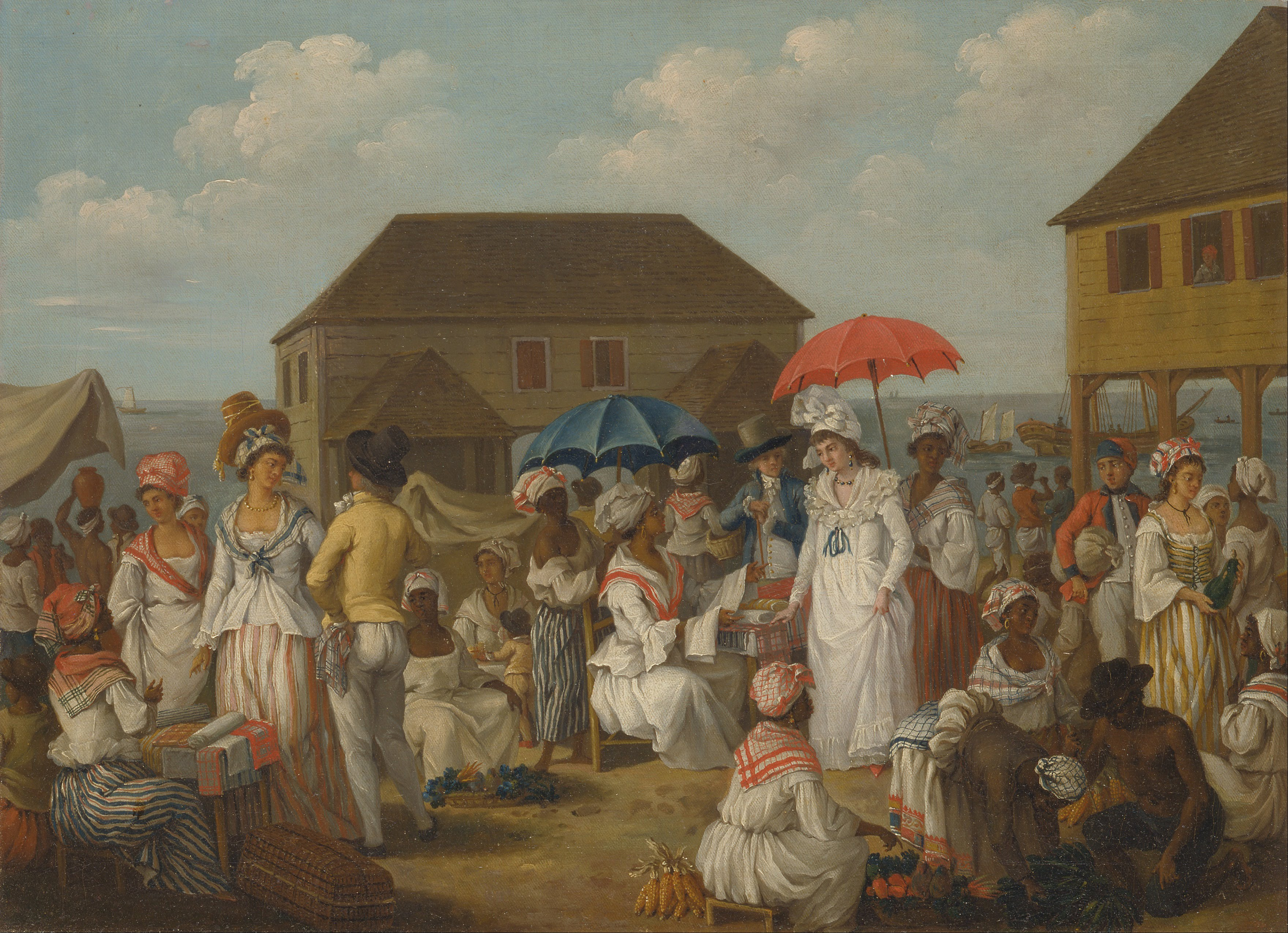
A linen market in Dominica in the 1770s

Sir William Stapleton established the first federation in the British West Indies in 1674. He set up a General Assembly of the Leeward Islands in St. Kitts. Stapleton's federation was active between 1674 and 1685, during his term as governor, and the General Assembly met regularly until 1711.

By the 18th century, each island had kept its own Assembly and made its own laws. The islands continued to share one Governor and one Attorney-General. Although unpopular, Stapleton's federation was never really dissolved but simply replaced by other arrangements.

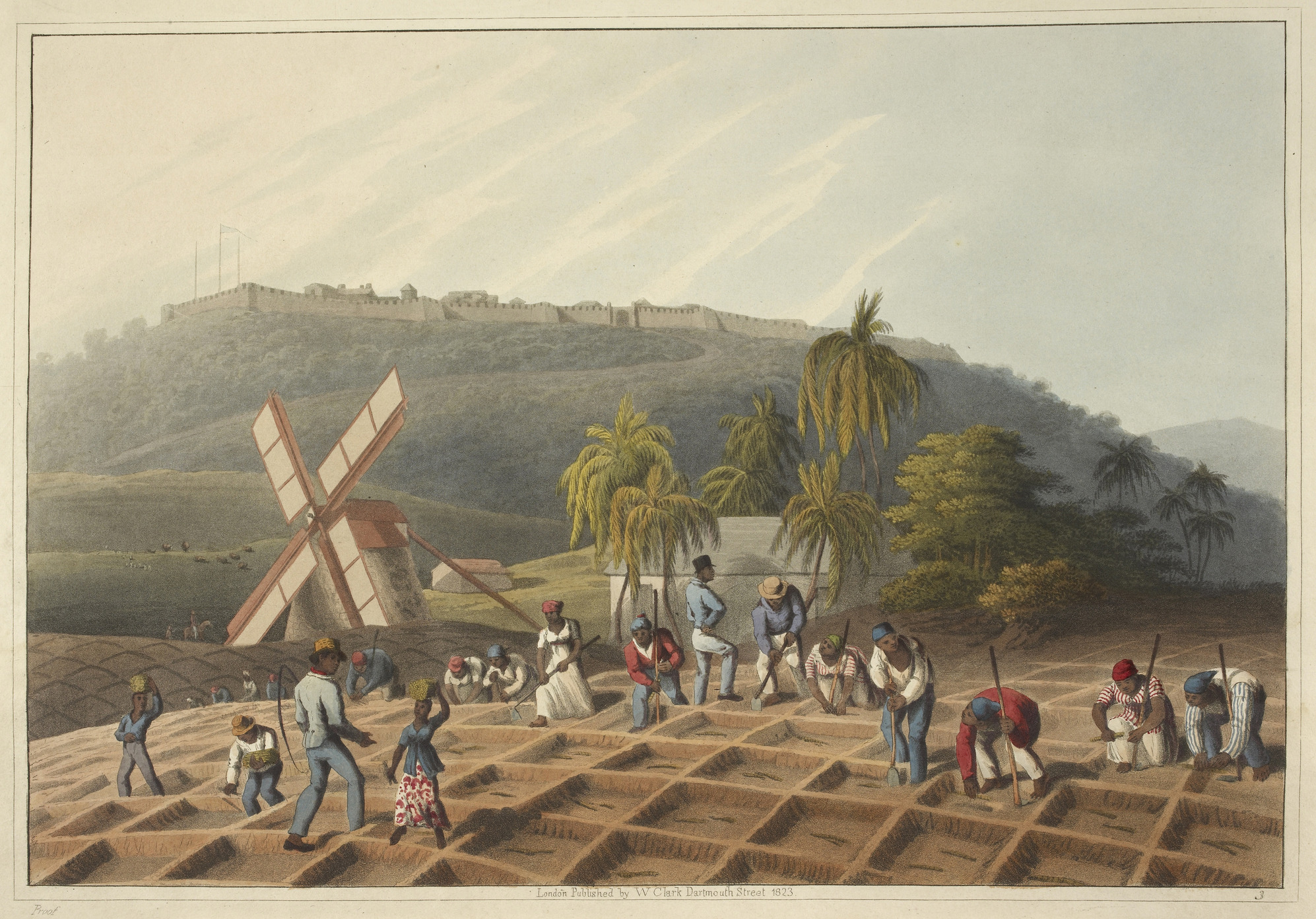
Planting the sugar cane (Bodkins, Antigua, 1823)

Between 1816 and 1833, the Leewards were divided into two groups: St. Christopher-Nevis-Anguilla and Antigua-Barbuda-Montserrat, each with its own Governor. In 1833, all the Leeward Islands were brought together, and Dominica was added, remaining as part of the group until 1940.

In 1869, Governor Benjamin Pine was assigned to organise a federation of Antigua-Barbuda, Dominica, Montserrat, Nevis, St. Kitts, Anguilla and the British Virgin Islands. St. Kitts and Nevis opposed sharing their government funds with Antigua and Montserrat, which were bankrupt. Governor Pine told the Colonial Office that the scheme had failed due to "local prejudice and self-interest". His only achievement was to give the Leewards a single Governor. All laws and ordinances had to be approved by each island council.

In 1871, the British government passed the Leeward Islands Act, by which all the islands were under one Governor and one set of laws. The Federal Colony was composed of all islands organised under Governor Pine's previous attempt. Each island was called a "Presidency" under its own Administrator or Commissioner. Like earlier groupings, this federation was unpopular but it continued until 1956, when it was redefined as the Territory of the Leeward Islands. In 1958, the Federation of the West Indies was organised, of which the Leeward Islands became a part.

=== Windward Islands ===
In 1833, the Windward Islands became a formal union called the Windward Islands Colony. In 1838, Trinidad (acquired in 1802) and St. Lucia (acquired in 1814) were brought into the Windward Islands Colony, but were not given their own assemblies (having previously been Crown Colonies). In 1840 Trinidad left the Colony. Barbados wished to retain its separate identity and ancient institutions, and the other colonies did not want to associate with it. The individual islands resisted British attempts at closer union. Barbados in particular fought to retain its own Assembly and left the union in 1884. Power for the union was then transferred to Grenada as overseer of the bloc.

From 1885 to 1958, the Windward Islands Colony included Grenada, St. Vincent and the Grenadines and St. Lucia during the entire period. Tobago left in 1889, forming a union with Trinidad. Dominica joined the Windward Islands Colony in 1940, after having been transferred from the Leewards, and remained in the Colony until 1958. After 1885 the Windward Islands Colony was under one Governor-General in Grenada, and each island had its own Lieutenant-Governor and its own assembly (as before). Attempts to create a Federal Colony, as in the Leewards, were always resisted. The Windward Islands Colony broke up in 1958 when each island chose to join the new Federation of the West Indies as a separate unit.

=== Jamaica and dependencies ===
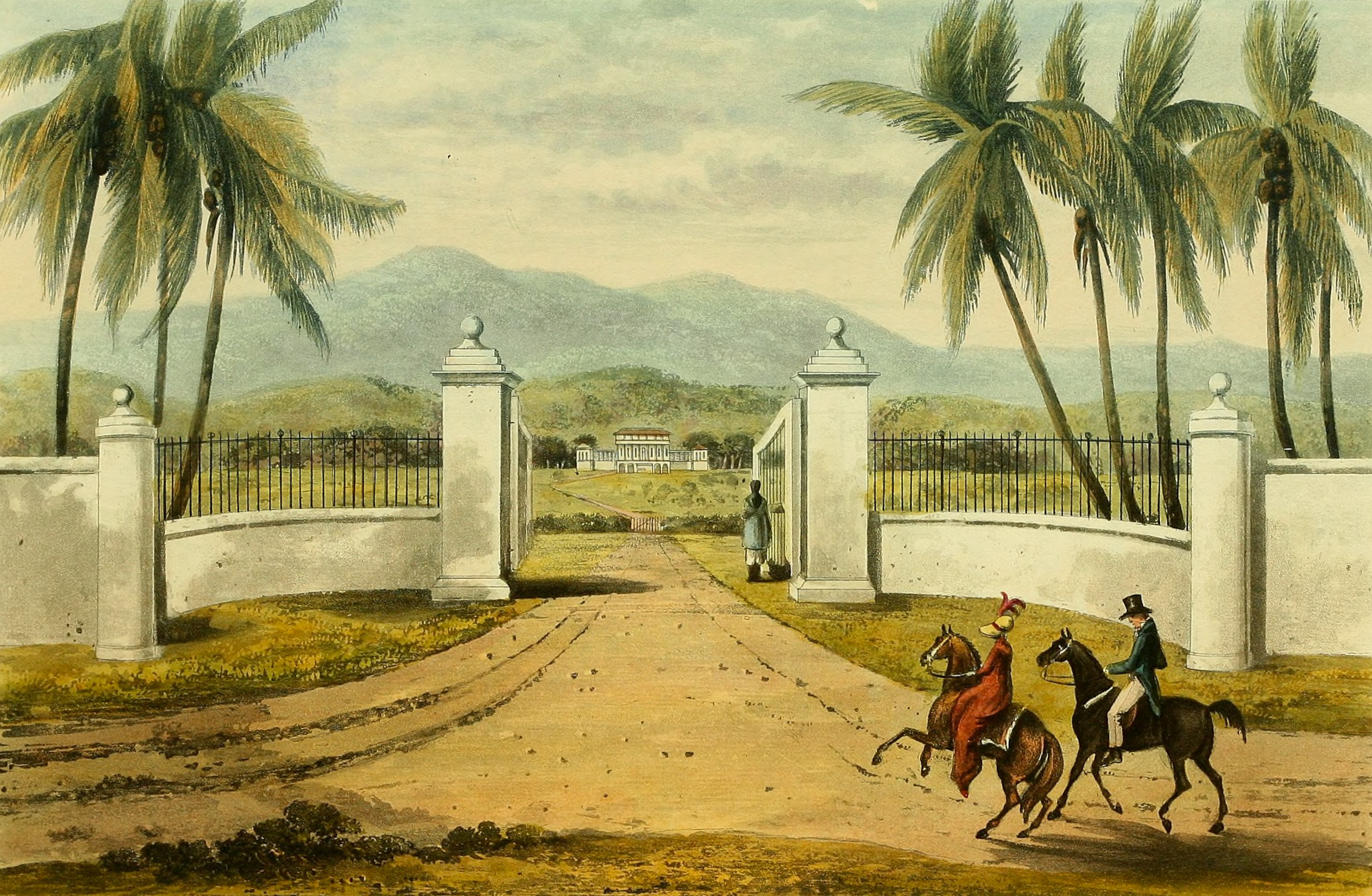
Rose Hall plantation, Jamaica c. 1820

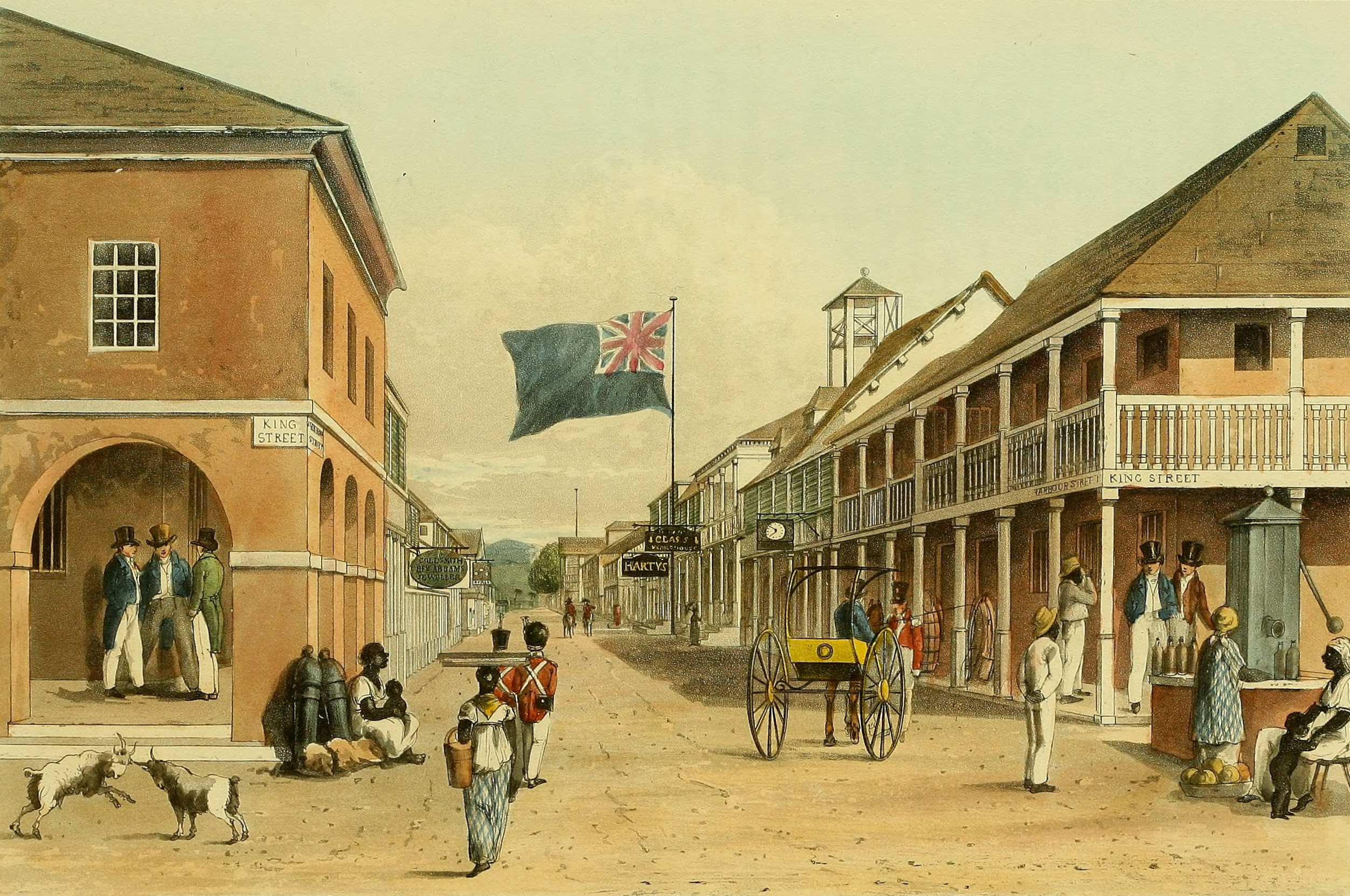
Harbour Street, Kingston, Jamaica, c. 1820

The Cayman Islands and Turks and Caicos Islands were grouped under Jamaica out of convenience and sometimes for historical and/or geographical reasons. British Honduras (later Belize) was surrounded by hostile Spanish colonies and needed the protection afforded by the Jamaican Army and Navy. In addition, British Honduras had been founded by loggers. It increased in population partly by the settlement of Englishmen migrating from Jamaica in the late 17th and early 18th centuries (settlers also immigrated directly from England; others were born in the colony.) From 1742, British Honduras was a dependency directly under the Governor of Jamaica. In 1749 the Governors of Jamaica appointed Administrators for British Honduras.

In 1862, British Honduras became a Crown Colony; it was placed under the Governor of Jamaica with its own Lieutenant-Governor. In 1884 it finally broke all administrative ties with Jamaica and wanted self governance, as did Cayman Islands and the Turks and Caicos Islands.

=== West Indies Federation ===
The West Indies Federation was a short-lived federation that existed from 3 January 1958 to 31 May 1962. It consisted of several Caribbean colonies of the United Kingdom. The Federation's purpose was to create a political unit that would become independent from Britain as a single state, similar to the Federation of Australia or Canadian Confederation. The Federation collapsed due to internal political conflicts over how it would be governed before that could develop.

=== West Indies Associated States ===
In 1967, following the termination of the West Indies Federation, a number of Eastern Caribbean islands formed a free association form of government along with the United Kingdom called the West Indies Associated States. The arrangement was created through the British House of Commons passing the West Indies Act (1967) (also known as the Associated States Act). As part of the arrangement more sovereignty was granted to the bloc of West Indies countries with the United Kingdom maintaining responsibility for defence and external affairs only.

=== Territories today ===
British Overseas Territories in the West Indies

Although most of the British West Indies seceded from British rule and were granted independence, several opted to remain British territories. Those territories include:

- Anguilla
- Bermuda (sometimes included as part of the BWI)
- British Virgin Islands
- Cayman Islands
- Montserrat
- Turks and Caicos Islands

== Sport ==
=== Cricket ===
Cricket has traditionally been the main sport in the British West Indies (though others sports such as football have challenged its dominance since the 1990s). Most of the countries and territories listed above field a combined cricket team called the West Indies, which is one of the twelve elite international teams that play at Test match level. The West Indies hosted the 2007 Cricket World Cup of ODI Cricket and the 2010 ICC World Twenty20.

== See also ==
- Commonwealth Caribbean
- British colonization of the Americas
- British North America
- BWIA West Indies Airways
- Crown Dependencies
- Foreign and Commonwealth Office
- Indo-Caribbean
- Right of abode
- University of the West Indies
- British West Indies Regiment
- West Indies (Danish – Dutch – French – Spanish)
