= Nonsuch Division =

Division of Antigua

Nonsuch
- Division
- Coordinates: 17°03′N 61°42′W
- Country: Antigua and Barbuda
- Parish: Saint Philip

Nonsuch is a division of Saint Philip, Antigua and Barbuda. It is named after Nonsuch Bay and contains the parish capital, St. Philip's, as well as Freetown and many other major locations. The most popular tourist destination in the division is Half Moon Bay beach. It borders the island's Atlantic coastline.
