= Five Islands Division =

Division of Antigua

Five Islands
- Division
- Coordinates: 17°07′08″N 61°53′00″W
- Country: Antigua and Barbuda
- Parish: Saint John

Five Islands is a division of Saint John, Antigua and Barbuda. Named after Five Islands, it makes up most of the Five Islands peninsula. It also contains the locality of Yeptons and is located to the west of St. John's city.
