= Falmouth Division =

Division of Antigua

Falmouth
- Division
- Coordinates: 17°01′N 61°47′W
- Country: Antigua and Barbuda
- Parish: Saint Paul

Falmouth is a division of Saint Paul, Antigua and Barbuda. Named after the town of Falmouth, it also contains English Harbour and much of the southern All Saints Road corridor. It is located within the Central Plain.
