= Belfast Division =

Division of Antigua

Belfast
- Division
- Coordinates: 17°05′N 61°42′W
- Country: Antigua and Barbuda
- Parish: Saint Philip

Belfast is a division of Saint Philip, Antigua and Barbuda. It makes up the northern peninsula of the parish and is named after Belfast Bay, now known as Mercers Creek Bay. The division contains much of the parish's population, including the largest village, Willikies. The Sir Robin Yearwood Highway passes through the area.
