= Old North Sound Division =

Division of Antigua

Old North Sound
- Division
- Coordinates: 17°04′46″N 61°47′07″W
- Country: Antigua and Barbuda
- Parish: Saint Peter

Old North Sound is a division of Saint Peter, Antigua and Barbuda. It comprises the bulk of the parish and contains virtually all of its population, including the parish's headtown, Parham. The western portion of the division is mostly flat while the eastern portion contains some small hills.
