= History of Antigua and Barbuda (1493–1687) =

Santa Maria de la Antigua (1493–1627) Antigua (1627–1687)
- 1493–1687
- Demonym: Antiguan
- History
  - Established: 1493
  - Disestablished: 1687
- Today part of: Antigua and Barbuda

This article covers the history of Antigua and Barbuda from the end of the Pre-Columbian period in 1493 to 1687. During this era, the first African slaves were brought to Antigua and Barbuda, and the native population was driven to near-extinction. For much of this period, Antigua and Barbuda was officially known as the Colony of Antigua or simply Antego. Barbuda, then a separate entity, was often referred to as Dulcina.

== Colonisation attempts (1493–1626) ==
Christopher Columbus made contact with Antigua in 1493. He named it Santa Maria de la Antigua after a church in Spain. Antigua was ignored by Europeans until 1520, when Don Antonio Serrano and a small party attempted to colonise it. He was granted a letters-patent by the King of Spain to take control of Antigua, Barbuda, Montserrat, and other islands in the region. They expelled the remaining indigenous population, but left shortly after, leaving the island again uncolonised until 1627.

== Arrival of the English (1627–1653) ==
In 1627, the Earl of Carlisle was granted Antigua, Barbados, and the rest of the Leeward Islands by Charles I. The Earl of Marlborough opposed this, and a compromise was later reached. The Earl of Carlisle remained the proprietor. Carlisle was mainly interested in Barbados, although he did live to see the colonisation of Antigua. The first permanent European settlement in Antigua was a small "private speculation".

Pierre Belain d'Esnambuc and a group of sailors attempted to settle Antigua in 1629, but due to a lack of water, he quickly left. While a "Mr. Williams" (father of Rowland Williams, the first white person born on the island) is a possible first English settler, the first confirmed English settlement was in 1632. This is when Sir Thomas Warner, under the instructions of Carlisle, sent his son Edward and a small party to colonise Antigua.

Colonisation continued, but in 1640, the settlers were pillaged by the Kalinago (then known as "Caribs"), who destroyed much of the island's infrastructure. It is possible that the Kalinago invaders killed the governor's wife and children, however, this is not certain. This event is remembered in modern Antiguan and Barbudan society due to the legend of Ding-a-Dong-Nook. Carib attacks continued in Falmouth, the main village (now a town) where the Government House was exposed.

== Late colonisation and permanence of the colony (1654–1687) ==
In 1654, yet another large attack was conducted by the Kalinago, but this resulted in a major victory for the settlers. The Kalinago were intimidated, and the colony was free of Kalinago attacks for the next few years. However, during this period, the colony's inhabitants were not content with the actions of the governor Christopher Reynall. In 1655, Antigua expressed interest in joining some other colonies in sending troops to assist a British expedition to Santo Domingo. However, due to the poor state of the colony at the time, Antigua decided not to participate. Antigua was against Oliver Cromwell, and during the Restoration, Charles II granted Francis Willoughby the entire island.

In 1666, the French attacked Antigua. On 2 November, a French crew set sail from Guadeloupe and after a failed attempt to enter St. John's Harbour, they entered Five Island Harbour which was defended by two forts. The smaller fort was staffed by a small group which fired at them, but the French fired back, resulting in the English fleeing. The French then anchored, where a party landed and captured the forts. Then at 4:00 am the next morning, 200 men landed on the beach and while they faced much opposition, the French outnumbered and overpowered them, and the governor was later captured. On 4 November, they decided to take control of the remainder of the island, and the 240-man invasion force divided into two companies. The French were victorious, but the remaining English were allowed to keep their property and religion. The island was later returned under the Treaty of Breda. By this point, Codrington became the main village in Barbuda.

On 13 April 1668 [O.S.], the Legislature of Antigua met for the first time. The British Leeward Islands were later established in 1671, and the remainder of this period was focused on recovering from the French occupation and exterminating the remaining Kalinago in the Caribbean. On 9 January 1685, Christopher and John Codrington were granted a fifty-year lease of Barbuda.
