= Popeshead Division =

Division of Antigua

- Division
- Coordinates: 17°9′56″N 61°48′30″W
- Country: Antigua and Barbuda
- Parish: Saint John

Popeshead is a division of Saint John, Antigua and Barbuda. It is located on the northern part of the island and has one major highway, Cedar Grove Main Road. It is relatively hilly, especially in the south. It borders the Caribbean Sea between Antigua and Barbuda to the north.
