= Barnes Hill Community Reservoir =

Park in Saint George, Antigua and Barbuda

- Interactive map of Barnes Hill Community Reservoir
- Location: Barnes Hill, Saint George, Antigua and Barbuda
- Coordinates: 17°8′36.66″N 61°48′26.01″W
- Area: 2.4 acres

The Barnes Hill Community Reservoir is a nature park and former reservoir in Barnes Hill, Saint George, Antigua and Barbuda. It covers an area of 2.4 acres.

The original reservoir was built following a colonial community risk assessment in 1893. During the existence of the reservoir, it was often dry with poor maintenance. Every day, residents of the village would line up at the reservoir for their daily allocation of water.

After a series of hurricanes in the 1950s, the ghaut feeding the reservoir was polluted and the reservoir's roof was damaged. It was eventually left abandoned and what was left of the reservoir became overgrown with bush and large trees. The community came to struggle with its water resources, a contributing factor to the establishment of the Barnes Hill Community Development Organization (BHCDO) in 2015, which advocates for the restoration of this infrastructure. In 2016 the organization received a $50,000 grant from the Caribbean Natural Resources Institute to help restore the reservoir.

Today, community events are often held at the park and the Shoul family donated 1.6 acres to BHCDO to construct an additional reservoir.
