= Burke's Estate =

Official historic site of Antigua and Barbuda

Burke's
- Location within Antigua and Barbuda
- 17°03′34.2″N 61°46′54.0″W
- Location: Saint Paul, Antigua and Barbuda

History
- Built: 1675

Historical Site of Antigua and Barbuda

Burke's is an official historic site in Saint Paul, Antigua and Barbuda. It was a sugar plantation established in 1675. The sugar mill tower continues to stand. 153 people were enslaved here at the time of emancipation.
