= Thomas's Estate =

Official historic site of Antigua and Barbuda

Thomas's
- Location within Antigua and Barbuda
- 17°02′38.2″N 61°44′54.6″W
- Location: Saint Paul, Antigua and Barbuda

History
- Built: 1667

Historical Site of Antigua and Barbuda

Thomas's is an official historic site in Saint Paul, Antigua and Barbuda. It was a sugar plantation established in 1667. The sugar mill tower continues to stand. 90 people were enslaved here at the time of emancipation.
