= Delaps =

Official historic site of Antigua and Barbuda

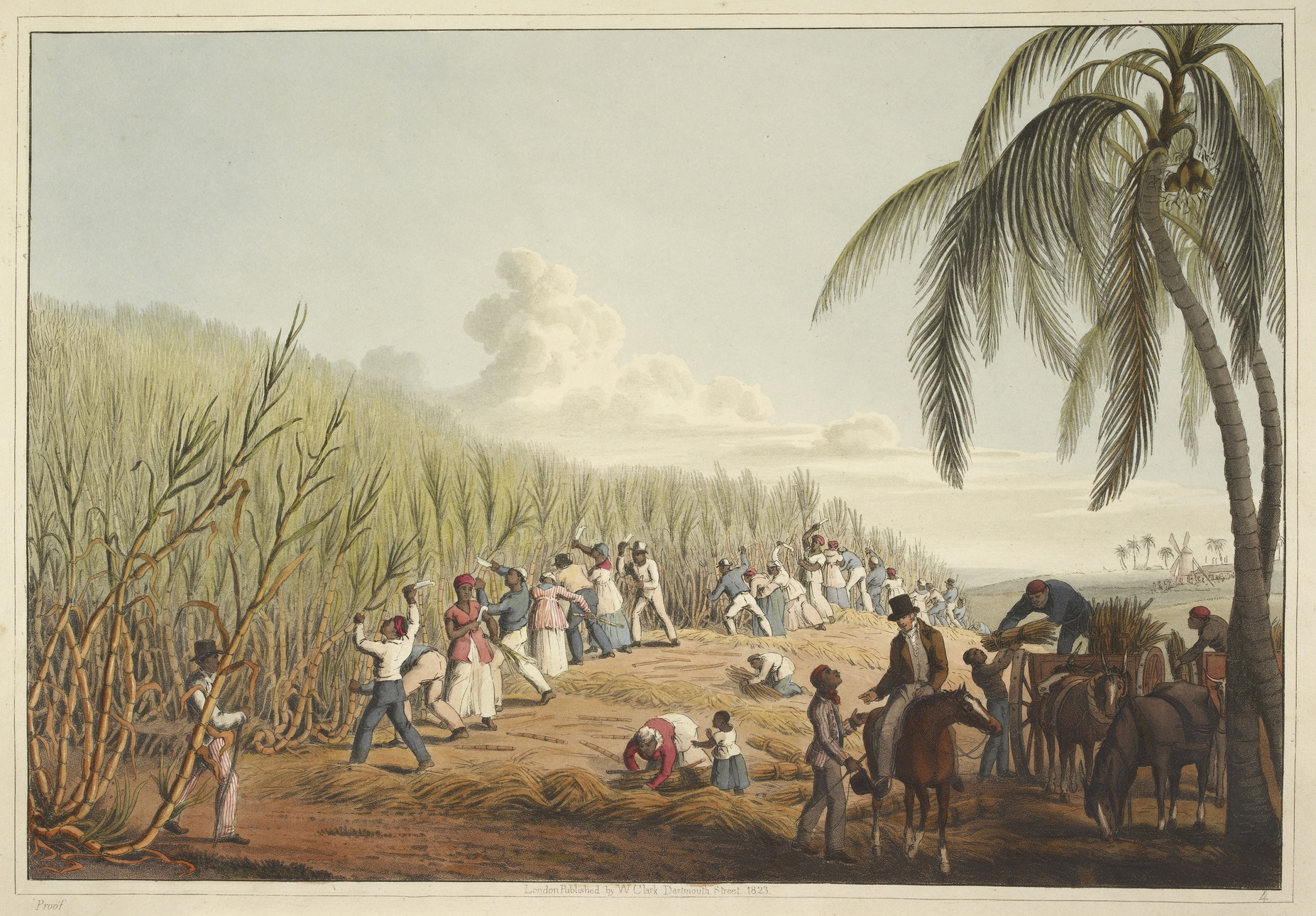
- Slaves cutting the sugar cane at Delaps in 1823

- Location within Antigua and Barbuda
- 17°03′33.3″N 61°45′40.5″W
- Location: Saint Paul, Antigua and Barbuda

History
- Built: 1700s

Historical Site of Antigua and Barbuda

Delaps is an official historic site in Saint Paul, Antigua and Barbuda. It was a sugar plantation established in the 1700s. The sugar mill tower continues to stand although it has since been converted into a water cistern. 213 people were enslaved here and at Long Lane at the time of emancipation.
