= Buckshorne's Estate =

Official historic site of Antigua and Barbuda

Buckshorne's
- Location within Antigua and Barbuda
- 17°02′22.1″N 61°47′00.2″W
- Location: Saint Paul, Antigua and Barbuda

History
- Built: 1740

Historical Site of Antigua and Barbuda

Buckshorne's is an official historic site in Saint Paul, Antigua and Barbuda. It was a sugar plantation established in 1740. The sugar mill tower continues to stand. In 1787 the plantation contained 250 acres.
