= Matthews, Antigua and Barbuda =

Official historic site of Antigua and Barbuda

Matthews
- Location within Antigua and Barbuda
- 17°03′22.7″N 61°47′36.5″W
- Location: Saint Paul, Antigua and Barbuda

History
- Built: 1725

Historical Site of Antigua and Barbuda

Matthews, also known as Constitution Hill, is an official historic site in Saint Paul, Antigua and Barbuda. It was a sugar plantation established in 1725. The sugar mill tower no longer stands. 158 people were enslaved here at the time of emancipation.
