= La Roche Estate =

Official historic site of Antigua and Barbuda

La Roche
- Location within Antigua and Barbuda
- 17°03′35.8″N 61°46′22.2″W
- Location: Saint Paul, Antigua and Barbuda

History
- Built: 1750s

Historical Site of Antigua and Barbuda

La Roche is an official historic site in Saint Paul, Antigua and Barbuda. It was a sugar plantation established in the 1750s. The sugar mill tower no longer stands. 110 people were enslaved here in 1829.
