= Ras Freeman =

Official historic site of Antigua and Barbuda

- Location within Antigua and Barbuda
- 17.05°N 61.7791°W
- Location: Saint Paul, Antigua and Barbuda

History
- Built: 1728 (Willis Freeman's slave plantation)

Historical Site of Antigua and Barbuda
- Official name: Willis Freeman's Estate

Ras Freeman is a Rastafari place of worship built on part of the former Willis Freeman's estate, an official historic site in Saint Paul, Antigua and Barbuda. Willis Freeman's was a sugar plantation established in 1728 and the estate's sugar mill tower continues to stand. 122 people were enslaved here at the time of emancipation.
