= Lucas's Estate =

Official historic site of Antigua and Barbuda

Lucas's
- Location within Antigua and Barbuda
- 17°03′20.0″N 61°45′55.8″W
- Location: Saint Paul, Antigua and Barbuda

History
- Built: 1673

Historical Site of Antigua and Barbuda

Lucas's, also known as Rock Hill, is an official historic site in Saint Paul, Antigua and Barbuda. It was a sugar plantation established in 1673. The sugar mill tower no longer stands. 110 people were enslaved here at the time of emancipation, and it was one of the oldest plantations on the island.
