= Dimsdale Estate =

Official historic site of Antigua and Barbuda

Dimsdale
- Location within Antigua and Barbuda
- 17°01′34.1″N 61°47′47.9″W
- Location: Saint Paul, Antigua and Barbuda

History
- Built: 1648

Historical Site of Antigua and Barbuda

Dimsdale is an official historic site in Saint Paul, Antigua and Barbuda. It was a sugar plantation established in 1648. The sugar mill tower continues to stand. It is one of the oldest plantations on the island and once contained 990 acres.
