= New North Sound Division =

Division of Antigua

New North Sound
- Division
- Coordinates: 17°07′N 61°48′W
- Country: Antigua and Barbuda
- Parish: Saint George

New North Sound is the sole division of Saint George, Antigua and Barbuda. While initially part of the parish of Saint Peter, in 1725 the division was split off to form its own parish, primarily due to residents of the division being distant from the parish church and services.
