= Rendezvous Bay =

Official historic site of Antigua and Barbuda

- Location within Antigua and Barbuda
- 17°01′02.2″N 61°48′28.7″W
- Location: Saint Paul; Saint Mary

History
- Built: Late 1600s

National Cultural Heritage of Antigua and Barbuda

Rendezvous Bay, sometimes referred to as Doig's, is an official historic site and former sugar estate on the border of Saint Paul and Saint Mary, Antigua and Barbuda. The area is home to one of the most famous beaches on the island, as well as a former village, Ding-a-Dong-Nook. Rendezvous Bay has popular hiking trails and a road to the area is occasionally graded. The estate had a sugar mill tower and the estates owners were given 587 pounds for 42 enslaved persons following emancipation in 1833.
