= Follys, Antigua and Barbuda =

Official historic site of Antigua and Barbuda

Follys
- Location within Antigua and Barbuda
- 17°02′29.2″N 61°48′28.0″W
- Location: Saint Paul, Antigua and Barbuda

History
- Built: 1691

Historical Site of Antigua and Barbuda

Follys, also known as Milly Byam's Estate, is an official historic site in Saint Paul, Antigua and Barbuda. It was a sugar plantation established in 1691. The sugar mill tower continues to stand. 243 people were enslaved here in 1829.

== See also ==
- Follys Ghaut
