= Morris Looby's Estate =

Official historic site of Antigua and Barbuda

Morris Looby's
- Location within Antigua and Barbuda
- 17°02′39.8″N 61°45′23.0″W
- Location: Saint Paul, Antigua and Barbuda

History
- Built: 1711

Historical Site of Antigua and Barbuda

Morris Looby's is an official historic site in Saint Paul, Antigua and Barbuda. It was a sugar plantation established in 1711. The sugar mill tower continues to stand. 284 people were enslaved here at the time of emancipation.
