= Adelin, Antigua and Barbuda =

Coordinates: 17.135643727619502°N 61.8465425939574°W

Adelin
- Village
- Location within Antigua and Barbuda
- Country: Antigua and Barbuda
- Island: Antigua
- Civil parish: Saint John Parish

Government
  - Type: Village Council(possibly dissolved)

Population (2011)
  - Total: 331
- Time zone: UTC-4 (AST)

Adelin (/ədɛlɪn/; North Antiguan: Adelin [ädɛlɪn]) is a village in Saint John Parish, Antigua and Barbuda.

== Demographics ==
Adelin has one enumeration district, ED 31500 Adelin.

Ethnic data
Q48 Ethnic	Counts	%
African descendent	290	87.67%
Caucasian/White	1	0.33%
East Indian/India	2	0.67%
Mixed (Black/White)	6	1.67%
Mixed (Other)	24	7.33%
Hispanic	3	1.00%
Other	1	0.33%
Don't know/Not stated	3	1.00%
Total	331	100.00%

Religion
Q49 Religion	Counts	%
Adventist	51	15.38%
Anglican	106	32.11%
Baptist	14	4.35%
Church of God	11	3.34%
Jehovah Witness	1	0.33%
Methodist	25	7.69%
Moravian	10	3.01%
Nazarene	4	1.34%
None/no religion	2	0.67%
Pentecostal	36	11.04%
Rastafarian	2	0.67%
Roman Catholic	23	7.02%
Wesleyan Holiness	4	1.34%
Other	23	7.02%
Don't know/Not stated	15	4.68%
Total	330	100.00%
NotApp :	1	

Internet use
Q55 Internet Use	Counts	%
Yes	211	63.67%
No	117	35.33%
Don't know/Not stated	3	1.00%
Total	331	100.00%

Country of birth
Q58. Country of birth	Counts	%
Other Latin or North American countries	1	0.33%
Antigua and Barbuda	237	71.67%
Other Caribbean countries	4	1.33%
Dominica	18	5.33%
Dominican Republic	2	0.67%
Guyana	24	7.33%
Jamaica	9	2.67%
Monsterrat	3	1.00%
St. Kitts and Nevis	1	0.33%
St. Lucia	4	1.33%
Trinidad and Tobago	6	1.67%
United Kingdom	2	0.67%
USA	13	4.00%
USVI United States Virgin Islands	1	0.33%
Not Stated	4	1.33%
Total	331	100.00%

Country of citizenship
Q71 Country of Citizenship 1	Counts	%
Antigua and Barbuda	267	80.67%
Other Caribbean countries	2	0.67%
Dominica	10	3.00%
Dominican Republic	2	0.67%
Guyana	20	6.00%
Jamaica	9	2.67%
Monsterrat	1	0.33%
St. Lucia	4	1.33%
Trinidad and Tobago	3	1.00%
USA	9	2.67%
Other countries	1	0.33%
Not Stated	2	0.67%
Total	331	100.00%

Country of second/dual citizenship
Q71 Country of Citizenship 2 (Country of Second/Dual Citizenship)	Counts	%
Other Caribbean countries	3	8.82%
Canada	2	5.88%
Other Asian and Middle Eastern countries	1	2.94%
Dominica	9	23.53%
Guyana	3	8.82%
Monsterrat	2	5.88%
St. Lucia	1	2.94%
Trinidad and Tobago	1	2.94%
United Kingdom	4	11.76%
USA	10	26.47%
Total	38	100.00%
NotApp :	294	
