= Saint Paul, Antigua and Barbuda =

Coordinates: 17°01′N 61°47′W

Parish of Saint Paul
- Parish
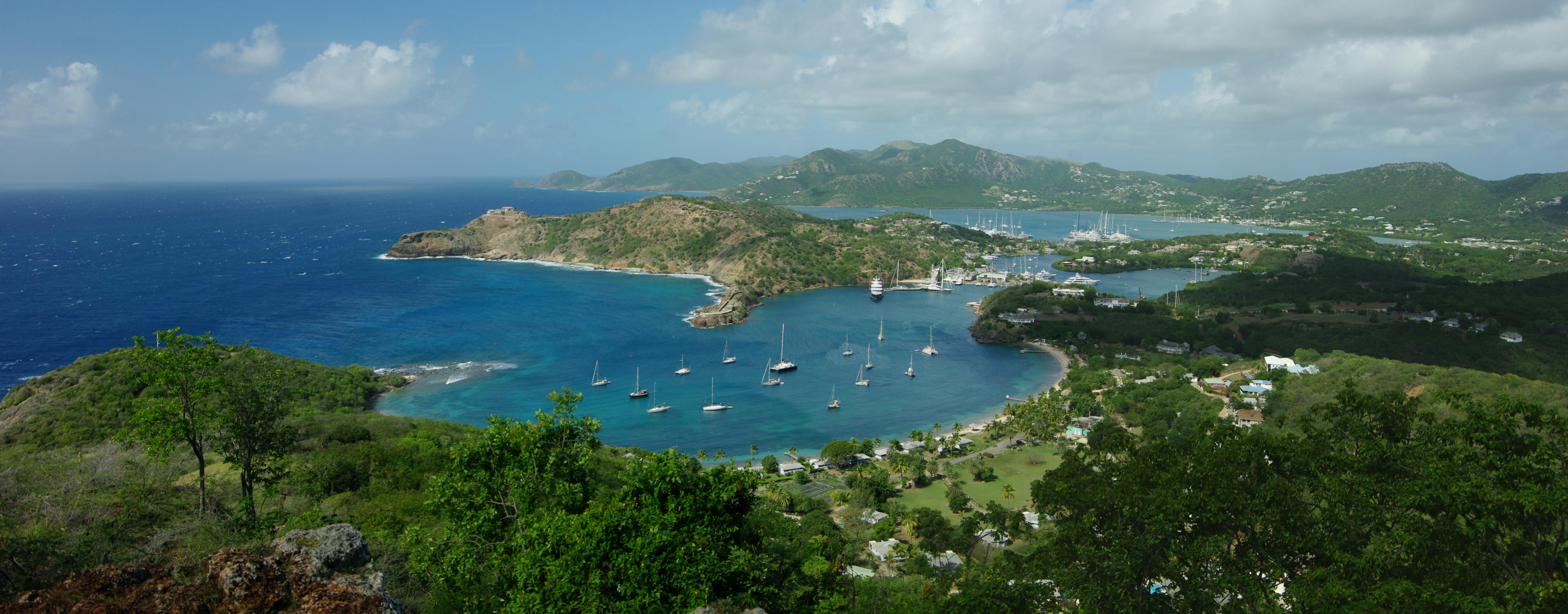
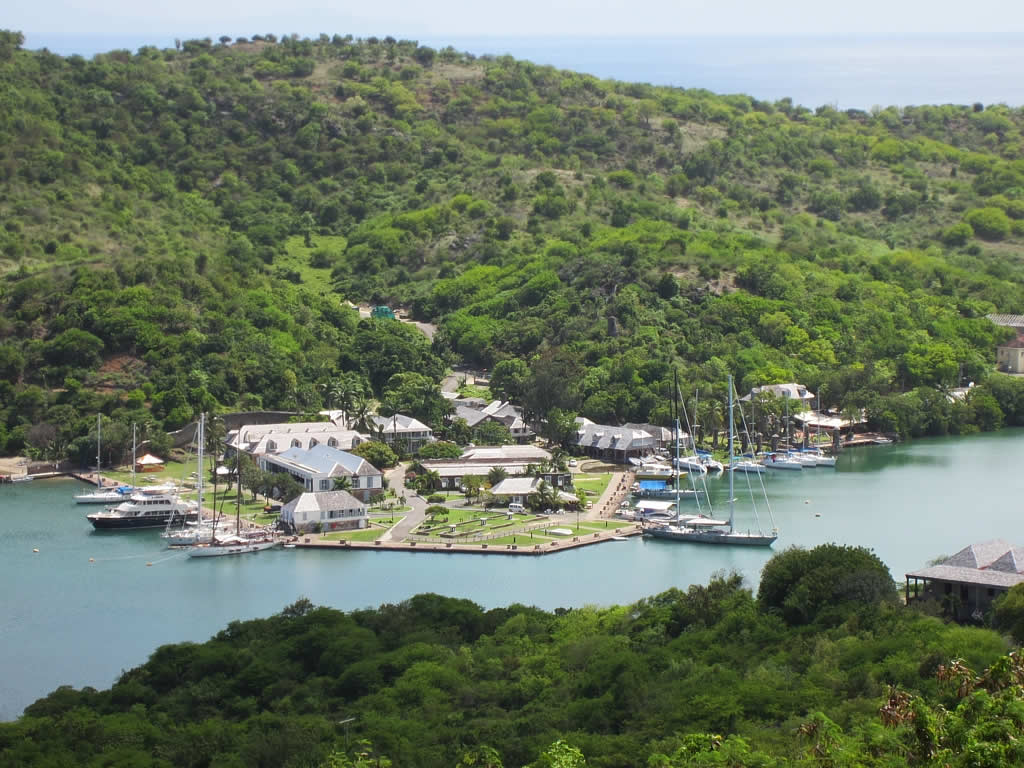
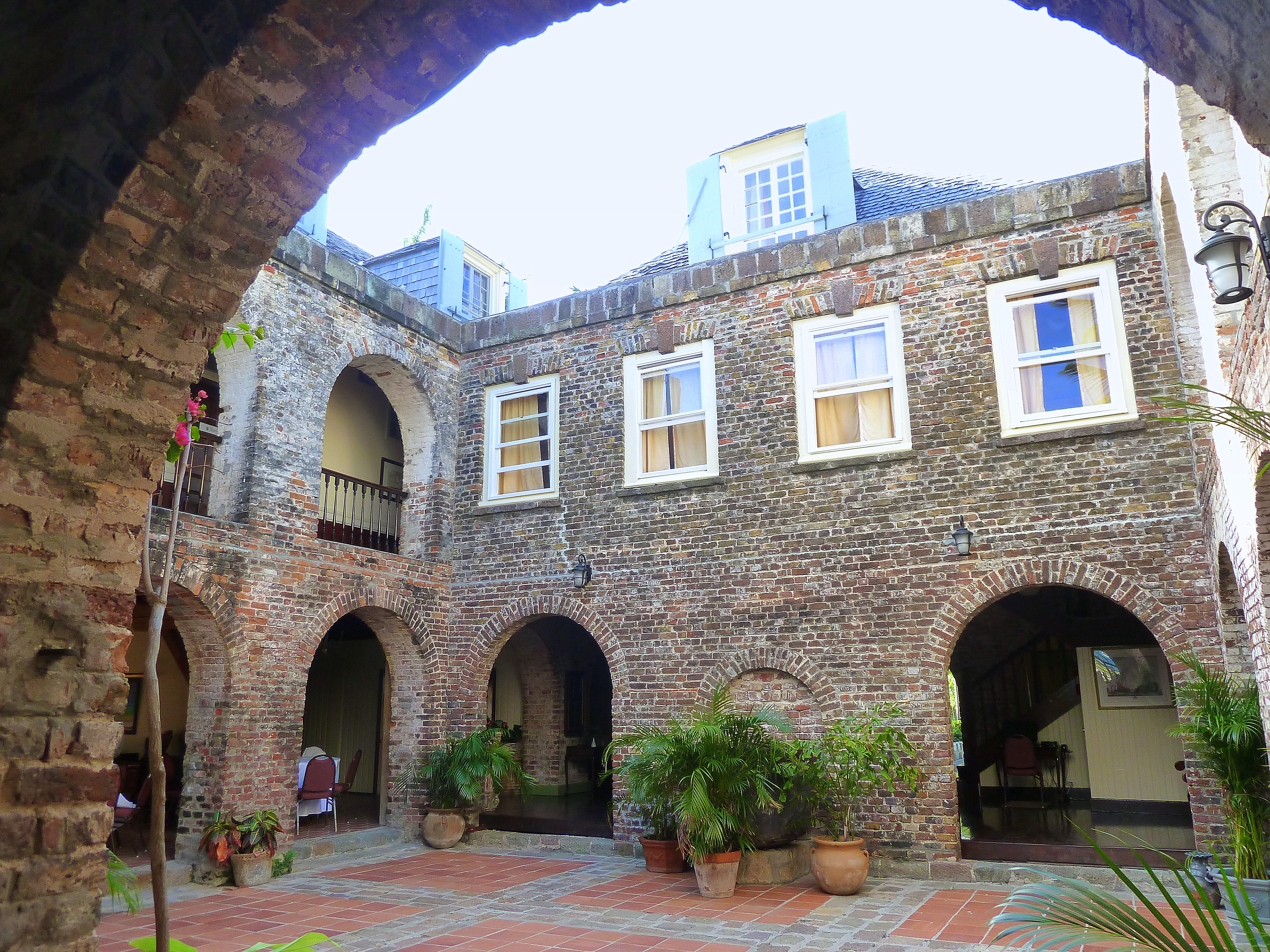
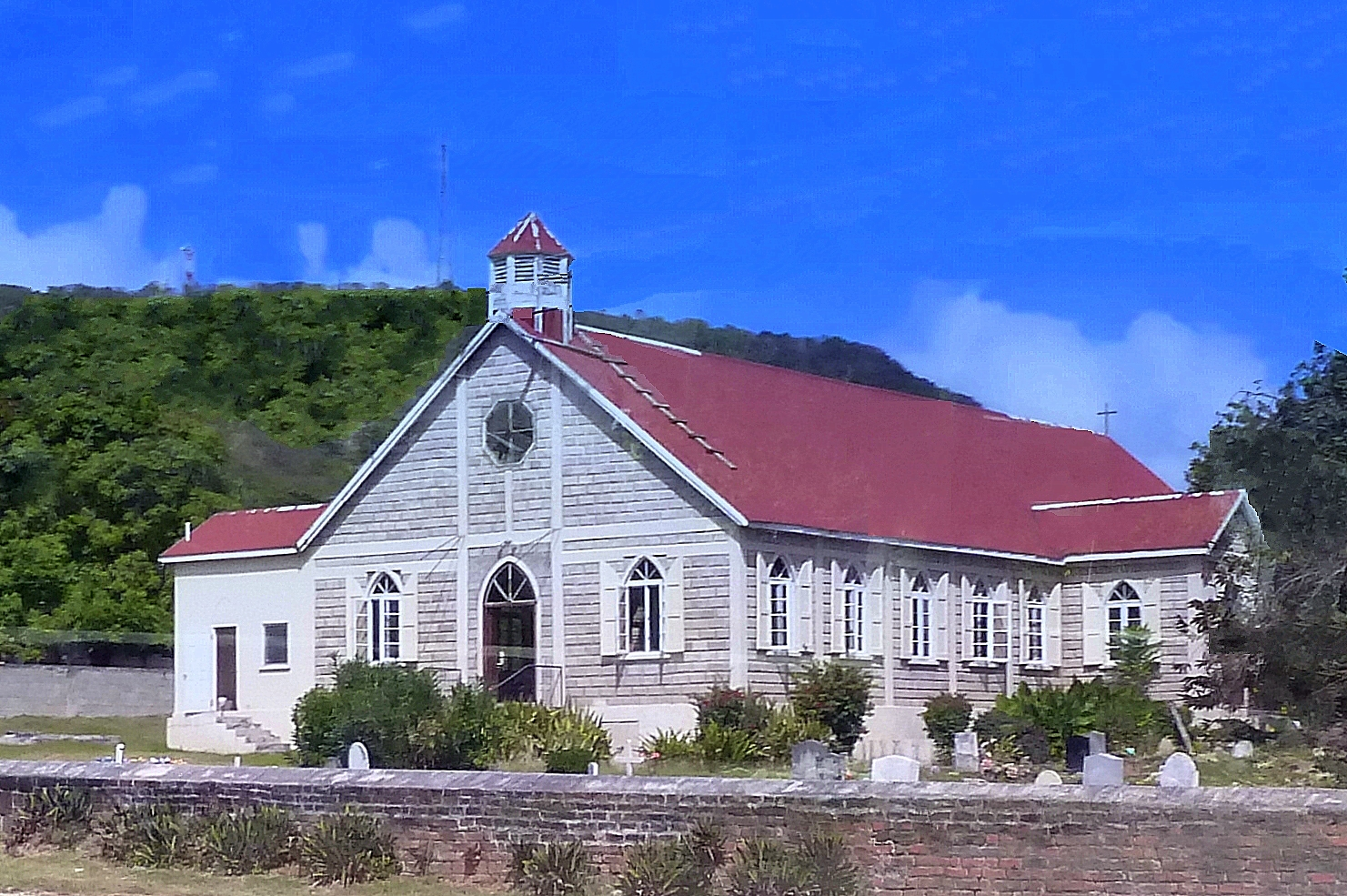
- (from top: left to right) View from Shirley Heights, Nelson's Dockyard, Copper and Lumber Store, St. Paul's Church

- Country: Antigua and Barbuda
- Established: 24 August 1681; 345 years ago (old style); 3 September 1681; 345 years ago (new style)
- Capital: Falmouth
- Largest city: Liberta

Government
  - MPs: Paul Chet Greene, Kiz Johnson, Jamale Pringle

Population
  - 2018 estimate: 9,004
  - Density: 179.54/km^{2} (465.0/sq mi)
- HDI (2023): ▲0.844 very high · 4th
- Time zone: UTC-4 (AST)

Saint Paul (Antiguan and Barbudan Creole: Sen Paal), officially the Parish of Saint Paul, is a parish of Antigua and Barbuda on the island of Antigua. It had an estimated population of 9,004 in 2018. The parish capital, and the location of the parish church, is Falmouth. The main economic and tourism hub of the parish is English Harbour.

Saint Paul borders Saint Peter and Saint John to the north, Saint Mary to the west, and Saint Philip to the east. Saint Paul is dominated by farmland in the north, with various creeks and Potworks Dam marking its northern border, and low-lying hills to the south, defining its western border with Saint Mary. The largest city fully within the parish is Liberta, the third largest city in the country. Saint Paul was permanently established with the other four original parishes in 1692.

Saint Paul is mostly dominated by tourism and agriculture, with most settlement in the parish being based around Tyrells Main Road and Matthews Road. The northeastern portion of the parish is very sparsely populated with the only settlement in this region being Bethesda. The eastern coast of the parish along Willoughby Bay also has a very low population, with little exception. Saint Paul has very few islands, but many peninsulas.

Saint Paul is a major tourism hub on the island. Saint Paul is different from the rest of Antigua as it is not a major hub for beach tourism, rather, most tourism activity centres around yachting, restaurants, and historical sites. Saint Paul is home to many amenities and facilities that would only be seen in St. John's City, due to its tourism and yachting importance. Saint Paul is home to English Harbour and Falmouth Harbour, some of the most important harbours in the country. Saint Paul is home to many marinas, one of the only ports of entry in the country, and a station of the Antigua and Barbuda Coast Guard.

Saint Paul was created in August 1681, when Antigua was divided into five parishes. Saint Paul and the four other parishes were permanently established in July 1692, and confirmed in January 1693. The primary objective of the establishment of parishes was providing for the parish church. A large portion of the parish's lands were used for agricultural purposes. Numerous historical relics from the parish can still be seen today, including the Savannah and Guinea Bush plantations.

== History ==
The parishes are the highest administrative units of the state of Antigua and Barbuda. The main church of this parish was today's church of St. Paul's Rectory in Falmouth. Falmouth was the first part of Antigua to be settled by the British, in 1632. Governor Warner resided close to Falmouth Bay by 1640. The village was settled by English people. Falmouth was the same size of the rising St. John's City in 1689.

Historically, the parish was divided into the Falmouth Division (Falmouth, today's Liberta and Swetes) with the "Ten Acre Lands" (state property around English Harbour, which was allotted for small farms), Rendezvous Bay Division (the western mountain country behind Rendezvous Bay) and the Willoughby Bay Division (around Bethesda). The former and the western parts of the Willoughby Bay Division were also confirmed to be part of the parish in 1873 under the Parish Boundaries Act.

After the abolition of slavery in 1834, the first freed settlement was created here was Liberta. The community was founded in 1834 and was given the name "Liberty". The community was founded due to many liberated Black Antiguans having an interest in land ownership. Owners charged $30 for 30 by 50-foot property lots. Many built two-room houses. The Hamlet, a cluster of houses close to Liberta that was formerly part of the Tyrells property, was eventually absorbed into Liberta after 1842. The region was particularly affected by the great earthquake in 1843, to the extent that there were several migrations, especially to Freetown. Around 1856 the parish included the estates of Blakes, Bodkins, Burkes, Cochranes, Delaps, Follys, La Roche, Lucas's, Matthews, Morris Looby's, Pattersons, Richmonds, Thomas's, Tyrells, Willis's, Rendezvous Bay, Buckshorne's and the already abandoned Barter's and Dimsdale– most of the farms existed until the 1950s– some to today. These farms envolved into the nucleuses of places such as English Harbour, Falmouth, The Ridge, Victoria, Bethesda, Grace Hill, Liberta, Buckshorns, Edwards, Swetes, Jenny Bush, Spring Hill, Bailey Hill and Ding-a-Dong-Nook.

The mid-south around Falmouth Harbour and Shirley Heights is one of the tourist centers of Antigua, otherwise the area is farmland, once for tobacco plantations, then for sugarcane plantations. Today, agricultural products of all kinds are produced. The population increased by 3.6% between 2001 and 2011, with population growth well below the national average of 11.3%.

== Geography ==
Most of the population of the parish is in the western half along the Tyrells Main Road and Matthews Road, and in the English Harbour/Falmouth area. The only village in the eastern half of the parish is Bethesda. Most of the inhabited areas of the parish are very hilly, and most of the uninhabited areas are dense forest or are flat agricultural lands. The parish is separated from the rest of the island by various small creeks that mark the parishes northern border. The parish is also home to many ponds, including one of the largest water bodies in the country, Potworks Dam. The northeastern half of the parish was home to much of Antigua's historic rail infrastructure in 1891. The southern coast of the parish is dominated by many coral reefs.

== Demographics ==
Saint Paul had a 2011 population of 8,116. Saint Paul is not a particularly diverse parish. However, there are many ethnic groups, like African descendants, who as of 2011 make up 91.24% of the population, white people (3.52%), East Indians (0.33%), mixed black/white people (0.61%), other mixed (2.01%), Hispanic people (0.90%), others (0.76%), and those who didn't know or didn't state (0.63%). There are also many religious groups, Adventists (14.07%), Anglicans (13.93%), Moravians (12.97%), Pentecostals (10.00%), irreligious people (5.05%), and Rastafarians (1.31%).

Saint Paul has people from many countries, country of birth groups in 2011 included people born in Africa (0.29%), other Latin American or North American countries (0.25%), Antigua and Barbuda (75.92%), other Caribbean countries (0.68%), Canada (0.29%), other Asian countries (0.21%), other European countries (0.67%), Dominica (2.14%), Dominican Republic (0.72%), Guyana (5.02%), Jamaica (4.98%), one of the most significant Jamaican minorities in the country, Montserrat (0.34%), St. Kitts and Nevis (0.37%), St. Lucia (0.42%), St. Vincent and the Grenadines (0.59%), Trinidad and Tobago (0.29%), United Kingdom (2.04%), United States (3.19%), United States Virgin Islands (0.68%), and not stated (0.93%).

== Economy ==
Out of the 3,738 workers in the parish in 2011, 19.70% were paid government employees, 5.62% were paid statutory body employees, 52.43% were paid private employees, 2.75% were paid private home employees, 4.74% were self-employed without paid employees, 12.23% were self-employed without paid employees, 1.39% were other categories of employees, and 1.14% didn't know or didn't state. Out of the 416 business owners in the parish, 29.08% made under EC$1,000 per month from their business, 19.39% made $1,000 to $1,999 per month, 14.54% made $2,000 to $2,999 per month, 19.64% made $3,000 to $4,999, and 17.35% made $5,000+. In 2011, 81.32% of workers had a fixed place of work outside the home, 3.18% worked from home, 12.97% had no fixed place of work, and 2.53% didn't know or didn't state.
