= Bodkin's Estate =

Official historic site of Antigua and Barbuda

Bodkin's
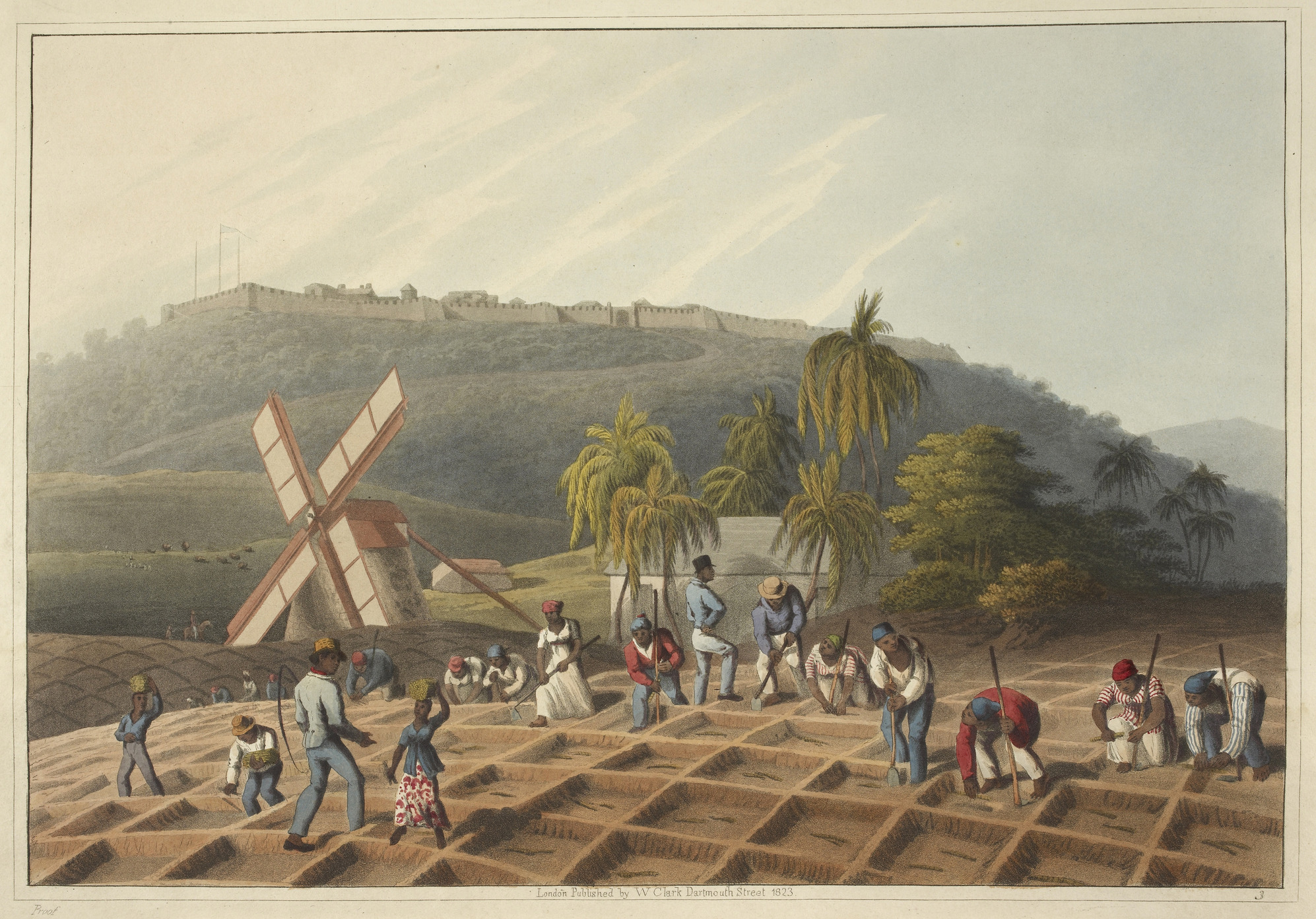
- Planting the Sugar Cane on Bodkins Estate, William Clark

- Location within Antigua and Barbuda
- 17°02′36.0″N 61°46′01.5″W
- Location: Saint Paul, Antigua and Barbuda

History
- Built: 1690

Historical Site of Antigua and Barbuda

Bodkin's is an official historic site in Saint Paul, Antigua and Barbuda. It was a sugar plantation established in 1690. The sugar mill tower continues to stand. 394 people were enslaved here at the time of emancipation.
