= Freemans, Antigua and Barbuda =

Freemans
- Village
- Freemansville
- Freemans in 2023
- Interactive map of the Freemans main place
- Location in Antigua and Barbuda
- Coordinates: 17°04′46″N 61°47′07″W
- Country: Antigua and Barbuda
- Island: Antigua
- Civil parish: Saint Peter

Area
  - Total: 2.51 km^{2} (0.97 sq mi)

Population (2011)
  - Total: 860
  - Density: 342.6/km^{2} (887/sq mi)
- Time zone: UTC-4 (AST)

Freemans is a village located in Saint Peter Parish on the island of Antigua, in Antigua and Barbuda.

It is located to the southeast of Sea View Farm and northwest of Potworks Dam.

The village claims to be the most central village on Antigua, and is known for producing five centenarians.

== Geography ==
According to legend, "Freeman's Village" would be located right in the middle of the island of Antigua, if one were to map its length and breadth. The majority of the people in that community are convinced that this is an undeniable fact. That desirable designation has received a lot of attention, to the point where greeting signs at the village's entrances now display it. One such sign still stands at the eastern gate and displays the neighborhood's boasting rights. Freeman's Village is brashly referred to as “The Most Central Village In The Island”.

Although some locals assert that Freeman's Village lies exactly in the middle of the island, it is important to keep in mind that it is a small, landlocked community that shares borders with other settlements. A two- or three-degree change can have a significant impact.

== History ==
The idea that the village's name came about as a result of the abolition of slavery is one of the mystiques connected to that neighborhood. Freeman's Village was first called "Francibell." The welcome sign also includes this information. (In Sir Keithlyn Smith's book, "To Shot Hard Labor," the version "Franchie Bell" can be found on page 54.

It is also claimed that following liberation, some former slaves relocated to that region and each of the men started announcing, "Today, I am a free man," with pride. As a result, the place was given the name Freeman's Village.

Documents kept at the Antigua Museum reveal that Free-Estate man's existed before slavery was abolished in 1834. Marmaduke Robinson was handed 360 acres of Arthur Freeman's estate in 1779. Robinson may have been given management or rental rights to the plantation by the Free- men, who were absentee landlords.

Free communities began to spring up in remote areas, such as the south-western hills of Antigua, after emancipation, which eventually occurred on Friday, August 1, 1834 (when 29,000 Antiguan slaves were set free). Since Antigua was the only island in the Leeward Islands to skip the four-year apprenticeship requirement recommended by Britain, Antiguan slaves were the first to be freed in the British West Indies.

As in Liberta, some planters sold their laborers land plots. Numerous towns have names that have "freedom" connotations; examples include Freetown, Freemansville, and Liberta.

This fact supports the claim that the initial settlers' sense of pride led to the creation of the name "Freemansville." Others may dare to assert that it was only a coincidence that the former proprietors of the nearby plantation "Freeman's Estate" and their neighboring community "Freemansville" shared a significant portion of their names.

Inigo Thomas, a member of parliament and absentee slave owner, was given compensation together with his brother-in-law for the Lower Freeman's estate in 1852. He also claimed the Winthorpes Estate (#56) and the Galley Bay Estate (#30) as tenants-for-life. Inigo's son, Freeman Thomas, received payment for these two lands. The son, who was given the Thomas family's English estates at Ralton, in Willington, and Yapton, in West Sussex, changed his name from Inigo Freeman to Thomas in 1789.

It should be mentioned that in that area of the island, there were four estates that were near to one another. Naturally, these were all sugar plantations. Freeman's Village was surrounded by Bellevue to the west, Freeman's on the northern side, Sanderson's on the eastern side, and Jonas on the southern-eastern side. After being freed from slavery, it is known that the former slaves continued to labor on the plantations.

The plantation owners, who were unaccustomed to working with a labor force of liberated men and women, tried all in their power to sabotage the former slaves' ascent to independence. The employees were mistreated just as cruelly as before.

Also, it is claimed that the settlement was one of the first in this nation to be founded by freed slaves. It has been demonstrated that this assertion is accurate.

Freemansville became the second village to be formed in Antigua after the abolition of slavery in 1834. "Francibell" or "Franchie Bell" was its original name. Its name was eventually modified. Freemansville had 12 homes and a Methodist church in 1890.

There were about 30 communities in Antigua by 1840. Because the planters did not want to develop housing on the estates because the laborers did not want to live there following the catastrophic earthquake of 1843, these settlements flourished quickly. They want independence from the planters so that they could better bargain for their pay.

Around this period, camels were introduced by plantation owner Freeman to work on his estate. As a source of food, date palms (phoenix reclinata) were transported with these animals. The camels found Antigua to be considerably more humid than the deserts of Africa, and many died from foot problems. The reason there are so many date palms in the area is because they survived. Nevertheless, due to the climate in Antigua, the palms do not produce the familiar, luscious and fleshy dates.

Freeman's Village, as stated on the greeting sign posted at the eastern entrance to the community, calls itself "The most distinctive settlement in Antigua and possibly the world." The sign-board that reads, "Freeman's Village has produced five (5) centenarians, two of whom are a father and his son," also explains the basis for this outrageous claim.

== Borders ==
The town borders All Saint's, Sea View Farm, Vernons, Upper Lightfoot's, and Diamonds.

== Demographics ==
Freemans has two enumeration districts.

- FreemansVille-North (ED 50600)
- FreemansVille-South (ED 50500)

=== Census data ===
Q48 Ethnic	Counts	%
African descendent	816	94.87%
Mixed (Black/White)	10	1.19%
Mixed (Other)	25	2.86%
Other	2	0.24%
Don't know/Not stated	7	0.83%
Total	860	100.00%

Q49 Religion	Counts	%
Adventist	101	11.88%
Anglican	71	8.28%
Baptist	17	2.04%
Church of God	64	7.44%
Evangelical	18	2.16%
Jehovah Witness	23	2.64%
Methodist	331	38.78%
Moravian	25	2.88%
Nazarene	9	1.08%
None/no religion	42	4.92%
Pentecostal	66	7.68%
Rastafarian	7	0.84%
Roman Catholic	29	3.36%
Weslyan Holiness	13	1.56%
Other	22	2.52%
Don't know/Not stated	16	1.92%
Total	854	100.00%
NotApp :	6	

Q58. Country of birth	Counts	%
Antigua and Barbuda	674	78.43%
Other Caribbean countries	3	0.36%
Canada	5	0.60%
Dominica	47	5.48%
Guyana	33	3.81%
Jamaica	35	4.05%
Monsterrat	2	0.24%
St. Kitts and Nevis	3	0.36%
St. Lucia	4	0.48%
St. Vincent and the Grenadines	4	0.48%
Trinidad and Tobago	1	0.12%
United Kingdom	5	0.60%
USA	23	2.62%
USVI United States Virgin Islands	5	0.60%
Not Stated	15	1.79%
Total	860	100.00%

Q71 Country of Citizenship 1	Counts	%
Antigua and Barbuda	737	85.70%
Other Caribbean countries	3	0.36%
Canada	1	0.12%
Dominica	30	3.46%
Guyana	28	3.22%
Jamaica	32	3.69%
Monsterrat	2	0.24%
St. Lucia	4	0.48%
St. Vincent and the Grenadines	2	0.24%
United Kingdom	1	0.12%
USA	11	1.31%
Not Stated	9	1.07%
Total	860	100.00%

Q71 Country of Citizenship 2 (Country of Second Citizenship)	Counts	%
Other Caribbean countries	2	2.63%
Canada	8	10.53%
Dominica	12	15.79%
Guyana	5	6.58%
Jamaica	5	6.58%
St. Lucia	1	1.32%
St. Vincent and the Grenadines	2	2.63%
Trinidad and Tobago	1	1.32%
United Kingdom	11	14.47%
USA	30	38.16%
Total	78	100.00%
NotApp :	782	

== See also ==
- Category:Antigua
