= Paradise View =

- Village
- Interactive map of Paradise View
- Coordinates: 17°08′59.71″N 61°50′27.56″W
- Country: Antigua and Barbuda
- Parish: Saint John

Area
  - Total: 0.28 km^{2} (0.11 sq mi)

Population (2011)
  - Total: 200

Paradise View is a village in Saint John, Antigua and Barbuda. It had a population of 200 people in 2011.

== Geography ==
According to the Antigua and Barbuda Statistics Division, the village had a total area of 0.18 square kilometres in 2011.

== Demographics ==
There were 200 people living in Paradise View as of the 2011 census. The village had a diverse ethnic composition, including 61.33% African, 15.47% white, and 11.05% other mixed. The population was born in different countries, including 50.83% in Antigua and Barbuda, 7.18% in the United States, and 6.08% in Jamaica. The population had diverse religious affiliations, including 32.22% Anglican and 19.44% Catholic.
