= Bellevue Heights, Antigua and Barbuda =

Coordinates: 17°5′35″N 61°49′15″W

Bellevue Heights
- Village
- Interactive map of Bellevue Heights
- Country: Antigua and Barbuda
- Parish: Saint John

Area
  - Total: 0.87 km^{2} (0.34 sq mi)

Population (2011)
  - Total: 453

Bellevue Heights is a village in Saint John, Antigua and Barbuda. It had a population of 453 people in 2011.

== Geography ==
According to the Antigua and Barbuda Statistics Division, the village had a total area of 0.87 square kilometres in 2011.

== Demographics ==
There were 453 people living in Bellevue Heights as of the 2011 census. The village was 87.07% African, 7.56% other mixed, 1.46% white, 1.22% Syrian/Lebanese, 0.73% mixed black/white, and the remainder from various other ethnic groups. The population was born in different countries, including 66.59% in Antigua and Barbuda, 6.59% in Guyana, 4.63% in the United States, 3.90% in Dominica, 3.17% in Jamaica, 2.44% in Trinidad and Tobago, and the remainder from various other countries. The population had diverse religious affiliations, including 22.79% Anglican and 13.24% Catholic.
