= Barbuda-North =

Barbuda-North Baabyuuda-Nawt
- Village and enumeration district
- Location within Antigua and Barbuda
- Coordinates: 17°40′26″N 61°48′44″W
- Country: Antigua and Barbuda
- Island: Barbuda
- Major division: Rest of Barbuda

Population (2011)
  - Total: 296
- Time zone: UTC-4 (AST)

Barbuda North is a village and enumeration district on the island of Barbuda.

== Demographics ==
Barbuda-North has one enumeration district, ED 90600 Barbuda-North. Before the 2011 census it had enumeration district 90400.

=== Census data (2011) ===
Ethnicity
Q48 Ethnic	Counts	%
African descendent	296	100.00%
Total	296	100.00%

Religion
Q49 Religion	Counts	%
Adventist	37	12.37%
Anglican	36	12.03%
Baptist	47	15.81%
Church of God	1	0.34%
Evangelical	14	4.81%
Methodist	1	0.34%
Nazarene	2	0.69%
None/no religion	7	2.41%
Pentecostal	73	24.74%
Rastafarian	23	7.90%
Roman Catholic	1	0.34%
Weslyan Holiness	25	8.59%
Other	25	8.59%
Don't know/Not stated	3	1.03%
Total	296	100.00%

Insurance
Q53 Insurance	Counts	%
Yes	156	52.58%
No	141	47.42%
Total	296	100.00%

Social security
Q54.1 Social Security	Counts	%
No	9	5.88%
Yes	147	94.12%
Total	156	100.00%
NotApp :	141	

Internet use
Q55 Internet Use	Counts	%
Yes	99	33.33%
No	198	66.67%
Total	296	100.00%

Country of birth
Q58. Country of birth	Counts	%
Antigua and Barbuda	272	91.75%
Other Caribbean countries	1	0.34%
Canada	1	0.34%
Dominica	4	1.37%
Guyana	11	3.78%
Jamaica	2	0.69%
St. Kitts and Nevis	2	0.69%
United Kingdom	2	0.69%
USVI United States Virgin Islands	1	0.34%
Total	296	100.00%

Lived overseas
Q61 Lived Overseas	Counts	%
Yes	42	15.36%
No	230	84.64%
Total	272	100.00%
NotApp :	24	

Country of citizenship
Q71 Country of Citizenship 1	Counts	%
Antigua and Barbuda	278	93.81%
Other Caribbean countries	1	0.34%
Dominica	3	1.03%
Guyana	10	3.44%
Jamaica	2	0.69%
United Kingdom	1	0.34%
USA	1	0.34%
Total	296	100.00%

Country of second/dual citizenship
Q71 Country of Citizenship 2 (Country of Second/Dual Citizenship)	Counts	%
Other Caribbean countries	1	6.67%
Canada	1	6.67%
Dominica	2	13.33%
Guyana	1	6.67%
Montserrat	2	13.33%
United Kingdom	5	33.33%
USA	3	20.00%
Total	15	100.00%
NotApp :	281	

Business earning
Q91 Business Earning	Counts	%
Under 1,000 $EC per month	5	26.32%
1,000 to 1,999 $EC per month	4	21.05%
2,000 to 2,999 $EC per month	3	15.79%
3,000 to 4,999 $EC per month	4	21.05%
5,000 $EC and over per month	3	15.79%
Total	19	100.00%
NotApp :	277	
