= Crosbies =

Crobies
- Village
- Interactive map of the Crosbies main place
- Location within Antigua and Barbuda
- Coordinates: 17°10′0.41″N 61°49′31.58″W
- Country: Antigua and Barbuda
- Island: Antigua
- Civil parish: Saint John Parish

Government
  - Type: Village Council (possibly dissolved)

Population (2011)
  - Total: 788
- Time zone: UTC-4 (AST)

Crosbies is a village in Saint John Parish, Antigua and Barbuda.

== Demographics ==
Crosbies has three enumeration districts.

- 30700 Crosbies-Sandpiper
- 30800 Crosbies-Mill Tower
- 30900 Crosbies-W.I.O.C.

=== Census data (2011) ===
==== Individual ====
Q48 Ethnic	Counts	%
African descendent	255	32.35%
Caucasian/White	128	16.25%
East Indian/India	33	4.20%
Mixed (Black/White)	25	3.22%
Mixed (Other)	161	20.45%
Hispanic	13	1.68%
Syrian/Lebanese	124	15.69%
Other	42	5.32%
Don't know/Not stated	7	0.84%
Total	788	100.00%

Q49 Religion	Counts	%
Adventist	32	4.13%
Anglican	121	15.65%
Baptist	15	1.99%
Church of God	6	0.71%
Evangelical	6	0.71%
Jehovah Witness	8	1.00%
Methodist	44	5.69%
Moravian	20	2.56%
Nazarene	1	0.14%
None/no religion	38	4.84%
Pentecostal	17	2.13%
Rastafarian	2	0.28%
Roman Catholic	335	43.10%
Weslyan Holiness	9	1.14%
Other	96	12.38%
Don't know/Not stated	28	3.56%
Total	776	100.00%
NotApp :	12	

Q55 Internet Use	Counts	%
Yes	619	78.57%
No	163	20.73%
Don't know/Not stated	6	0.70%
Total	788	100.00%

Q58. Country of birth	Counts	%
Africa	8	0.98%
Other Latin or North American countries	12	1.54%
Antigua and Barbuda	316	40.06%
Other Caribbean countries	31	3.92%
Canada	21	2.66%
Other Asian countries	35	4.48%
Other European countries	21	2.66%
Dominica	18	2.24%
Dominican Republic	3	0.42%
Guyana	42	5.32%
Jamaica	14	1.82%
Monsterrat	4	0.56%
St. Kitts and Nevis	4	0.56%
St. Lucia	2	0.28%
St. Vincent and the Grenadines	6	0.70%
Syria	44	5.60%
Trinidad and Tobago	44	5.60%
United Kingdom	40	5.04%
USA	96	12.18%
USVI United States Virgin Islands	2	0.28%
Not Stated	24	3.08%
Total	788	100.00%

Q61 Lived Overseas	Counts	%
Yes	98	31.12%
No	212	67.13%
Don't know/Not stated	6	1.75%
Total	316	100.00%
NotApp :	473	

Q71 Country of Citizenship 1	Counts	%
Antigua and Barbuda	544	69.05%
Other Caribbean countries	13	1.68%
Canada	9	1.12%
Other Asian and Middle Eastern countries	42	5.32%
Dominica	4	0.56%
Dominican Republic	2	0.28%
Guyana	18	2.24%
Jamaica	10	1.26%
Monsterrat	1	0.14%
Trinidad and Tobago	19	2.38%
United Kingdom	18	2.24%
USA	66	8.40%
Other countries	27	3.36%
Not Stated	15	1.96%
Total	788	100.00%

Q71 Country of Citizenship 2 (Country of Second/Dual Citizenship)	Counts	%
Other Caribbean countries	22	7.84%
Canada	30	10.59%
Other Asian and Middle Eastern countries	30	10.59%
Dominica	14	5.10%
Dominican Republic	1	0.39%
Guyana	19	6.67%
Jamaica	6	1.96%
Monsterrat	3	1.18%
St. Lucia	2	0.78%
St. Vincent and the Grenadines	6	1.96%
Trinidad and Tobago	22	7.84%
United Kingdom	36	12.94%
USA	70	24.71%
Other countries	21	7.45%
Total	282	100.00%
NotApp :	507	

==== Household ====
There are 382 households in Crosbies.

Q2 Main Material of outer walls	Counts	%
Concrete	104	27.23%
Concrete/ Blocks	260	68.06%
Wood	7	1.83%
Wood and brick	1	0.26%
Wood and concrete	7	1.83%
Other (inc. improvised, stone, stone and brick)	3	0.79%
Total	382	100.00%

Q3 Main roofing material	Counts	%
Concrete	4	1.05%
Sheet metal	324	84.82%
Shingle (asphalt)	38	9.95%
Shingle (Other)	10	2.62%
Shingle (wood)	3	0.79%
Other (inc. improvised, tarpaulin, tile)	3	0.79%
Total	382	100.00%

Q4 Year built	Counts	%
Before 1980	84	21.99%
1980–1989	40	10.47%
1990–1999	46	12.04%
2000–2006	34	8.90%
Year 2007	9	2.36%
Year 2008	1	0.26%
Year 2009	4	1.05%
Year 2010	7	1.83%
Don't Know/not stated	157	41.10%
Total	382	100.00%

Q5 Type of dwelling	Counts	%
Separate house	276	72.25%
Part of a private house	9	2.36%
Flat/apartment/condo	76	19.90%
Double house/duplex	8	2.09%
Business & dwelling	1	0.26%
Other (inc. townhouse, barracks)	4	1.05%
Do not know/Not stated	8	2.09%
Total	382	100.00%

Q6 Type of ownership	Counts	%
Owned with mortgage	53	13.87%
Owned outright	127	33.25%
Rent free	4	1.05%
Rented Private	137	35.86%
Other (inc. leased, rented Gov., squatted)	3	0.79%
Do not know/Not stated	58	15.18%
Total	382	100.00%

Q7 Land tenure	Counts	%
Leasehold	2	0.52%
Owned/Freehold	185	48.43%
Rented	83	21.73%
Rented free	4	1.05%
Other (inc. permission to work land, sharecropping, squatted)	14	3.66%
Don't know/not stated	94	24.61%
Total	382	100.00%

Q11 Garbage disposal	Counts	%
Garbage truck Private	9	2.36%
Garbage truck Public	366	95.81%
Other (inc. burning, burying, compost, dumping)	1	0.26%
Don't know/Not stated	6	1.57%
Total	382	100.00%

Q12 Main source of water	Counts	%
Private, piped into dwelling	11	2.88%
Public standpipe	2	0.52%
Public piped into dwelling	298	78.01%
Public piped into dwelling	4	1.05%
Cistern/tank	55	14.40%
Other (inc. private not into dwelling, well/tank, spring/river)	3	0.79%
Don't know/Not stated	9	2.36%
Total	382	100.00%

Q23 3a Desktop Computer	Counts	%
Yes	114	29.84%
No	253	66.23%
Not Stated	15	3.93%
Total	382	100.00%

Q23 3b Laptop Computer	Counts	%
Yes	230	60.21%
No	137	35.86%
Not Stated	15	3.93%
Total	382	100.00%

Q23 9 Mobile Device	Counts	%
Yes	284	74.35%
No	83	21.73%
Not Stated	15	3.93%
Total	382	100.00%

Q23 10 Radio	Counts	%
Yes	164	42.93%
No	203	53.14%
Not Stated	15	3.93%
Total	382	100.00%

Q24 Motor Vehicles	Counts	%
0	24	7.97%
1	143	47.51%
2	106	35.22%
3	19	6.31%
4 or more	9	2.99%
Total	301	100.00%
Missing :	81	

Q25 4 Internet access	Counts	%
No	108	28.27%
Yes	249	65.18%
Don't know/not declared	25	6.54%
Total	382	100.00%

Q27 Crime Reported	Counts	%
Yes	16	34.04%
No	7	14.89%
Don't know/Not stated	24	51.06%
Total	47	100.00%
NotApp :	335	
