= Barter's Estate =

Official historic site of Antigua and Barbuda

Barter's
- Location within Antigua and Barbuda
- 17°01′22.9″N 61°48′12.5″W
- Location: Saint Paul, Antigua and Barbuda

History
- Built: 1675

Historical Site of Antigua and Barbuda

Barter's is an official historic site in Saint Paul, Antigua and Barbuda. It was a sugar plantation established in 1675. The sugar mill tower continues to stand. 58 people were enslaved here in 1787.
