= Prison Farm, Antigua and Barbuda =

Coordinates: 17°8′18″N 61°50′37″W

Prison Farm
- Village
- Interactive map of Prison Farm
- Country: Antigua and Barbuda
- Parish: Saint John

Area
  - Total: 0.15 km^{2} (0.058 sq mi)

Population (2011)
  - Total: 566

Prison Farm is a village in Saint John, Antigua and Barbuda. It had a population of 566 people in 2011.

== Geography ==
According to the Antigua and Barbuda Statistics Division, the village had a total area of 0.15 square kilometres in 2011.

== Demographics ==
There were 566 people living in Prison Farm as of the 2011 census. The village was 92.98% African, 3.12% Hispanic, 1.56% other mixed, 1.56% other, 0.58% mixed black/white, and 0.19% not stated. The population was born in different countries, including 68.03% in Antigua and Barbuda, 8.97% in Jamaica, 5.46% in Dominica, and 5.46% in Guyana. The population had diverse religious affiliations, including 18.00% Anglican, 14.48% Pentecostal, and 10.57% Adventist.
