= Upper Lightfoot =

Coordinates: 17°5′35.41″N 61°48′19.94″W

- Village
- Country: Antigua and Barbuda
- Parish: Saint George

Area
  - Total: 0.8 km^{2} (0.31 sq mi)

Population (2011)
  - Total: 545

Upper Lightfoot is a village in Saint George, Antigua and Barbuda. It had a population of 545 in 2011.

== Geography ==
According to the Antigua and Barbuda Statistics Division, the village had a total area of 0.8 square kilometres.

== Demographics ==
There were 545 people living in Upper Lightfoot as of the 2011 census. The ethnic composition was: African (93.01%), East Indian (0.19%), mixed black/white (0.58%), other mixed (5.44%), Hispanic (0.39%), other (0.39%). The country of birth composition was: Antigua and Barbuda (72.43%), United States (5.24%), Guyana (4.66%), Jamaica (4.47%), Dominica (3.11%), with the remainder having been born in various other, mostly Caribbean countries. The three largest religious denominations were: Moravian (18.24%), Adventist (17.45%), and Anglican (13.53%), with an additional 0.59% being Rastafarian, and 2.16% irreligious.
