= Fitches Creek =

- Parish capital
- Interactive map of the Fitches Creek main place
- Coordinates: 17°7′21.43″N 61°47′30.59″W
- Country: Antigua and Barbuda
- Parish: Saint George
- Division: New North Sound

Population (2011)
  - Total: 532

Fitches Creek is an affluent coastal village in Antigua and Barbuda, located on the island of Antigua. It was named for the English surname Fitch, which may have been the family name of those who originally owned the surrounding land. It is located in the parish of Saint George.

== Demographics ==
The area is also an enumeration district, and statistical data for "Fitches Creek" is widely available. "Fitches Creek ED", or "ED 41800" has a population of 125, has a living condition index (unmet basic needs index) of 19.18, and an unemployment rate of 4.23.

Fitches Creek is "high-income", and has an income weight of 3.29 and 100% of households own computers (compared to 64.14% of households who have internet access). There are 112 households. 28.30% of residents aged 24 or older have tertiary education.

Q48 Ethnic	Counts	%
African descendent	369	69.38%
Caucasian/White	37	6.96%
East Indian/India	2	0.40%
Mixed (Black/White)	18	3.38%
Mixed (Other)	89	16.70%
Hispanic	4	0.80%
Syrian/Lebanese	1	0.20%
Other	6	1.19%
Don't know/Not stated	5	0.99%
Total	532	100.00%

Q58. Country of birth	Counts	%
Africa	1	0.20%
Other Latin or North American countries	6	1.19%
Antigua and Barbuda	348	65.41%
Other Caribbean countries	14	2.58%
Canada	13	2.39%
Other Asian countries	2	0.40%
Other European countries	2	0.40%
Dominica	8	1.59%
Guyana	21	3.98%
Jamaica	11	1.99%
Monsterrat	3	0.60%
St. Kitts and Nevis	4	0.80%
St. Lucia	4	0.80%
St. Vincent and the Grenadines	2	0.40%
Trinidad and Tobago	16	2.98%
United Kingdom	30	5.57%
USA	40	7.55%
USVI United States Virgin Islands	2	0.40%
Not Stated	4	0.80%
Total	532	100.00%

Q49 Religion	Counts	%
Adventist	39	7.40%
Anglican	155	29.20%
Baptist	22	4.20%
Church of God	1	0.20%
Evangelical	3	0.60%
Jehovah Witness	11	2.00%
Methodist	60	11.40%
Moravian	55	10.40%
Nazarene	12	2.20%
None/no religion	37	7.00%
Pentecostal	32	6.00%
Rastafarian	7	1.40%
Roman Catholic	62	11.80%
Wesleyan Holiness	6	1.20%
Other	13	2.40%
Don't know/Not stated	14	2.60%
Total	529	100.00%

== See also ==
- List of rivers of Antigua and Barbuda
