= Skerretts =

Coordinates: 17°7′21″N 61°49′12″W

- Village
- Interactive map of Skerretts
- Country: Antigua and Barbuda
- Parish: Saint John

Area
  - Total: 0.15 km^{2} (0.058 sq mi)

Population (2011)
  - Total: 481

Skerretts is a village in Saint John, Antigua and Barbuda. It is adjacent to the neighbourhood of Skerretts Pasture in St. John's, a separate area. Skerretts had a population of 481 people in 2011.

== Geography ==
According to the Antigua and Barbuda Statistics Division, the village had a total area of 0.15 square kilometres in 2011.

== Demographics ==
There were 481 people living in Skerretts as of the 2011 census. The village was 81.65% African, 5.73% Hispanic, 3.21% East Indian, 3.21% other mixed, 2.52% mixed black/white, 0.92% other, 0.23% white, 0.23% Syrian/Lebanese, 2.29% not stated. The population was born in different countries, including 62.84% in Antigua and Barbuda, 8.03% in Guyana, 6.88% in the Dominican Republic, 5.96% in Jamaica, and 5.05% in Dominica. The population had diverse religious affiliations, including 12.65% Anglican, 11.71% irreligious, 11.01% other, 10.54% Roman Catholic, and 10.07% Adventist.
