= New Winthropes =

New Winthorpes
- Village
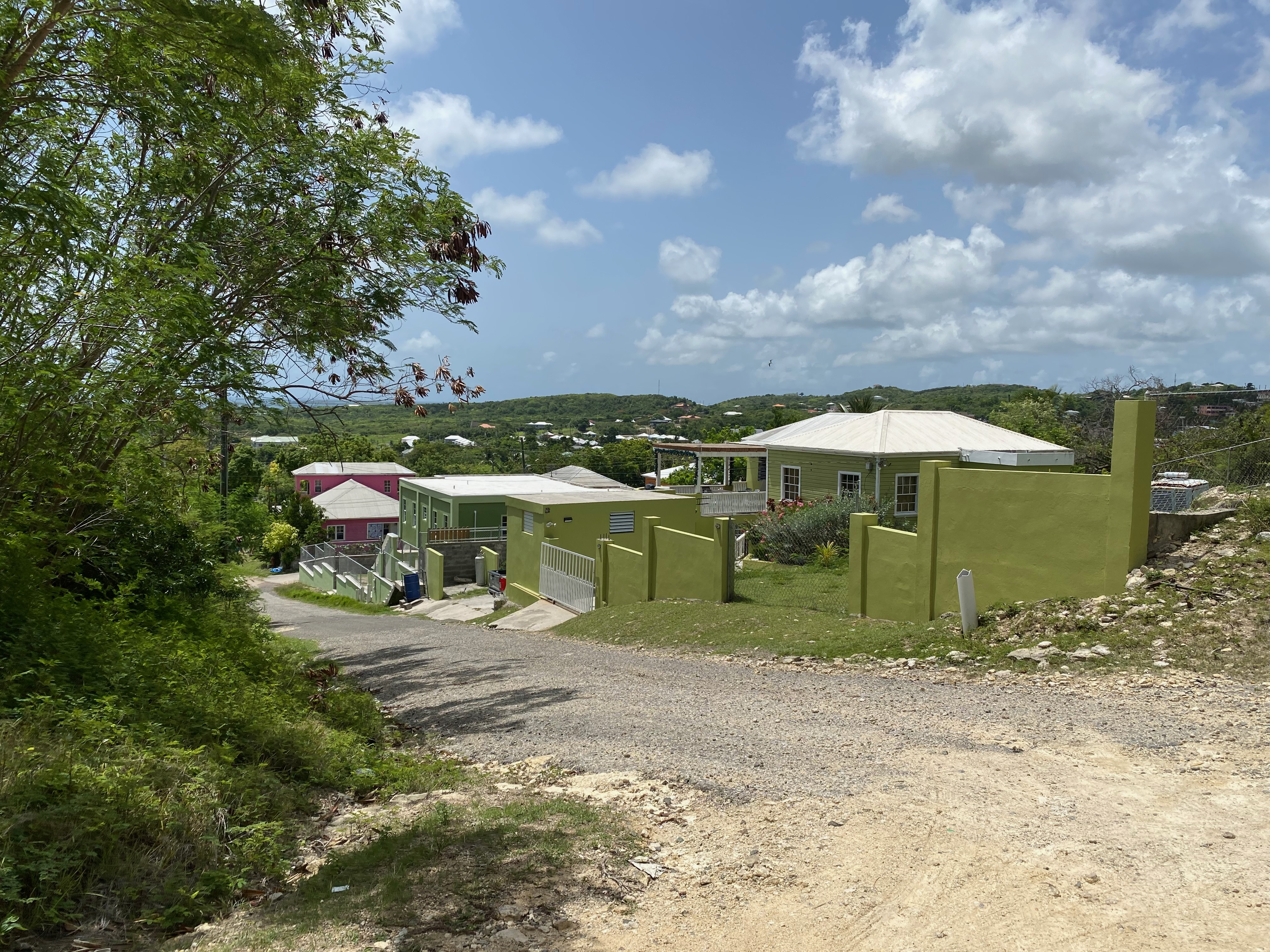
- New Winthorpes in June 2023
- Interactive map of the New Winthorpes main place
- Location in Antigua and Barbuda
- Coordinates: 17°8′53″N 61°48′47″W
- Country: Antigua and Barbuda
- Island: Antigua
- Civil parish: Saint George Parish

Government
  - Type: Village Council (possibly dissolved)

Population (2011)
  - Total: 1,266
- Time zone: UTC-4 (AST)

New Winthorpes is a village in Saint George Parish, Antigua and Barbuda.

== History ==
The original village of Winthropes was demolished for the construction of Coolidge International Airport. The original village was moved to where New Winthorpes is today.

The village has historically been a stronghold for the UPP.

== Demographics ==
New Winthorpes has three enumeration districts.

- 40100 NewWinthorpes-North
- 40200 NewWinthorpes-South
- 40300 NewWinthorpes-East

Ethnic
Q48 Ethnic	Counts	%
African descendent	1,204	95.15%
Caucasian/White	1	0.08%
East Indian/India	6	0.50%
Mixed (Black/White)	5	0.42%
Mixed (Other)	25	2.01%
Hispanic	3	0.25%
Syrian/Lebanese	6	0.50%
Other	5	0.42%
Don't know/Not stated	8	0.67%
Total	1,266	100.00%

Religion
Q49 Religion	Counts	%
Adventist	218	17.46%
Anglican	332	26.61%
Baptist	50	3.98%
Church of God	36	2.88%
Evangelical	12	0.93%
Jehovah Witness	24	1.95%
Methodist	32	2.54%
Moravian	68	5.42%
Nazarene	1	0.08%
None/no religion	44	3.56%
Pentecostal	124	9.92%
Rastafarian	8	0.68%
Roman Catholic	57	4.58%
Weslyan Holiness	143	11.44%
Other	53	4.24%
Don't know/Not stated	47	3.73%
Total	1,249	100.00%
NotApp :	17	

Country of birth
Q58. Country of birth	Counts	%
Africa	3	0.25%
Antigua and Barbuda	976	77.09%
Other Caribbean countries	12	0.92%
Canada	3	0.25%
Other Asian countries	3	0.25%
Dominica	43	3.43%
Dominican Republic	10	0.75%
Guyana	54	4.26%
Jamaica	42	3.34%
Monsterrat	15	1.17%
St. Kitts and Nevis	4	0.33%
St. Lucia	24	1.92%
St. Vincent and the Grenadines	7	0.59%
Syria	3	0.25%
Trinidad and Tobago	12	0.92%
United Kingdom	4	0.33%
USA	29	2.26%
USVI United States Virgin Islands	4	0.33%
Not Stated	17	1.34%
Total	1,266	100.00%

Country of Citizenship
Q71 Country of Citizenship 1	Counts	%
Antigua and Barbuda	1,101	86.96%
Other Caribbean countries	12	0.92%
Canada	2	0.17%
Other Asian and Middle Eastern countries	4	0.33%
Dominica	29	2.26%
Dominican Republic	7	0.59%
Guyana	29	2.26%
Jamaica	26	2.09%
Monsterrat	8	0.67%
St. Lucia	13	1.00%
St. Vincent and the Grenadines	3	0.25%
Trinidad and Tobago	5	0.42%
United Kingdom	3	0.25%
USA	8	0.67%
Other countries	3	0.25%
Not Stated	12	0.92%
Total	1,266	100.00%

Country of Second/Dual Citizenship
Q71 Country of Citizenship 2 (Country of Second/Dual Citizenship)	Counts	%
Other Caribbean countries	4	3.88%
Canada	8	7.77%
Dominica	12	10.68%
Dominican Republic	1	0.97%
Guyana	16	14.56%
Jamaica	7	6.80%
Monsterrat	4	3.88%
St. Lucia	8	7.77%
St. Vincent and the Grenadines	2	1.94%
Trinidad and Tobago	3	2.91%
United Kingdom	7	6.80%
USA	33	30.10%
Other countries	2	1.94%
Total	109	100.00%
NotApp :	1,157	
