= Ding-a-Dong-Nook =

- Ghost village
- Location within Antigua
- Coordinates: 17°00′52.9″N 61°48′41.3″W
- Country: Antigua and Barbuda
- Parish: Saint Paul
- Division: Rendezvous Bay

Population (1856)
  - Total: 18

Ding-a-Dong-Nook (also known as Ding-a-Ding-Nook) was a village in the Rendezvous Bay division of Saint Paul, Antigua and Barbuda, now located on the border of Saint Mary. The area is named after a local legend which states that during a Kalinago attack on Falmouth in 1640, governor Edward Warner's wife and children were kidnapped to the area. One of the children refused to quiet down and had their head smashed against a rock. The owner of the nearby Patterson's estate used to point out the purported rock to visitors. The village itself had a population of 18 as of the 1856 census– eleven women and seven men, in three homes. All had a freehold tenure. The nearby Rendezvous Bay Beach is sometimes referred to as Ding-a-Dong-Nook.
