= Renfrew, Antigua and Barbuda =

Coordinates: 17°5′11″N 61°48′25″W

Renfrew
- Village
- Interactive map of Renfrew
- Country: Antigua and Barbuda
- Parish: Saint George

Area
  - Total: 0.68 km^{2} (0.26 sq mi)

Population (2011)
  - Total: 370

Renfrew is a village in Saint George, Antigua and Barbuda. It had a population of 370 people in 2011.

== Geography ==
According to the Antigua and Barbuda Statistics Division, the village had a total area of 0.68 square kilometres in 2011.

== Demographics ==
There were 370 people living in Renfrew as of the 2011 census. The village was 87.43% African, 7.14% other mixed, 3.14% East Indian, 0.86% white, 0.57% mixed black/white, 0.57% Hispanic, and 0.29% not stated. The population was born in different countries, including 69.43% in Antigua and Barbuda, 6.57% in Dominica, 6.29% in Guyana, and 4.86% in Jamaica. The population had diverse religious affiliations, including 22.64% Anglican, 16.62% Moravian, 10.89% Roman Catholic, 6.88% Pentecostal, 6.59% Jehovah's Witness, and 6.59% not stated.
