= Barbuda-East =

Barbuda-East Baabyuuda-Ees
- Village and enumeration district
- Location within Antigua and Barbuda
- Coordinates: 17°37′44″N 61°45′16″W
- Country: Antigua and Barbuda
- Island: Barbuda
- Major Division: Rest of Barbuda

Population (2011)
  - Total: 306
- Time zone: UTC-4 (AST)

Barbuda-East (/bɑːbjuː.də iːst/; Barbudan Creole: Baabyuuda-Ees [bäːbjuː.də iːs]) is a village and enumeration district on the island of Barbuda.

== Demographics ==
Barbuda-East has one enumeration district, ED 90500.

Ethnic
Q48 Ethnic	Counts	%
African descendent	286	93.67%
Mixed (Black/White)	7	2.33%
Mixed (Other)	6	2.00%
Hispanic	5	1.67%
Other	1	0.33%
Total	306	100.00%

Religion
Q49 Religion	Counts	%
Adventist	29	9.36%
Anglican	37	12.04%
Baptist	37	12.04%
Church of God	2	0.67%
Jehovah Witness	7	2.34%
Methodist	3	1.00%
Moravian	1	0.33%
Nazarene	1	0.33%
None/no religion	13	4.35%
Pentecostal	124	40.80%
Rastafarian	7	2.34%
Roman Catholic	9	3.01%
Weslyan Holiness	33	10.70%
Other	1	0.33%
Don't know/Not stated	1	0.33%
Total	305	100.00%
NotApp :	1	

Health insurance
Q53 Insurance	Counts	%
Yes	183	60.00%
No	122	40.00%
Total	306	100.00%

Social security
Q54.1 Social Security	Counts	%
No	25	13.89%
Yes	158	86.11%
Total	183	100.00%
NotApp :	122	

Internet use
Q55 Internet Use	Counts	%
Yes	111	36.33%
No	188	61.67%
Don't know/Not stated	6	2.00%
Total	306	100.00%

Country of birth
Q58. Country of birth	Counts	%
Antigua and Barbuda	267	87.33%
Other Caribbean countries	4	1.33%
Canada	1	0.33%
Dominica	6	2.00%
Dominican Republic	5	1.67%
Guyana	10	3.33%
Jamaica	7	2.33%
United Kingdom	1	0.33%
USA	3	1.00%
Not Stated	1	0.33%
Total	306	100.00%

Country of citizenship
Q71 Country of Citizenship 1	Counts	%
Antigua and Barbuda	276	90.33%
Other Caribbean countries	4	1.33%
Dominica	4	1.33%
Dominican Republic	3	1.00%
Guyana	7	2.33%
Jamaica	7	2.33%
USA	3	1.00%
Not Stated	1	0.33%
Total	306	100.00%

Country of second/dual citizenship
Q71 Country of Citizenship 2 (Country of Second/Dual Citizenship)	Counts	%
Canada	4	19.05%
Dominica	3	14.29%
Dominican Republic	1	4.76%
Guyana	3	14.29%
United Kingdom	5	23.81%
USA	5	23.81%
Total	21	100.00%
NotApp :	284	

Lived overseas
Q61 Lived Overseas	Counts	%
Yes	34	12.60%
No	233	87.40%
Total	267	100.00%
NotApp :	39	

Business earning
Q91 Business Earning	Counts	%
Under $1,000 EC per month	3	17.65%
1,000 to $1,999 EC per month	3	17.65%
2,000 to $2,999 EC per month	2	11.76%
3,000 to $4,999 EC per month	4	23.53%
$5,000 EC and over per month	5	29.41%
Total	17	100.00%
NotApp :	288	
