= Piggotts Ville =

Coordinates: 17°7′50″N 61°49′52″W

- Village
- Interactive map of the Piggotts Ville main place
- Country: Antigua and Barbuda
- Parish: Saint John

Area
  - Total: 0.43 km^{2} (0.17 sq mi)

Population (2011)
  - Total: 370

Piggotts Ville is a village in Saint John, Antigua and Barbuda. It had a population of 370 people in 2011.

== Geography ==
According to the Antigua and Barbuda Statistics Division, the village had a total area of 0.43 square kilometres in 2011.

== Demographics ==
There were 370 people living in Piggotts Ville as of the 2011 census. The village was 75.22% African, 7.76% East Indian, 4.48% other mixed, 3.28% Hispanic, 2.99% white, 2.99% Syrian/Lebanese, 2.09% unknown, 0.90% other, and 0.30% mixed black/white. The population was born in different countries, including 50.45% in Antigua and Barbuda, 8.96% in Guyana, 7.76% in Jamaica, 7.46% in the United States, and 4.18% in "other Asian countries". The population had diverse religious affiliations, including 15.90% Pentecostal, 15.90% Catholic, and 11.62% Anglican.
