= Trade Winds, Antigua and Barbuda =

Coordinates: 17°9′17″N 61°50′45″W

Trade Winds
- Village
- Interactive map of the Trade Winds main place
- Country: Antigua and Barbuda
- Parish: Saint John

Area
  - Total: 0.32 km^{2} (0.12 sq mi)

Population (2011)
  - Total: 120

Trade Winds is a village in Saint John, Antigua and Barbuda. It had a population of 120 people in 2011.

== Geography ==
According to the Antigua and Barbuda Statistics Division, the village had a total area of 0.32 square kilometres in 2011.

== Demographics ==
There were 120 people living in Trade Winds as of the 2011 census. The village had a diverse ethnic composition, with 42.20% white, 28.44% black, 12.84% mixed black/white, 5.50% other mixed, 5.50% Syrian/Lebanese, 2.75% dn/ns, 1.83% East Indian, and 0.92% Hispanic. The population was born in different countries, including 33.03% in Antigua and Barbuda, 20.18% in the United Kingdom, and 10.09% in the United States. The population had diverse religious affiliations, including 38.32% Catholic and 25.23% Anglican.
