= Blue Waters, Antigua and Barbuda =

Blue Waters
- Village
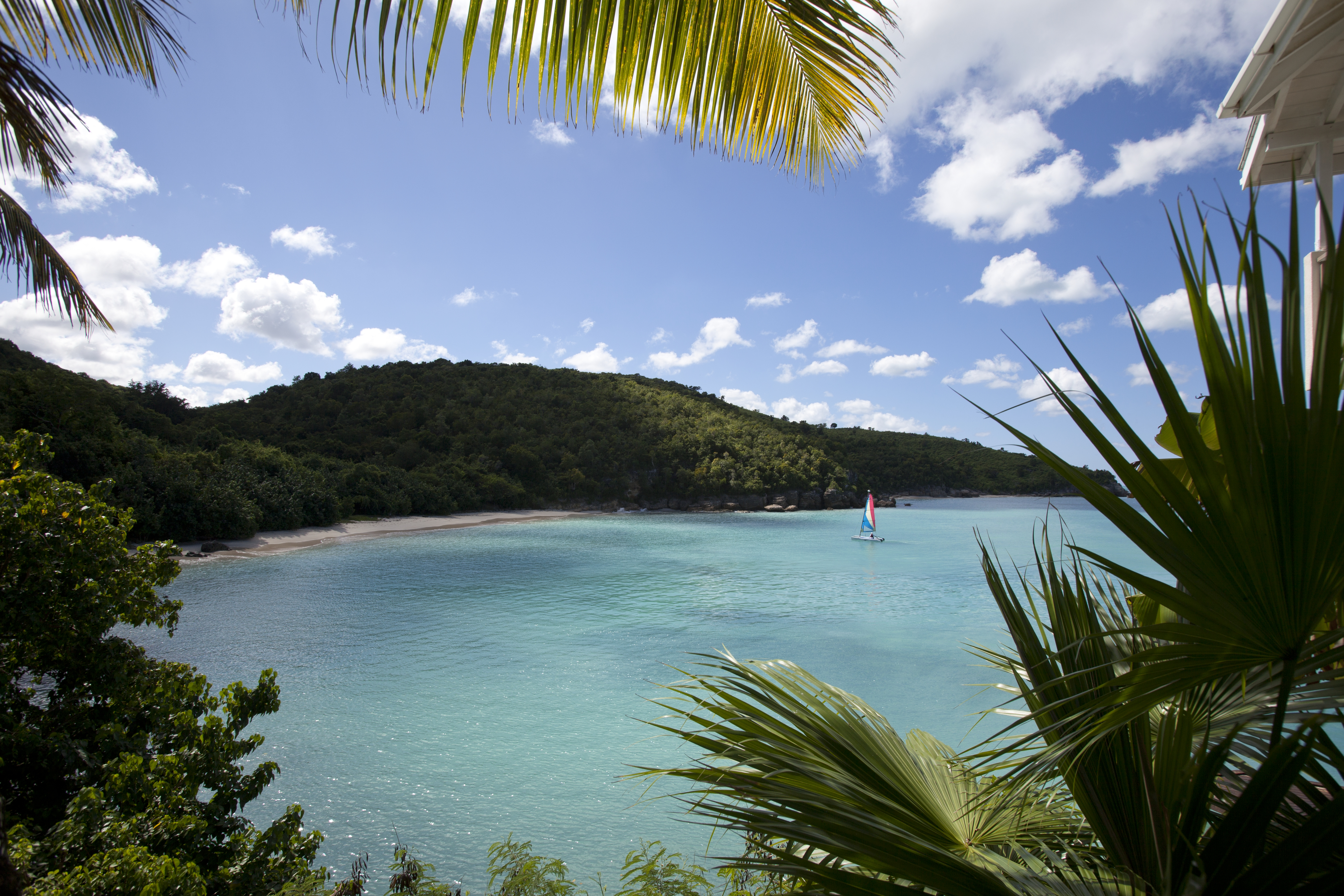
- View from the Blue Waters Hotel
- Interactive map of the Blue Waters main place
- Coordinates: 17°10′6.92″N 61°50′5.71″W
- Country: Antigua and Barbuda
- Island: Antigua
- Parish: Saint John

Government
  - MP: Charles Fernandez

Population (2011)
  - Total: 235
- Time zone: UTC-4 (AST)
- Closest airport: V.C. Bird International Airport
- Constituency: St. John's Rural North

Blue Waters is a village in Saint John Parish, Antigua and Barbuda.

== Demographics ==
Blue Waters has one enumeration district, 30600 Blue Waters.

Ethnic
Q48 Ethnic	Counts	%
African descendent	44	18.78%
Caucasian/White	66	28.17%
East Indian/India	15	6.57%
Mixed (Black/White)	1	0.47%
Mixed (Other)	36	15.49%
Hispanic	4	1.88%
Syrian/Lebanese	34	14.55%
Other	28	11.74%
Don't know/Not stated	6	2.35%
Total	235	100.00%

Religion
Q49 Religion	Counts	%
Adventist	2	0.94%
Anglican	24	10.33%
Methodist	15	6.57%
Moravian	6	2.35%
Nazarene	1	0.47%
None/no religion	19	7.98%
Pentecostal	9	3.76%
Roman Catholic	102	43.19%
Other	45	19.25%
Don't know/Not stated	12	5.16%
Total	235	100.00%

Country of birth
Q58. Country of birth	Counts	%
Other Latin or North American countries	1	0.47%
Antigua and Barbuda	56	23.94%
Other Caribbean countries	7	2.82%
Canada	7	2.82%
Other Asian countries	7	2.82%
Other European countries	17	7.04%
Dominica	2	0.94%
Dominican Republic	1	0.47%
Guyana	7	2.82%
Jamaica	8	3.29%
Monsterrat	4	1.88%
St. Kitts and Nevis	2	0.94%
St. Vincent and the Grenadines	7	2.82%
Syria	13	5.63%
Trinidad and Tobago	3	1.41%
United Kingdom	9	3.76%
USA	77	32.86%
USVI United States Virgin Islands	1	0.47%
Not Stated	7	2.82%
Total	235	100.00%

Country of citizenship
Q71 Country of Citizenship 1	Counts	%
Antigua and Barbuda	144	61.03%
Other Caribbean countries	3	1.41%
Canada	1	0.47%
Other Asian and Middle Eastern countries	3	1.41%
Monsterrat	1	0.47%
St. Vincent and the Grenadines	4	1.88%
United Kingdom	1	0.47%
USA	62	26.29%
Other countries	10	4.23%
Not Stated	6	2.35%
Total	235	100.00%

Country of second/dual citizenship
Q71 Country of Citizenship 2	Counts	%
Other Caribbean countries	4	4.71%
Canada	8	8.24%
Other Asian and Middle Eastern countries	12	12.94%
Dominica	1	1.18%
Guyana	6	5.88%
Jamaica	7	7.06%
Monsterrat	3	3.53%
St. Vincent and the Grenadines	2	2.35%
Trinidad and Tobago	2	2.35%
United Kingdom	12	12.94%
USA	27	28.24%
Other countries	10	10.59%
Total	94	100.00%
NotApp :	141	
