= Barnes Hill =

Coordinates: 17°8′32.50″N 61°48′29.02″W

Barnes Hill Baan Il
- Village
- Location in Antigua
- Country: Antigua and Barbuda
- Parish: Saint George

Area
  - Total: 0.51 km^{2} (0.20 sq mi)

Population (2011)
  - Total: 537

Barnes Hill (North Antiguan: Baan Il) is a village in Saint George, Antigua and Barbuda. It had a population of 537 in 2011.

== Geography ==
According to the Antigua and Barbuda Statistics Division, the village had a total area of 0.51 square kilometres.

The Barnes Hill Community Reservoir is a nature park centered around a former reservoir that once served the community.

== Demographics ==
There were 537 people living in Barnes Hill as of the 2011 census. The ethnicities in the village were: African (97.63%), white (0.20%), East Indian (0.20%), mixed black/white (0.59%), other (1.18%), and not stated (0.20%). The country of birth groups in the village were: Antigua and Barbuda (84.02%), Dominica (4.14%), and Jamaica (2.37%), the remainder were from various other, mostly Caribbean countries. The largest religious groups in the village were Anglican (43.79%), Adventist (10.26%), and irreligious (9.07%).
