= Parishes and dependencies of Antigua and Barbuda =

Parishes and Dependencies
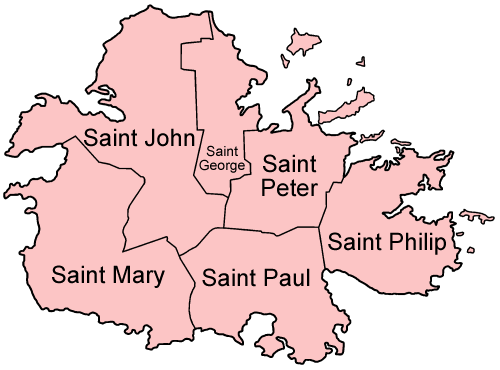
- Location: Antigua and Barbuda
- Number: 6 parishes, 2 dependencies
- Populations: 1,634 (Barbuda) - 51,737 (Saint John Parish)
- Areas: 24.41 sq.km (Saint George Parish) - 160.58 sq.km (Barbuda)
- Government: Vestry (1681–1873), parochial boards (created in 1873; active until 1900s)
- Subdivisions: Divisions

Antigua and Barbuda is an island nation made up of: Antigua island, which is divided into six parishes; and of the two dependencies of Barbuda island and Redonda island. (Note: Though Redonda is a dependency of Antigua and Barbuda, it is administered by Saint John)

Although Barbuda and Redonda are called dependencies, they are integral parts of the state, making them essentially administrative divisions. Dependency is simply their title. Redonda was annexed into Saint John and unlike Barbuda, is not an autonomous island, instead, it is a first-level administrative division subordinate to Saint John. Barbuda is sometimes referred to as the "parish of Holy Trinity" in relation to the parishes on Antigua in vital records and the education system.

== History ==
Antigua's first-level administrative divisions were based on Divisions, which were later joined to form the island's five parishes. Prior to the creation of parishes, Divisions served as the basis for Antigua's administrative divisions. Despite the fact that divisions have never been eliminated, they are very rarely mentioned.

On 24 August 1681, the five founding parishes of Antigua—Saint John, Saint Mary, Saint Paul, and Saint Philip and Saint Peter—were formally organised. In 1725, Saint Peter was divided into the Saint Peter as it is known today and Saint George.

The office of "justice" served as the top government official in parishes in the past; but, this role is no longer held in any parishes. Each parish also had a vestry. While formally abolished on 17 December 1873 by the Parochial Board Act of 1873, vestries met until as late as 1899. Vestries were elected at the parish church. The Parochial Board Act replaced vestries with parochial boards that were to be appointed by the governor. These boards had a chair who regulated their proceedings. The powers of these boards were inherited from those of the vestries. In 1878 the law was amended in relation to their taxation powers.

== List ==
| Parish or dependency | Capital | Largest city | Area (km^{2}) | Population (Census 2011) | Population density (km^{2}) |
|---|---|---|---|---|---|
| Saint George | Fitches Creek | Piggotts | 24.41 | 8,055 | 329.99 |
| Saint John | St. John's | | 66.96 | 51,737 | 772.66 |
| Saint Mary | Old Road | Bolans | 63.55 | 7,341 | 115.16 |
| Saint Paul | Falmouth | Liberta | 45.27 | 8,128 | 179.54 |
| Saint Peter | Parham | All Saints | 32.37 | 5,325 | 164.5 |
| Saint Philip | St. Philip's | Willikies | 40.67 | 3,347 | 82.3 |
| Barbuda | Codrington | | 160.58 | 1,634 | 10.18 |
| Redonda | N/A | | 1.50 | 0 | 0 |
| Total Country | St. John's | | 435.31 | 85,567 | 196.57 |

== Parish capitals ==
There are seven parish/dependency capitals in Antigua and Barbuda. One of these, St. John's, serves as the national seat of government. Each parish capital contains the parish church, while the capital of Barbuda contains the administrative offices of the Barbuda Council. Most capitals have town status, however, Codrington, St. Philip's, and Fitches Creek are villages, and St. John's is the sole city in the country.

With the exception of St. John's and Codrington, the majority of parish/dependency capitals are not the largest settlements in the parish. Parham is the second-largest city in Saint Peter; that being said, it would be the largest if the population of All Saints—which is spread across three parishes—were not included. Nonetheless, compared to Parham, the population of the sector of All Saints in Saint Peter is considerably higher.

| Parish/dependency | Capital | Capital population (2011) | Percentage of parish/dependency population living in capital | Foreign born population (%) | Status | Image | Ref(s) |
|---|---|---|---|---|---|---|---|
| Saint John | St. John's | 21,643 | 41.8% | 36.71% | City | | |
| Saint George | Fitches Creek | 532 | 6.6% | 34.07% | Village | | |
| Saint Peter | Parham | 1,307 | 24.5% | 18.86% | Town | | |
| Saint Philip | St. Philip's | 131 | 3.9% | 20.72% | Village | | |
| Saint Paul | Falmouth | 240 | 2.95% | 23.21% | Town | | |
| Saint Mary | Old Road | 1,251 | 17.04% | 9.27% | Town | | |
| Barbuda | Codrington | 796 | 48.7% | 11.54% | Village | | |
| Redonda | N/A | | | N/A | | | |

== See also ==
- ISO 3166-2:AG
- List of Caribbean First-level Subdivisions by Total Area
- Commonwealth Local Government Forum-Americas
- Divisions of Antigua
