= Education in Antigua and Barbuda =

Ministry of Education, Sport & Creative Industries
- Minister: Daryll Sylvester Matthew

General details
- Primary languages: English

Literacy (2022)
- Total: 99%
- Male: 98%
- Female: 99%

Education in Antigua and Barbuda is compulsory and free for children between the ages of 5 and 16 years. The system is modeled on the British educational system. The current Minister of Education, Sport & Creative Industries is Daryll Sylvester Matthew.

The adult literacy rate in Antigua and Barbuda is approximately 99%.

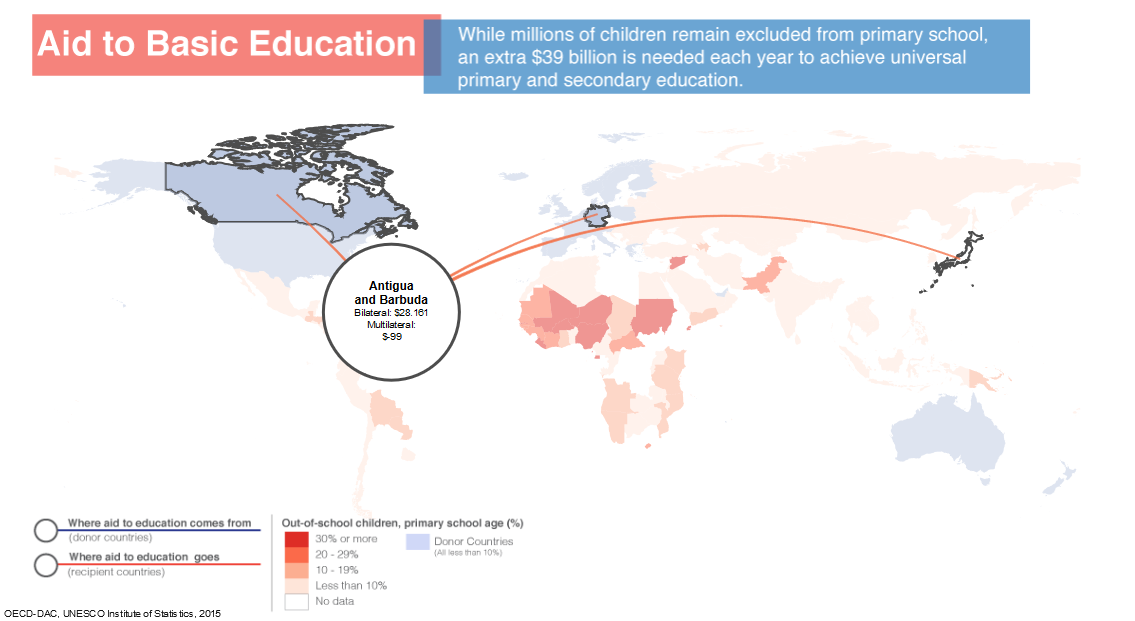
Aid to Basic Education, the amount of bilateral and multilateral aid contributed or received by Antigua and Barbuda (source:UNESCO)

== Primary and secondary education ==
Antigua and Barbuda has several primary and secondary schools, both government and private. In the 2013-2014 school year, 10,059 students were enrolled in a primary school, and 7,797 students were enrolled in secondary school.

The school year for primary and secondary schools begins in September and ends in June of the following year. In order to ensure that all costs related to schooling are covered by the government, there is an education levy on all basic wages in Antigua and Barbuda, with the funds used toward such costs as supplies, transportation, and school infrastructure maintenance.

== Higher education ==
In 1972, the technical and teacher's training colleges merged and formed the Antigua State College. Additional training options outside of university are offered at the Antigua and Barbuda Institute of Information Technology (ABIIT) and the Antigua and Barbuda Hospitality Training Institute (ABHTI).

In 2019, the University of the West Indies opened its fifth campus overall (and fourth physical campus) in Five Islands. The country was previously served solely by the University of the West Indies Open Campus. The government of Antigua and Barbuda contributes financially to the UWI.

The island of Antigua currently has three foreign-owned for-profit offshore medical schools: the University of Health Sciences Antigua (UHSA), founded in 1982; the American University of Antigua (AUA), founded in 2004; and the Metropolitan University College of Medicine (MUCM), founded in 2018. The island's medical schools cater mostly to foreign students but contribute to the local economy and health care.

Those interested in higher education also enroll at schools in the United States, Europe and Canada.

== Governance ==
=== Minister with responsibility for education ===
The Education Act of 2008 outlines the general goals and objectives that the Minister will set up and pursue. These include creating an excellent, diverse, and comprehensive educational system that is marked by excellence; promoting education for Antiguan and Barbudan citizens by establishing educational institutions to support the community's intellectual, physical, social, and cultural development; formulating an educational policy intended to carry out the Act's objectives; effectively implementing the Government's educational policy; and creating an integrated educational system that is structured in accordance with the Act. The Minister is in charge of overseeing the entire administration of the Education Act, and in the exercise of the authority granted to them, they may take any action that is practical or required to fulfill his duties. The Minister will also be in charge of creating an education system that, to the greatest extent possible, will guarantee that students' interests, aptitudes, and intellectual and vocational abilities are given adequate expression and opportunities for growth; establishing public schools and deciding where they should be located; creating, subject to the Act, provisions for student admission and transfer in public schools and assisted private schools; and creating, maintaining, or helping to establish and maintain educational institutions or other facilities for tertiary, adult, and continuing education as well as special education as the Minister deems necessary. The minister may make provisions for the professional training of teachers for the entire educational system and establish standards that apply to the recruitment of teachers, their training, professional development, and conditions of service; designate the grades or classes and special programs to be offered in public schools and assisted private schools; prescribe forms and notices as necessary for the administration of the Act; require attendance of persons of compulsory school age at schools established and conducted under the Act; form committees or other groups to periodically provide advice on problems pertaining to education; establish lists of textbooks and policies for all public schools and assisted private schools to guarantee adherence to national education standards; however, in the case of assisted private schools, the school's founding denomination will choose the textbooks for religious education; ascertain the extent of support provided to private schools and establish regulations about said support; create or dismantle public schools, including technical education institutions, and, if required, start or stop instruction there; establish curriculum for public schools and supported private schools in compliance with this Act; take care of any other issues or take other action that may occasionally be necessary to fulfill the Minister's obligations for training and education.

=== Director of Education ===
The general administration of the Act is handled by the Director of Education, in accordance with the Minister's directives. The Director of Education is responsible for overseeing the proper and efficient operation of schools and other educational institutions; creating administrative guidelines and protocols for enforcing general policies and managing the educational system; delegating authority to Ministry staff members for managing different facets of the educational system, such as private school registration and administration, after first consulting with the Permanent Secretary; developing and overseeing the training of all staff members; initiate curriculum innovation and reform and the establishment of suitable procedures for evaluating the curricula of schools and other educational institutions, subject to the provisions of the Act; advise the Minister on matters pertaining to education in the state; guarantee that school grounds, property, and supplies are safeguarded against inappropriate use; initiate, plan, and oversee induction and training programs for inexperienced teachers; make sure that the Act's provisions and any regulations made in response are followed with regard to the operation of schools and other educational institutions; and carry out any other Act-related duties that the Minister may from time to time designate to the Director of Education.

Any function, duty, or responsibility granted to the Minister by the Act or any regulations made under it may be assigned in writing by the Minister to the Director of Education; however, this does not prevent the Minister from carrying out any or all of the functions so assigned when the Minister deems it necessary. The Minister may, in an emergency, give general or special written directions to any public officer in the Ministry regarding the Minister's functions under this Act after consulting with the Permanent Secretary and the Director of Education. The public officer is then required to follow the Minister's instructions. If the Director of Education is mandated, authorized, or otherwise required to carry out any function by this Act or any enactment made under this Act, the Director of Education may, upon consultation with the Permanent Secretary, designate a public officer who will report to him or her to carry out the function.

== See also ==
- List of schools in Antigua and Barbuda
- List of universities in Antigua and Barbuda
- Youth in Antigua and Barbuda
