= Joanne C. Hillhouse =

Antiguan writer and journalist (born 1973)

- Born: 1973 (age 52–53); Ottos, St. John's, Antigua and Barbuda
- Education: Christ the King High School; Antigua State College; University of the West Indies
- Occupations: Writer, journalist and educator
- Awards: Anthony N. Sagba Award (Arts & Letters), 2023
- Website: jhohadli.wordpress.com

Joanne C. Hillhouse (born 1973) is a creative writer, journalist, producer and educator from Antigua and Barbuda. Her writing encompasses novels, short stories, poetry and children's books, and she has contributed to many publications in the Caribbean region as well as internationally, among them the anthologies Pepperpot (2014) and New Daughters of Africa (2019). Hillhouse's books include the poetry collection On Becoming (2003), the novellas The Boy from Willow Bend (2003) and Dancing Nude in the Moonlight (2004), the children's books Fish Outta Water and With Grace, the novel Oh Gad! (2012), and the young adult novel Musical Youth (2014), which was runner-up for the Burt Award for Caribbean Literature. She was named by Literary Hub as one of "10 Female Caribbean Authors You Should Know". An advocate for the development of the arts in Antigua and Barbuda, she founded the Wadadli Youth Pen Prize in 2004.

== Biography ==
=== Early years and education ===
Born to Ronald Hillhouse and Josephine John Hillhouse in Ottos, St. John's, Antigua, Joanne Hillhouse attended Holy Family School, Christ the King High School, and Antigua State College, before earning a degree in Mass Communications at the University of the West Indies (UWI), Mona Campus. She was mentored by Professor Mervyn Morris, who recommended her for the Caribbean Fiction Writer Summer Institute workshop held at the University of Miami, and led by Olive Senior. The experience Hillhouse gained interacting with other writers led her ultimately to produce her first novel.

=== Literary career ===
Elizabeth Nunez recommending Oh Gad! on NPR in 2014 commented on the fact that "So few Caribbean writers actually live and write in the region" – unlike Hillhouse: "There's such an authenticity to her story.... I immediately knew the people, the characters she wrote about." Hillhouse herself has said: "[W]hile I believe and hope my stories have universal appeal, the Antigua I write about is the Antigua I live and breathe every day, and I write it as we experience it, now."

In 2014, Hillhouse's young adult novel Musical Youth was published, becoming a finalist in the Burt Award for Caribbean Literature. As described by the Trinidad and Tobago Guardian: "Musical Youth is a compelling read because Hillhouse has managed to make readers really care about the characters and their struggles. It is a deserving, prize-winning book that now comfortably claims its place in Caribbean Young Adult literature."

Hillhouse's children’s picture book Lost! A Caribbean Sea Adventure, illustrated by Danielle Boodoo-Fortuné, was described by Kirkus Reviews as "an appealing book, all the more so for being based on real life".

Her writing – which as well as fiction and poetry encompasses reportage and features – has appeared widely in literary journals in the Caribbean region as well as internationally, including in The Caribbean Writer, PEN America, Essence, Writer's Digest, and Huffington Post, Calabash, MaComère, Small Axe. Caribbean Beat, Moko Magazine, Zing plus, The Columbia Review, Mythium, Tongues of the Ocean, POUi, WomanSpeak, A Journal of Literature and Art by Caribbean Women, and other outlets. She is also a contributor to the anthologies Pepperpot: Best New Stories from the Caribbean (2014) and New Daughters of Africa (edited by Margaret Busby, 2019).

Among literary events where Hillhouse has been a participant are the Caribbean Fiction Writers Summer Institute (University of Miami), Breadloaf Writers Conference, Texas A & M's Callaloo Writers Workshop, Calabash International Literary Festival in Jamaica, the Brooklyn Book Festival, Miami Book Fair, PEN World Voices Festival of International Literature, and the Sharjah International Book Fair, as well as the Antigua and Barbuda International Literary Festival, and other literary events in the Caribbean such as in Dominca and St. Martin.

In 2023, Hillhouse was awarded the Anthony N. Sabga Award (Arts & Letters).

=== Audio-visual work ===
Hillhouse has worked in local television and was associate producer of The Sweetest Mango (2001), Antigua's first feature-length film, and production manager on No Seed (2002).

=== Wadadli Youth Pen Prize ===
In 2004 Hillhouse founded the Wadadli Youth Pen Prize and its accompanying workshops for young writers, with the aim of nurturing and showcasing the literary arts in Antigua and Barbuda.

== Selected awards and recognition ==
- 2004: UNESCO Prize of Honour for contribution to the development of public reading and to the literature of Antigua and Barbuda.
- 2011: David Hough Literary Prize from the Caribbean Writer.
- 2011: JCI West Indies Outstanding Young Person Prize for Excellence, for commitment to Antigua and Barbudan society.
- 2014: Leonard Tim Hector Memorial Award, "for her perennial and exemplary contributions to the advancement of Antigua".
- 2020: Women of Wadadli Award for Literature received on International Women's Day.
- 2023: Anthony N. Sabga Award (Arts & Letters)

== Selected bibliography ==
- On Becoming (poetry), 2003
- The Boy from Willow Bend, Macmillan Caribbean, 2003; Hansib, 2009, ISBN 978-1906190293
- Dancing Nude in the Moonlight, Macmillan Caribbean, 2004; Insomniac Press, 2014
- Oh Gad!: A Novel (Zane Presents), Strebor/Atria/Simon & Schuster, 2012, ISBN 978-1593093914
- Musical Youth, Caribbean Reads Publishing, 2014; 2nd edition 2019, ISBN 978-1733829953
- Lost! A Caribbean Sea Adventure (illus. Danielle Boodoo-Fortuné), Caribbean Reads Publishing, 2017, ISBN 978-0999237236

== See also ==
- Caribbean literature
- Caribbean poetry
- Postcolonial literature
