= List of schools in Antigua and Barbuda =

This is a list of schools in Antigua and Barbuda.

== Government schools ==
=== Primary schools ===
- Bendals Primary School, Bendals
- Bethesda Primary School, Bethesda
- Bolans Primary School, Bolans
- Buckleys Primary School, Buckleys
- Cedar Grove Primary School, Cedar Grove
- Cobbs Cross Primary School, Cobbs Cross
- Five Islands Primary School, Five Islands
- Freemansville Primary School, Freemans
- Freetown Primary School, Freetown
- Golden Grove Primary School, Golden Grove
- Greenbay Primary School, Greenbay
- Holy Trinity Primary School, Codrington
- Jennings Primary School, Jennings
- John Hughes Primary School, John Hughes
- J.T. Ambrose Primary School, All Saints
- Liberta Primary School, Liberta
- Mary E. Pigott Primary School, St. John's
- New Winthorpes Primary School, New Winthorpes
- Newfield Primary School, Newfield
- Old Road Primary School, Old Road
- Pares Primary School, Pares
- Parham Primary School, Parham
- Pigotts Primary School, Pigotts
- Potters Primary School, Potters Village
- Sea View Farm Primary School, Sea View Farm
- T. N. Kirnon Primary School, St. John's
- Urlings Primary School, Urlings
- Villa Primary School, Villa
- Willikies Primary School, Willikies

=== Secondary schools ===
- All Saints Secondary School, All Saints
- Antigua Girls' High School, St. John's
- Antigua Grammar School, St. John's
- Clare Hall Secondary School, Clare Hall
- Glanvilles Secondary School, Glanvilles
- Irene B. Williams Secondary School, Swetes
- Jennings Secondary School, Jennings
- Ottos Comprehensive School, St. John's
- Pares Secondary School, Pares
- Princess Margaret Secondary School, St. John's
- Sir McChesney George Secondary School, Codrington
- Sir Novelle Richards Academy, Potters
- St. Mary's Secondary School, Bolans

=== Special schools ===
- Adele School, St. John's
- School for the Deaf, (located on the grounds of the T. N. Kirnon Primary School in St. John's)

== Private schools ==
=== Primary schools ===
- Sunny Side Turtorial School, Paynters
- Christian Faith Academy, St. John's
- Christian Union Academy, Clare Hall
- Foundation Mixed Primary School, St.John's
- Goodwill Preparatory School, St. John's
- Gospel Light Elementary School, Paynters
- Grace Christian Academy, St. John's
- Grays Crescent Primary School, Belmont
- Greensville Primary School, St. John's
- Island Academy International, Buckleys
- Kids Unlimited Primary School, Scotts Hill
- Minoah Magnet Academy, St. John's
- New Bethel SDA Academy, Liberta
- Post Millennial Academy, St. John's
- St. Andrews Junior School, St. John's
- St. John's Catholic Primary School, St. John's
- St. John's Lutheran School, Radio Range
- St. John's Temple Primary School, St. John's
- St. Michael's Primary School, Cassada Gardens
- St. Nicholas Primary School, St. John's
- St. Peters Academy, Belmont
- Sea View Academic Foundation, Scotts Hill
- Seventh Day Adventist School, St. John's

Grace Christian Academy, St. Johns Gambles

Sunnydale Primary School, St. John's

- Sunnyside Tutorial Primary School, Paynters
- T.O.R. Memorial Primary School, Paynters
- Wesleyan Junior Academy, St. John's
- Zion Primary School, St. John's

=== Secondary schools ===
- Christ the King High School, St. John's
- Christian Faith Academy, Golden Grove
- Island Academy International, Buckleys
- Premiere Secondary School, St. John's
- St. Joseph Academy, St. John's
- Seventh-day Adventist School, St. John's
- St. Anthony's Secondary School
- Baptist Academy of Antigua, Radio Range
- Devine Academy, St. John's
- Trinity Academy, Jennings

== See also ==
- Education in Antigua and Barbuda
- List of universities in Antigua and Barbuda
