= Rick James (actor) =

Antiguan actor (1939–2018)

- Born: George Emanuel James; 10 October 1939; St. John's, Antigua and Barbuda
- Died: 24 September 2018 (aged 78); St. John's, Antigua and Barbuda
- Occupations: Actor, politician, journalist, mas pioneer
- Years active: 1972 • 1981 (TV)
- Spouse: Rita Jansen (m. 1985; div. 1997)
- Children: 1

Rick James (10 October 1939 – 24 September 2018) was an Antiguan actor, politician, journalist and mas pioneer.

== Early life ==
He began his education at Moravian School and continued on to Princess Margaret School. Involved with the 1st Antigua Scout Troop Anglican, James first left his home country to attend the 8th World Scout Jamboree in 1955 as a Queen's Scout.

An amateur enthusiast, he entered the Carnival mas as a designer, presenting The Remnants of Rome at the first Summer Carnival in 1957. James went on to win Band of the Year in 1962 with Interplanetary Flag Wavers and again in 1963 with Atlantis Revellers, making him the first back to back winner of the prize.

1961 was an important year for James. Travelling to Trinidad, he represented Antigua at the Pan American Games in the 100-yard sprint. Now a Master Scout, he also attended the 2nd Caribbean Scout Jamboree.

== Acting ==
That same year, James secured a scholarship to study in the United States. Moving to San Francisco to pursue an acting career, he took up studies at an Adult High School. It was here that singer and actor Ricky Nelson saw one of his stage productions (or so he claimed), leading to the creation of his moniker. A subsequent move to Los Angeles saw him enrol in acting school, studying under the tutelage of James Doohan. Rick made his Hollywood debut in the West Coast Premiere of Blood Knot, produced and directed by Frank Silvera in 1965. Later that year he featured in The Respectful Prostitute at Le Grand Theater.

Moving to England in 1968, James resumed his career in the theatre, setting up the Obvi Theatre to showcase new talent. Having learnt stage production, he directed and appeared in double bills of stage plays, "Sack Race" (Mrs. Peacock and Sit Quietly on the Baulk) and '"Shack-Shack" (Sit Quietly on the Baulk and Shack-Shack), casting Chrissie Shrimpton in these productions and staging them at theatres including the West End.

Venturing into television work in 1972, James appeared in an episode of Dixon of Dock Green, two Play for Todays and Doctor Who (the 6-part serial The Mutants). The actor was even offered a bit part in a James Bond movie (possibly Live and Let Die) but ultimately turned it down, having auditioned for a more substantial role.

Realising that he was not being taken seriously as an actor, James decided on a different career path. By the mid-1970s, he became an operator for British Telecom, during which he became acquainted with a woman from Germany called Rita Jansen. They married in 1985 and the following year gave birth to a son, Sven.

A return to acting in the 1980s saw Rick appear in the penultimate episode of Blake's 7 entitled "Warlord" and various stage productions including Clouds by Michael Frayn at the Derby Playhouse (1980) and Detective Story at the Royal Exchange, Manchester (1982).

During these years, Rick wrote his first column for Tim Hector's Outlet Newspaper in Antigua about his experiences abroad, keeping in touch with his roots. Missing his homeland, James decided to move back there with his family in 1989.

== Politics ==
Returning home, the actor started his own theatre ensemble, playing short plays with small casts at beach hotels.

James hoped to improve lives in his home country. When away acting, it was to put Antigua on the map. When entering politics, it was to make a difference at home.

In August 1991, James founded the Free and Fair Elections League and served as its secretary up until his death. In 1999, he led the Antigua Freedom Party and contested the 1999 general elections but did not win the St. John's Rural East seat, losing to Lester Bird.

Over the years, he filed numerous election petitions in the High Court with his League conducting mock elections ahead of General Elections in his homeland.

== Death ==
On 18 September 2018, James checked himself into Mount St. John's Medical Centre, complaining of feeling unwell. He died less than a week later at 6 am on 24 September 2018, of multiple organ failure.
