= Piccadilly, Antigua and Barbuda =

Piccadilly
- Village
- Ruins in the Piccadilly area

- Location within Antigua
- Coordinates: 17°01′09″N 61°45′43″W
- Country: Antigua and Barbuda
- Parish: Saint Paul

Piccadilly (/ˌpɪkəˈdɪli/) is a residential area in Saint Paul, Antigua and Barbuda. The area is named after a former sugar estate established around 1780. The estate's windmill is destroyed.

Piccadilly was first owned by the Warner family before being transferred to Edward Byam, Godschall Johnson, and finally the Antigua Syndicate. The company used this area starting in 1945 as emergency provision grounds after a 1944 law authorised the establishment of a public pound on lands owned by William Meade. In a 1918 law, Road Nº40 was mentioned as passing through the village.

Today, the area contains residential developments, and the national government is working to increase local involvement in the area's real estate sector. Concrete roads are also being constructed in the area.

The place name spreads across Marsh Village, Cobbs Cross, and Dow Hill. Piccadilly is home to the University of Health Sciences.
