= Princess Margaret School =

Coordinates: 17.1264°N 61.8425°W

Location
- Hilda Davis Drive & Dickenson Bay Street; St. John's, Antigua and Barbuda

Information
- Type: Public
- Motto: "The World is in need of good men and women"
- Founded: 1955
- Authority: Ministry of Education
- Principal: Mrs. Rosa Ladoo-Roberts
- Average class size: 35
- Language: English
- Colours: Red, Blue, Yellow, Green
- Nickname: PMS
- Website: http://princessmgrt.abusstar.com/dyndex.php

Princess Margaret School (founded 1955) is a public secondary school in St. John's, Antigua. Its principal is Mrs. Rosa Ladoo-Roberts.

== History ==
Opening in 1955 by Princess Margaret, The Princess Margaret School was Antigua's first public secondary school.

== Notable alumni ==
- Gaston Browne, Prime Minister of Antigua
- Baldwin Spencer, Former Prime Minister of Antigua
- Cejhae Greene, Sprinter
- Miguel Francis, Sprinter
- Jamaica Kincaid, Writer, Poet
- Rick James, Actor and Politician/Activist
- Mervyn Richards, footballer and cricketer

== See also ==
- List of schools in Antigua and Barbuda
