= Darrick E. Antell =

American plastic surgeon

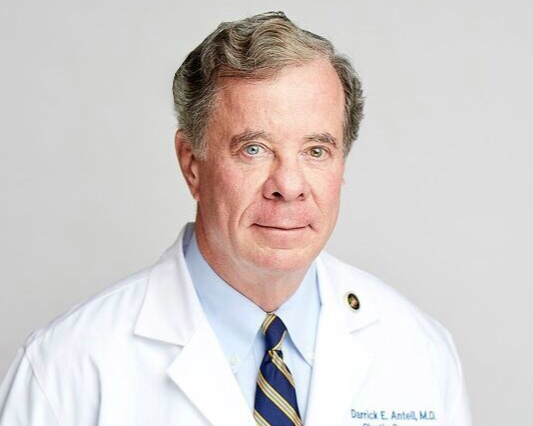
- Education: Stanford University Medical Center
- Occupations: Educator, researcher, plastic surgeon
- Employers: Icahn School of Medicine at Mount Sinai; American University of Antigua
- Known for: Plastic surgery, Reconstructive Surgery, Twins Research
- Awards: Fulbright Specialist Award

Darrick E. Antell, MD, F.A.C.S. is an American plastic and reconstructive surgeon, educator, and researcher. He is a diplomate of the American Board of Plastic Surgery and an official spokesperson for the American Society of Plastic Surgeons, and has served as an assistant clinical professor of surgery at Columbia University College of Physicians and Surgeons and the Icahn School of Medicine at Mount Sinai. Antell is known for his research using identical twins to study how environmental factors such as sun exposure, smoking, and stress influence facial aging, published in the journal Annals of Plastic Surgery and later featured in the Smithsonian Institution's exhibition "Genome: Unlocking Life's Code". He was awarded in 2025 as a Fulbright Specialist.

== Education and career ==
Antell received his B.S. in biology at Hobart College, a D.M.D. at Case Western Reserve University Dental School, and an M.D. at the University of Toledo.

He completed his general surgery training at Stanford University Medical Center and received his specialized training in plastic and reconstructive surgery at New York Hospital–Cornell Medical Center and Memorial Sloan-Kettering Cancer Center in New York City. From 1989 to 2014 he served as an assistant clinical professor of surgery at Columbia University College of Physicians and Surgeons.

Antell is a diplomate of the American Board of Plastic Surgery, a spokesperson for the American Society of Plastic Surgeons, and was appointed assistant clinical professor of surgery at the Icahn School of Medicine at Mount Sinai in 2014. In 1999, Antell was featured in a Los Angeles Times report on newer techniques in breast reconstruction for women undergoing mastectomy, describing approaches intended to improve cosmetic outcomes after cancer surgery.

=== Research ===
Antell's research has focused on the relative contributions of genetics and environment to facial aging. In a two-year study of identical twins, he photographed pairs of twins and correlated differences in their appearance with lifestyle factors including smoking, sun exposure, alcohol use, stress, diet, and exercise. By studying twins raised together, the work sought to hold genetics constant and isolate the effects of environmental exposures on skin texture, wrinkles, and other visible signs of aging.

The study, published in Annals of Plastic Surgery, received national media coverage, including a CBS News / Associated Press story on how "twins may age differently", which highlighted its implications for the role of nurture in the aging process.

Images from Antell's twin study were later included in the Smithsonian Institution's National Museum of Natural History exhibition "Genome: Unlocking Life's Code", which subsequently toured other museums in the United States.

=== Honors and awards ===
Partial list, current as of 2026:

- Selected Fulbright Specialist Award
- American Society of Plastic Surgeons (ASPS) Maliniac Award
- The Society of New York Office Based Surgery Facilities, President
- American Society of Plastic Surgeons
- American College of Surgeons – Fellow (F.A.C.S.)
- American Society for Aesthetic Plastic Surgery
- Lifetime member, the National Institute of Social Sciences
- New York Regional Society of Plastic and Reconstructive Surgeons
- American Medical Association
- Northeastern Society of Plastic Surgeons
- The International Society of Plastic Surgeons

== Philanthropy ==
Antell has served as a clinical faculty member and guest lecturer at the American University of Antigua College of Medicine, where he established a lecture series on plastic surgery beginning in 2010. He is a founding member and president of the Society of New York Office Based Surgery Facilities, a not-for-profit 501(c)(6) corporation that advocates for accreditation and regulation of office-based surgery facilities in New York State.

In 1997 he established the Dr. Darrick E. Antell '73 Scholarship at Hobart and William Smith Colleges, an endowed fund supporting students interested in medicine and community service, with preference for students from the Cleveland, Ohio, area. He also endowed the Darrick Antell, M.D. Medical Student Family Fund Scholarship at the University of Toledo College of Medicine and Life Sciences, awarded annually to a medical student with parental responsibilities.

== Media coverage ==
In 2000, CBS News reported on his study of identical twins, describing how the research suggested that lifestyle factors such as sun exposure and smoking can influence how twins age differently.

He has been quoted by ABC News and Good Morning America in coverage of trends in cosmetic surgery, including reports on rising numbers of men seeking plastic surgery and on an increase in chin augmentation procedures in the United States. A 2012 Reuters feature on chin implants cited Antell's New York practice in the context of national statistics showing rapid growth in the procedure. He has appeared in television segments such as NBC's Today show and CBS's Early Show, as well as being featured in consumer magazines including Vogue, Harper's Bazaar, and Town & Country.

== Publications ==
=== Peer reviewed ===
Partial list:

- Antell, Darrick E.; May, Jessica M.; Bonnano, Matthew J.; Lee, Norman Y. (June 2016). "A Comparison of the Full and Short-Scar Face-Lift Incision Techniques in Multiple Sets of Identical Twins". Plastic & Reconstructive Surgery. 137 (6): 1707–1714. doi:10.1097/PRS.0000000000002229. PMID 26890507. S2CID 43132460.
- Antell, Darrick E. (May 2016). "Stuart Brooks Kincaid, M.D., 1950 to 2015". Plastic & Reconstructive Surgery. 137 (5): 1657–1658. doi:10.1097/PRS.0000000000002073. S2CID 76608724.
- Antell, Darrick E.; Bonanno, Matthew J.; Lee, Norman Y. (November 2012). "Comparison of the Short and Full Incision Face Lift on Five Sets of Identical Twins". Plastic and Reconstructive Surgery. 130: 40–41. doi:10.1097/01.prs.0000421743.64460.9a.
- Antell, Darrick E.; Orseck, Michael J. (November 2007). "A Comparison of Face Lift Techniques in Eight Consecutive Sets of Identical Twins". Plastic and Reconstructive Surgery. 120 (6): 1667–1673. doi:10.1097/01.prs.0000288016.24950.20. PMID 18040204. S2CID 8901176.
- Antell, Darrick (April 2006). "Dr. John Milton Troxel, M.D., 1960 to 2005". Plastic and Reconstructive Surgery. 117 (4): 1372–1373. doi:10.1097/01.prs.0000215563.36011.6b.
- Antell, Darrick E.; Taczanowski, Eva M. (December 1999). "How Environment and Lifestyle Choices Influence the Aging Process". Annals of Plastic Surgery. 43 (6): 585–588. doi:10.1097/00000637-199912000-00001. PMID 10597816.
- Goulian, Dicran; Lesesne, Carroll B.; Antell, Darrick E. (July 1987). "Further Refinements on the Triangular Flap Closure of the Cleft Lip". Plastic and Reconstructive Surgery. 80 (1): 29–36. doi:10.1097/00006534-198707000-00005. PMID 3602158. S2CID 24307639.
- Antell, Darrick E.; Greenwald, Alfred E. (January 1987). "Legal Disclaimers". Plastic and Reconstructive Surgery. 79 (1): 146–147. doi:10.1097/00006534-198701000-00035. PMID 3797511.

=== Books ===
Contributing editor:

- Grabb and Smith's Plastic Surgery ISBN 1496388240
- Cosmetic Facial Surgery ISBN 0323795196
