= Kathleen Coard =

Grenadian pathologist and academic

Kathleen Coard CBE
- Born: Kathleen Cecile Maria Coard; 18 July 1952 (age 74); St. George's, Grenada
- Education: University of Bristol (BSc); University of the West Indies (BMBS, MD)
- Known for: Research in cardiovascular diseases, prostate cancer, and soft-tissue tumors
- Awards: Dan Hoyte Prize in Anatomy, Jamaica Medical Foundation Award for Outstanding Achievement in the Field of Pathology and Research, Anthony N Sabga Caribbean Awards for Excellence, Order of the British Empire
- Scientific career
- Fields: Medicine and pathology

Kathleen Cecile Maria Coard CBE (born 18 July 1952) is a Grenadian anatomic pathologist and academic, known for her research on cardiovascular diseases, prostate cancer, and soft tissue tumors. She is the first female professor of pathology in the Caribbean and has been recognized for her role in advancing health in Jamaica and the Caribbean.

== Biography ==
Coard was born in St. George's, Grenada, on 18 July 1952. She attended the St Joseph's Convent School in Grenada, where she completed her junior and secondary education. She earned a Bachelor of Science degree in anatomy from the University of Bristol, UK, in 1974. In 1978, she earned her Bachelor of Medicine, Bachelor of Surgery degree from the University of the West Indies (UWI) in Mona, Jamaica. In 1983, during her residency training in pathology, she obtained the WHO-PAHO Fellowship in Cardiovascular Pathology from the University of Western Ontario, Canada. In 1984, she graduated with a Doctor of Medicine degree in pathology from the University of West Indies, where she subsequently accepted a faculty position. The same year, she also obtained a Diploma from the Royal College of Pathologists.

In 1984, Coard became a lecturer in the Pathology Department of the UWI, as well as working as a consultant pathologist at the University Hospital of the West Indies. She also worked as a consultant pathologist to the General Hospital in St. Georges, Grenada, Cornwall Regional Hospital, and the Derriford Hospital in Plymouth, UK. From 1991 to 2003, she served as a senior lecturer at the UWI, and in 2003, she was appointed as Professor of Pathology. She is the first female professor of pathology in the Caribbean as well as the first female graduate of the university's Doctor of Medicine programme to be appointed to the post. She is known for her contribution to the enhancements in treatment of cardiovascular diseases, prostate cancer, and soft tissue tumors. She is specifically credited for her research on Jamaica and the Caribbean, that has been used for the treatment of major medical problems in the regions. For example, she conducted research on the genetic associations and potential risk factors for cancer in men of African descent, as well as on perinatal mortality in Jamaica.

In 2009, Coard was presented with the Jamaica Medical Foundation Award for Outstanding Achievement in the Field of Pathology and Research. In 2010, she was awarded the Anthony N Sabga Caribbean Award for Excellence, for her contributions to medical research. She was appointed as the Commander of the Most Excellent Order of the British Empire (CBE) in the 2010 Birthday Honours, for her services to medicine and to the community.

She is a founding member of the Caribbean Cardiac Society (CCS) and the Jamaican Association of Clinical Pathologists (JACP). She was the president of JACP from 2003 to 2005, as well as assistant secretary of the CSS from 2002. She is also a fellow of the American Society of Clinical Pathologists.

== Selected works ==
- Coard, Kathleen C. M.; Freeman, Vincent L. (2004). "Gleason Grading of Prostate Cancer: Level of Concordance Between Pathologists at the University Hospital of the West Indies". American Journal of Clinical Pathology. 122 (3): 373–376. doi:10.1309/MHCY35FJ296CLLC8. ISSN 1943-7722. PMID 15362366.
- Coard, Kathleen C. M.; Fletcher, Horace (2002). "Leiomyosarcoma of the Uterus with a Florid Intravascular Component ('Intravenous Leiomyosarcomatosis')". International Journal of Gynecological Pathology. 21 (2): 182–185. doi:10.1097/00004347-200204000-00012. ISSN 1538-7151. PMID 11917229.
- Coard, Kathleen C. M.; Desiree H-A., Skeete (2009). "A 6-year analysis of the clinicopathological profile of patients with prostate cancer at the University Hospital of the West Indies, Jamaica". BJU International. 103 (11): 1482–1486. doi:10.1111/j.1464-410X.2008.08265.x. ISSN 1464-410X. PMID 19076136. S2CID 23361056.
- Jackson, Maria; Tulloch-Reid, Marshall; Walker, Susan; McFarlane-Anderson, Norma; Bennett, Franklyn; Francis, Damian; Coard, Kathleen (2013). "Dietary Patterns as Predictors of Prostate Cancer in Jamaican Men". Nutrition and Cancer. 65 (3): 367–374. doi:10.1080/01635581.2013.757631. ISSN 0163-5581. PMID 23530635. S2CID 23623424.
- Heslop, Orville D.; Nyi Nyi, May-Phyo; Abbott, Sean P.; Rainford, Lois E.; Castle, Daphney M.; Coard, Kathleen (2011). "Disseminated Trichosporonosis in a Burn Patient: Meningitis and Cerebral Abscess Due to Trichosporon asahii". Journal of Clinical Microbiology. 49 (12): 4405–4408. doi:10.1128/JCM.05028-11. ISSN 0095-1137. PMC 3232981. PMID 22012010.
- Murphy, Adam B.; Ukoli, Flora; Freeman, Vincent; Bennett, Frankly; Aiken, William; Tulloch, Trevor; Coard, Kathleen; Angwafo, Fru; Kittles, Rick A. (2012). "8q24 risk alleles in West African and Caribbean men". The Prostate. 72 (12): 1366–1373. doi:10.1002/pros.22486. ISSN 1097-0045. PMC 3346887. PMID 22234922.
- Ritch, Chad R.; Morrison, Belinda F.; Hruby, Greg; Coard, Kathleen; Mayhew, Richard; Aiken, William; Benson, Mitchell C.; McKiernan, James M. (2012). "Pathological outcome and biochemical recurrence-free survival after radical prostatectomy in African-American, Afro-Caribbean (Jamaican) and Caucasian-American men: an international comparison". BJU International. 111 (4b): 186–190. doi:10.1111/j.1464-410X.2012.11540.x. ISSN 1464-410X. PMID 23107067. S2CID 9642597.
- Jackson, Maria; Walker, Susan P.; Simpson-Smith, Candace M.; Lindsay, Carole M.; Smith, Garret; McFarlane-Anderson, Norma; Bennett, Franklyn I.; Coard, Kathleen C. M.; Aiken, William D.; Tulloch, Trevor; Paul, Tomlin J.; Wan, Robert L. (2012). "Associations of whole-blood fatty acids and dietary intakes with prostate cancer in Jamaica". Cancer Causes & Control. 23 (1): 23–33. doi:10.1007/s10552-011-9850-4. ISSN 1573-7225. PMID 21984307. S2CID 15440505.
- Jackson, Maria; Tulloch-Reid, Marshall; Lindsay, Carole M.; Smith, Garret; McFarlane-Anderson, Norma; Bennett, Franklyn I.; Aiken, William D.; Coard, Kathleen C. M. (2015). "Both serum 25-hydroxyvitamin D and calcium levels may increase the risk of incident prostate cancer in Caribbean men of African ancestry". Cancer Medicine. 4 (6): 925–935. doi:10.1002/cam4.457. ISSN 2045-7634. PMC 4472215. PMID 25858172.
