= University of Health Sciences (Antigua) =

Nursing school in the Caribbean

Coordinates: 17°00′57″N 61°45′09″W

University of Health Sciences Antigua
- Motto: Deo et Patriae
- Motto in English: God and Country
- Type: For-profit
- Established: 1982
- President: Adedayo Akande, Ed.D., C.Dir.
- Provost: Manuel Flores, MD
- Location: Dow Hill, Antigua
- Colors: Maroon
- Website: www.uhsa.ag

The University of Health Sciences Antigua (UHSA) is a private, for-profit medical and nursing school located in Dow Hill and Piccadilly near Falmouth, Antigua, in the Caribbean. UHSA confers upon its graduates the Doctor of Medicine (MD) and Bachelor of Science in Nursing degree.

== History ==
UHSA was established in 1982 and began instruction in 1983. The Dow's Hill campus is located about 12 miles (19 km) from the capital city of St. John's. Formerly a NASA tracking station, the university is located on a 50-acre (200,000 m^{2}) area within the Historical National Park area of English Harbour.

== Doctor of Medicine curriculum ==
The Doctor of Medicine program at UHSA is a four-year course of study that consists of two semesters per calendar year. Semesters 1-4 are Basic sciences semesters that are completed at the university's Antigua campus. The remainder of the program consists of Clinical Clerkships at affiliated hospitals in the United States, Canada, Puerto Rico, the United Kingdom, and Pakistan.

== Government recognition ==
UHSA is recognized by the Government of Antigua and Barbuda. Because of this recognition, the university is listed in the FAIMER International Medical Education Directory (IMED).

== Licensure restrictions ==
In the United States, the medical boards of the following states have listed UHSA as an institution whose graduates are ineligible for licensure:

- California
- Indiana
- Kansas
- North Dakota

== See also ==
- International medical graduate
- List of medical schools in the Caribbean
- List of universities in Antigua and Barbuda
