= Anthony N Sabga Caribbean Awards for Excellence =

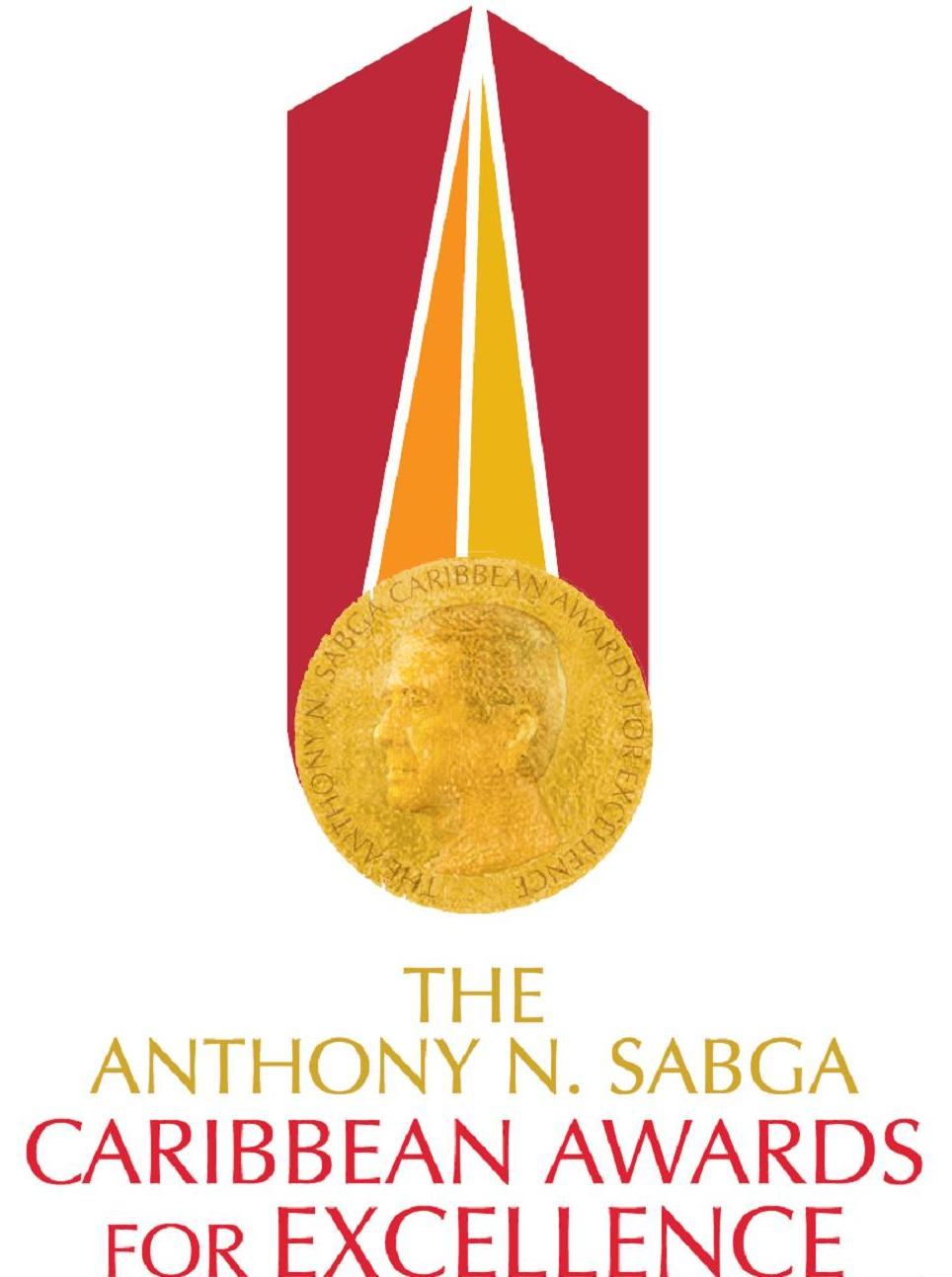
The Logo of the Anthony N Sabga Caribbean Awards for Excellence

The Anthony N Sabga Caribbean Awards for Excellence were initiated by the Syrian-born Anthony N. Sabga, one of the Caribbean's most celebrated entrepreneurs and founder and chairman emeritus of the ANSA McAL Group of Companies in the Republic of Trinidad and Tobago.

The awards are meant to recognise and reward excellence in the Caribbean region, and create an awareness of the significant work done in the region that benefits Caribbean people, and all people worldwide. The Sabga Awards programme is the only institution of its kind in the Caribbean. Launched in 2005, prizes are awarded in the spheres of Arts & Letters, Science & Technology, and Public & Civic Contributions. The first laureates were named in 2006, and were presented with a cash prize of (TT)$500,000 (US$83,000), a gold medal, and a citation. Since 2006, three sets of laureates have been honoured at ceremonies in Trinidad.

== The laureates ==
- Robert Yao Ramesar, filmmaker (Arts & Letters, Trinidad and Tobago, 2006)
- Prof Terrence Forrester, Scientist (Science & Technology, Jamaica, 2006)
- Fr Gregory Ramkissoon, Priest and Community Activist (Public & Civic Contributions, Jamaica, 2006)
- Prof David Dabydeen, poet, novelist and Academic from University of Warwick (Arts & Letters, Guyana, 2008)
- Mr James Husbands, entrepreneur (Science & Technology, Barbados, 2008)
- Mrs Claudette Richardson-Pious, community activist (Joint Laureate) (Public & Civic Contributions, Jamaica, 2008)
- Ms Annette Arjoon community activist (Joint Laureate) (Public & Civic Contributions, Guyana, 2008)
- Adrian Augier, poet, playwright (Arts & Letters, St Lucia, 2010)
- Prof Kathleen Coard, Pathologist (Science & Technology, Grenada, 2010)
- Sydney Allicock Environmental and Community Activist (Public & Civic Contributions, Guyana, 2010)
- Dr Lennox Honychurch, historian (Public and Civic Contributions, Dominica, 2011)
- Dr Kim Johnson (Arts and Letters, Trinidad and Tobago, 2011)
- Professor Surujpal Teelucksingh (Science and Technology, 2011)
- Dr Caryl Phillips (Arts and Letters, St Kitts, 2013)
- Dr Adesh Sirjusingh (Public & Civic Contributions, Trinidad and Tobago, 2023)
- Joanne C. Hillhouse (Arts & Letters, Antigua and Barbuda, 2023)
- Dr Mahendra Persaud (Science & Technology, Guyana, 2023)

== Selection of laureates ==
The laureates are selected by Country Nominating Committees (CNC) and a regional Eminent Persons Panel (EPP). Advertisements are placed in the media throughout the English-speaking Caribbean stating criteria and inviting nominations. Applications are passed to the nominating committees in five countries: Guyana, Trinidad & Tobago, Barbados, Jamaica, and the Organisation of Eastern Caribbean States (OECS). Each CNC then makes its selections, and the candidates are subjected to a rigorous research and vetting procedure. Once candidates are found to meet the criteria, the CNCs make selections and present them to the EPP, which makes the final adjudication. Announcements are then made via press conference to regional media, such as the Trinidad Guardian, the St Lucia Voice, and the Stabroek News in Guyana.

The awards are then made at a ceremony in Trinidad. The awards have been biennial since 2006, but at the 2010 ceremony held on April 17, 2010 at the Hilton, Trinidad, Sabga announced that the awards would henceforth be made yearly.
