= Antigua Caribbean Liberation Movement =

- Leader: Tim Hector
- Founded: 1968
- Dissolved: 1992
- Newspaper: Outlet
- Ideology: Socialism; Pan-Africanism
- Political position: Left-wing

Antigua Caribbean Liberation Movement was a radical socialist and Pan-African political party in Antigua and Barbuda. ACLM was founded in 1968 by Tim Hector, the then chairman of the Progressive Labour Movement. The ideological inspiration for ACLM came from C.L.R. James.

== Ideology ==
ACLM had close contacts with Communist Party of Cuba and other leftist groups in the regions such as the New Jewel Movement of Grenada and favoured the creation of a Caribbean Union. The party also supported anti-Apartheid struggles in South Africa and organised African Liberation Day celebrations in Antigua.

== Electoral strength ==
In the 1980, elections, ACLM won no seats and its electoral strength never advanced much further.

== Merger and dissolution ==
UPP was formed in 1992, through a merger of ACLM, the Progressive Labour Movement and the United National Democratic Party. In February 2002, former ACLM and UPP member Alister Thomas announced that he had formed a new party, National Movement for Change.
