= Danielle Boodoo-Fortuné =

Trinidadian poet and illustrator (born 1986)

- Born: 1986 (age 39–40); Saint Joseph, Trinidad and Tobago
- Education: University of the West Indies, Augustine campus
- Occupations: Poet, illustrator
- Writing career
- Language: English language
- Notable work: Doe Songs

Danielle Boodoo-Fortune (born 1986) is a poet, illustrator, visual artist and teacher based in Trinidad and Tobago. She is the current Poet Laureate of Trinidad and Tobago. Her first collection of poems, Doe Songs, published by Peepal Tree Press in 2018, was awarded the OCM Poetry Prize in 2019. Danielle was also shortlisted for the Montreal Poetry Prize in 2020. Her work has been published in numerous journals and anthologies.

Danielle has exhibited her mixed media paintings in Trinidad and Tobago, as well as group shows internationally. She has worked as an illustrator for Caribbean Reads Publishers, Red Leaf Press, Hay House and Harper Collins UK. She is the illustrator of the Earthcraft Oracle (Hay House, 2021) and The Moon Goddess Shadow Deck, forthcoming from Hay House in 2027.

== Life ==
Danielle Boodoo-Fortuné was born in 1986 in Saint Joseph, Trinidad and Tobago. She is based in Sangre Grande, where her creative studio is located, and holds a degree in English literature from the University of the West Indies. Danielle is an alumna of the Cropper Foundation Caribbean Writers' Residential Workshop

Danielle often cites Trinidadian poet Dr Jennifer Rahim as one of her early mentors. She lives with her husband and two sons.

== Career ==
She is regularly invited to participate in the Bocas Lit Fest with fellow poets Vahni Capildeo, Celia Sorhaindo and Opal Palmer Adisa. In 2021, she became a jury member for the Bocas Prize for Poetry.

In 2017, she was considered "one of the most in-demand local artists" by the Trinidad Daily Express. Her poems are regularly published in literary journals such as Small Axe Journal, Room Magazine, Cordite Poetry Review, The Literary Review and Poetry London.

=== Exhibitions ===
- 2013 : Horizons Art Gallery (Trinidad and Tobago) with Katrina Inglis
- 2013 : « Criatura », Art Society Gallery (Trinidad and Tobago)
- 2016 : Saint Francis College Gallery with Jacqueline Bishop, Laura James, Iyaba Mandingo, Michele Voltaire Marcelin, Opal Palmer Adisa and Mervyn Taylor

=== Books ===
- Coming Up Hot: Eight New Poets from the Caribbean, Peekash Press (2015) ISBN 9781845233099
- as illustrator : Lost! A Caribbean Sea Adventure by Joanne C. Hillhouse (2017) ISBN 978-0999237212
- Doe Songs (2018) ISBN 978-1845234188
- The Sea Needs No Ornament, eds. Loretta Collins Klobah (2020) ISBN 9781845234737
- as illustrator : The Jungle Outside by Joanne C. Hillhouse (2021) ISBN 978-0008509170

== Art ==
=== Poetry ===
Boodoo-Fortuné writes about family love, parent-child relationships and childhood trauma. Doe Songs was described as "an intergenerational web of women stories". In her poetry, women's love is sometimes cruel and destructive, but can become a source of comfort.

She compares women's condition in society to the current destruction of the environment, which is an ecofeminist theme. Her descriptions of Trinidad's luscious landscapes avoid exoticism: according to Yvonne Reddick, the wilderness in Boodoo-Fortuné's poetry is unsettling and "barely Christianised".

She writes in free verse in a surrealist style. She frequently uses animal imagery to convey themes of mythological transformation. Her poetry is inspired by Pascale Petit and Derek Walcott.

=== Illustration ===
Danielle Boodoo-Fortuné is also a painter. She mainly uses watercolours and acrylic paint to represent women.

She regularly incorporates poetry verse in her illustrations.

== Awards ==
- 2009 : Charlotte and Isidor Paiewonsky Prize from The Caribbean Writer journal
- 2012 : Small Axe Poetry Prize
- 2015 : Hollick Arvon Caribbean Writers Prize from Bocas Lit Festival
- 2016 : Wasafiri New Writing Prize for Poetry
- 2019 : Bocas Prize for Poetry

== See also ==
- Kei Miller
- Claudia Rankine
- Kaie Kellough
