= Dow Hill (mountain) =

Mountain in Antigua and Barbuda

- Location within Antigua and Barbuda

Highest point
- Elevation: 79 m (259 ft)
- Prominence: 49 m (161 ft)
- Coordinates: 17°01′11.44″N 61°45′16.75″W

Geography
- Location: Antigua and Barbuda

Dow Hill is a peak in Saint Paul, Antigua and Barbuda. The village of Dow Hill is named after it. It has an elevation of 79 m (259 ft) and a prominence of 49 m (161 ft).
