= Outlet (Antigua newspaper) =

Former Antiguan radical newspaper

The Outlet
- Cover of Outlet
- Type: Bi-weekly newspaper
- Editor: Tim Hector, James Knight
- Founded: 1968
- Political alignment: Antigua Caribbean Liberation Movement
- Headquarters: Saint John's, Antigua and Barbuda
- City: Saint John's
- Country: Antigua and Barbuda
- Circulation: 5,000

The Outlet was a radical newspaper published in Saint John's, Antigua and Barbuda. The Outlet was founded in 1968. The newspaper was edited by Tim Hector and James Knight. It functioned as a weekly organ of the Antigua Caribbean Liberation Movement (ACLM). For the ACLM the newspaper played a very important role. In its heyday Outlet claimed a circulation of around 5,000 copies, thus being the most widely read newspaper on Antigua. As of the early 1970s, Outlet and Standard (which appeared on an irregular basis) were the sole opposition newspapers in the country.

The Outlet was outspoken against corruption in the country. It argued that the Vere Bird government was guilty of lax control of casino businesses, peddling passports to non-Antiguans, mismanaging foreign loans, and using Antigua and Barbuda to launder arms shipments to South Africa. Due to its criticisms, Outlet was often targeted by the government.

In June 1978 Antigua Printing and Publishing Company ceased to print Outlet. The company claimed that the decision was motivated by fears that Outlet risked a libel lawsuit.

In 1982 Outlet was pressured by the government to apply for a surety bond, following fresh criticism of government corruption in its articles. Then on 23 July 1982 around twenty police officers raided the Outlet office, seizing documents and mailing lists of subscribers. The police claimed that the seized materials were secret government documents and that the publishers would be charged under the Official Secrets Act (it later turned out that the documents were publications of UNESCO and documents from Barbados about the Space Research Corporation). The Commissioner of Police Edric Potter declared that publishing of Outlet would be banned as of 31 July 1982. On 26 July 1982, a break-in at the office occurred, and equipment worth 8,000 East Caribbean dollars was stolen. Copies of the 21 August 1982 issue of Outlet were seized by police. These events prompted the newspaper to bring the government in front of the High Court, charging it with trying to deny the newspaper its "constitutional right" to publish. On 4 September 1982, the High Court ruled that Outlet was a legitimate newspaper with the constitutional right to be published.

In 1984 accusations of corruption and maladministration published by ACLM pressured the government to call fresh elections. In May 1985 Hector was charged with spreading 'false statements' about the government and the Commissioner of Police. In 1990 the Privy Council found the charges unconstitutional.

The office of the newspaper was targeted by arsonists, following a November 1998 article in Outlet charging the government with secretly having imported weaponry for half a million dollars. The attack on Outlet would affect the campaign ahead of the 1999 general election.

As of the early 2000s, the newspaper was published on Tuesdays and Thursdays.
