= Seymour I. Schwartz =

American surgeon

Seymour I. Schwartz (January 22, 1928 – August 28, 2020) was the Distinguished Alumni Professor for the Department of Surgery at the University of Rochester in Rochester, New York. He was the founding editor-in-chief of Schwartz's Principles of Surgery, chairman of the Department of Surgery at the University of Rochester (1987–1998), editor-in-chief of the Journal of the American College of Surgeons (1996–2004) and president of the American College of Surgeons (1997–1998). He performed general, vascular, cardiothoracic and pediatric surgery, and was recognized for his impact on the field of liver surgery.

With nearly 65 years in the field of surgery, Scwartz published hundreds of research articles, textbook chapters, received numerous honors in the United States and abroad, and lectured throughout the world as a visiting professor

Schwartz authored many books on the history of surgery, including Gifted Hands: America's Most Significant Contributions to Surgery, Holystic Medicine – The Patron Saints of Medicine, and The Anatomist, The Barber-Surgeon and the King. What began initially as a hobby, led to significant accomplishments and contributions in the field of cartography. His cartographic publications include The Mapping of America, This Land is Your Land: The Geographic Evolution of the United States, Mis-Mapping of America, and Putting "America" on the Map. He served on the board of trustees for the National Museum of American History of the Smithsonian Institution, as well as the Advisory Board for the Geography and Map Division of the Library of Congress. In 2001, he was elected to membership in the American Philosophical Society.

== Early life ==
Seymour Schwartz, M.D., F.A.C.S was born on January 22, 1928, in the Bronx, New York, New York. His father, Samuel Schwartz, MD, was a Russian Jew who emigrated to the United States at the age of four. He worked as a physician and anatomy instructor at the Polyclinic Hospital in Manhattan, New York, New York, and served as a Captain in the Army Medical Corps during World War II. His mother, Martha Schwartz (née Yampolsky), was a homemaker and secretary during World War II. Schwartz attended DeWitt Clinton High School in the North Bronx, graduating in 1944. He was accepted into Yale but lacked the funds to attend. He enrolled in the University of Wisconsin with a full scholarship and successfully completed his undergraduate studies in just two years before enrolling in medical school in 1946.

While at Wisconsin, he obtained a research position in the laboratory of Dr. Joseph Lalich, Professor of Pathology, investigating renal disorders. This was his introduction to scientific research. It was also during college that he met his future wife, Ruth Elaine Schwartz (née Wainer). They would go on to have three sons: Richard Earl Schwartz, Aviation Operations Director, Enterprise; Kenneth Schwartz (FAIA Fellow American Institute of Architecture) Favrot Professor and Dean Tulane School of Architecture, Michael Sacks Chair in Civic Engagement and Social Engagement, Director, Phyllis Taylor Center for Social Innovation and Design Thinking; David Schwartz, Associate Professor of Cardiology Washington University School of Medicine, St. Louis, Missouri.

Ruth Schwartz, M.D., attended Wisconsin Medical School and later completed her residency training in obstetrics and gynecology (OB/Gyn) at Genesee Hospital in Rochester, New York. She served as Secretary of the American College of Obstetrics and Gynecology and as Chief of Obstetrics and Gynecology at Genesee Hospital. Ruth and Seymour Schwartz were married for fifty years, until her death in 1999.

Schwartz matriculated at Syracuse University College of Medicine in 1946, where he continued his research endeavors in the lab of renal physiologist and Chair of the Department of Physiology, Dr. Robert Pitts. Dr. Pitts eventually accepted a chairman position at Cornell University and offered to arrange for Schwartz to transfer to the New York University School of Medicine where he could continue his studies of renal disorders with renal physiologist, Homer Smith. Schwartz accepted this transfer and graduated from NYU with his medical degree in 1950 with election to the Medical Honor Society, Alpha Omega Alpha.

== Surgical training and service in the United States Navy ==
After earning their medical degrees, Ruth and Seymour were challenged with finding residency programs in an era before the existence of the National Residency Matching Program, and at a time when residency programs prohibited married couples from training at the same hospital. The couple was eventually offered residency positions in both Minnesota and New York. After weighing the pros and cons, but more importantly, a coin toss, they decided to move to New York. They accepted residency positions at local hospitals in Rochester, New York, and went on to complete their training at Strong Memorial Hospital and Genesee Hospital, respectively.

In 1950, Seymour Schwartz began a one-year internship in surgery at the University of Rochester in Rochester, New York. At the time this was a pyramidal program, with 10 interns competing for two residency positions. He began his surgical internship with an interest in neurosurgery, but following a disagreeable interaction with the Chief of Neurosurgery, Dr. Van Waggenen, elected to pursue other interests. As an intern, Schwartz called Dr. Van Waggenen around 10:00 one evening to clarify an order on one of his patients. Schwartz stated that the following morning, Dr. Van Waggenen "verbally lacerated me for having the effrontery to call a professor in the middle of the night rather than contacting his chief resident." Following this unpleasant interaction, Schwartz decided to pursue a career in general surgery.

Upon successful completion of his internship, he matriculated as an assistant resident in surgery at Strong Memorial Hospital. In 1951, as a consequence of the doctors' draft enacted during the Korean War, Schwartz joined the United States Navy, leaving Rochester as Lieutenant Junior Grade. He would serve aboard the USS Marquette AKA 95 at its port of call in the Mediterranean for 18 months. Four months prior to the completion of his assignment, he was informed that his residency position had been given to someone else. Fortunately, one week later, he was notified that the resident allocated to that position had decided to pursue a career in Obstetrics and gynaecology, and he would be allowed to return.

After an honorable discharge in 1954 at the rank of Lieutenant Senior Grade, he resumed his position as assistant resident in surgery before being promoted to Chief Resident in 1956. During his chief resident year, he became the first in the world to treat bleeding esophageal varices with intravenous vasopressin. Subsequent investigations into the drug's pharmacology and effectiveness would solidify the foundation of his experience as a surgical scientist. He graduated residency in 1957 and became double board certified in general surgery (American Board of Surgery) and thoracic surgery (Board of Thoracic Surgery).

== Academic appointments ==
He accepted his first academic appointment in 1957, where he became an Instructor of Surgery at the University of Rochester, Strong Memorial Hospital. In 1959, he founded the Surgical Residents' Conference, which persists today as an annual event incorporated in the meeting of the Society for Academic Surgeons. In 1964 he published the first english textbook on liver surgery, Surgical Diseases of the Liver. Between 1959 and 1969, he rapidly rose through the ranks of academic surgery, becoming Professor of Surgery in 1967. During this time he also became the Director of Surgical Research and would serve in this role for 20 years (1962–1982).

In 1987, he was appointed Chair of the Department of Surgery at the University of Rochester, a position he held until his retirement from clinical medicine in 1998. During Schwartz's tenure, recruitment within all general surgery sub-specialties and research flourished at the University of Rochester. He remained active in the University of Rochester Department of Surgery as the Distinguished Alumni Professor. Following his retirement, the surgical chair was endowed in his honor and to this day holds the title the Seymour I. Schwartz Chair of Surgery.

== Medical society memberships ==
Schwartz has belonged to numerous societies and served in leadership roles in some of the most prestigious medical societies. He served as the Vice Chairman of the American Board of Surgery from 1977 to 1979. He was elected president of the Society for Clinical Surgery in 1985 and also served as councilor for the Society of University Surgeons. In 1993, he was elected president of the American Surgical Association and in 1997 had the honor of being elected the president of the American College of Surgeons, the world's largest surgical organization.

Schwartz's was named to honorary membership in a number of foreign societies, including the Royal College of Surgeons of Edinburgh, Brazilian College of Surgeons, Mexican Association of General Surgery, Colombian Society of Surgery and Ecuadorian Surgical Society, among others. In 2005, he was appointed provost of American University of Antigua College of Medicine and received a medal from King Juan Carlos of Spain for contributions to surgery. He was invited to deliver over 200 guest lectures across the United States and in over 25 different countries.

== Schwartz's Principles of Surgery ==
Schwartz was Editor-in-Chief of Principles of Surgery (later editions titled Schwartz's Principles of Surgery) which has become one of the most widely read surgical textbooks in the United States and Internationally. In 1965, McGraw Hill Publishing Company approached six surgeons to write and edit a comprehensive textbook in surgery. It was intended to be the surgical complement to the company's earlier publication of Harrison's Textbook of Medicine, a leading textbook for Internal Medicine. At the time, Schwartz was known to McGraw Hill because of his recent publication, a textbook entitled, Surgical Diseases of the Liver. Schwartz was the most junior of the authors and therefore was the only surgeon on the editorial board who was not consumed by administrative responsibilities. He was unanimously voted to be the Editor-in-Chief by his co-editors, Dr. David Hume, Dr. Richard Lillehei, Dr. George Shires, Dr. F.C. Spencer, and Dr. E.H. Storer.

The textbook was published in 1969 and became an immediate national and international success. It has been translated into nine languages and was in its 11th edition as of August 2020. It is the most widely read surgical textbooks among surgical residents and is frequently encouraged, if not mandatory reading in a number of surgical residency programs. Schwartz remained the Editor-in-Chief for seven editions before passing this role on to F. Charles Brunicardi, M.D., FACS, the Moss Foundation Chair in Gastrointestinal and Personalized Surgery, Professor and Vice Chair Surgical Services, Chief of General Surgery, UCLA Santa Monica Medical Center, Department of Surgery at the David Geffen School of Medicine at UCLA. Among surgeons, the textbook is commonly referred to simply as "Schwartz" and is recognizable by its traditional yellow coloring.

== Cartography and map collecting ==
In July 1963, Schwartz was promoted to Associate Professor with unlimited tenure. On the same day he learned this news, Ruth suggested that he was too focused on surgery and needed a hobby. He agreed, on the condition that she find him a hobby. While in a secondhand book store, she purchased a used copy of R.V. Tooley's Maps and Mapmakers, which became the origin of his interest in cartography.

He made his first map purchase in 1965, a small map of New York State from 1795. In 1972 he began his collection of rare maps when he acquired the 1508 Ruysch world map. He continued to collect rare maps throughout the 1970s and in 1981 purchased one of only two known manuscript maps drawn by a 20 year old George Washington. The early 1980s was also a period when he developed an increasing expertise in cartography beginning with his authorship of the book titled The Mapping of America. This was followed by the publication of his books This Land is Your Land: The Geographic Evolution of the United States (2000), The Mis-Mapping of America (2003) and Putting "America" on the Map (2007). In 2008, he gifted the majority of his map collection to the University of Virginia in Charlottesville, Virginia, which subsequently dedicated the Schwartz Map Room in his honor.

== Historian ==
Schwartz's fascination with history has led him to research and write on a number of historical topics beginning with the 1995 publication of The French and Indian War, 1754 – 1763, and The Imperial Struggle for North America. He became a member of the advisory board of the National Museum of American History of the Smithsonian Institution and has served on the board of the Geography and Map Division of the Library of Congress. In 2009, he authored a manuscript on the contributions of American surgeons to the field of surgery in his book entitled, Gifted Hands. As an active octogenarian, he published several other historical books, including Holystic Medicine: The Patron Saints of Medicine and Cadwallader Colden: A Biography.

== Later career ==
Schwartz was the University of Rochester Department of Surgery Distinguished Alumni Professor. He remained an active member of the surgical community in Rochester and regularly attended Grand Round lectures. He delivered a prestigious and memorable Grand Round lecture in March 2015, highlighting the history of surgery and the legacy of the Department of Surgery at the University of Rochester. Schwartz continued to be an active participant in resident education and has recently led the way in raising nearly one million dollars for the University of Rochester Department of Surgery Resident Education Fund.

== Honors and awards ==
- 1945 Phi Eta Sigma, Freshman Honor Society, University of Wisconsin
- 1947 Phi Beta Kappa, University of Wisconsin
- 1950 Alpha Omega Alpha, New York University College of Medicine
- 1958 Sigma Xi, University of Rochester
- 1960 John and Mary R Markle Scholar in Academic Medicine
- 1963 "Man of the Year", Rochester Chamber of Commerce
- 1974 Sesquicentennial Medal, University of South Carolina
- 1975 Acrel Medal, Swedish Surgical Association
- 1978 Yandell Medal, Louisville, Kentucky
- 1979 Certificate of Merit, Rochester Academy of Medicine
- 1979 Albert A Strauss Medal, University of Illinois
- 1981 Certificate of Merit, Rochester Public Library
- 1981 Certificate of Merit, Rochester Museum of Science
- 1982 Henry C and Bertha H Buswell Distinguished Service Fellow
- 1985 Surgical Mentor Award, University of Rochester
- 1986 Distinguished Service Award, American College of Surgeons
- 1989 Honoris Causa, University of Lund, Sweden
- 1990 Roswell Park Medal
- 1991 James IV Association of Surgeons, Inc.
- 1991 Honorary Fellow, Philippine College of Surgeons, Philippines
- 1992 Albert David Kaiser Medal, Rochester Academy of Medicine
- 1993 Professor Honorario, Universidad Complutense, Madrid
- 1994 Commendation in Teaching, University of Rochester
- 1996 Annual Award from the Southwestern Pennsylvania Chapter of the American College of Surgeons
- 1996 The Solomon A. Berson Medical Alumni Award in Clinical Science, New York University School of Medicine Alumni Association
- 2000 Honorary Doctor of Science, University of Wisconsin
- 2000 Honoris Causa, University of Madrid
- 2001 American Philosophical Society
- 2005 Medal of Honor bestowed by King Juan Carlos of Spain
- 2005 Distinguished Alumni Award, University of Rochester School of Medicine and Dentistry
