= Antigua Freedom Party =

Antiguan political party

The Antigua Freedom Party was a political party in Antigua and Barbuda led by George "Rick" James.

The party contested the 1999 general elections with a single candidate, George James, running in the St. Johns Rural East constituency. James got only 57 votes and failed to win the seat. After the elections AFP claimed that the Antigua Labour Party government had committed electoral fraud, as they had let non-nationals to vote.
