= American University of Antigua =

Medical school located in Antigua and Barbuda

Coordinates: 17.158803°N 61.797355°W

American University of Antigua College of Medicine
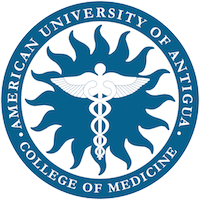
- Type: Medical school, Private, For-profit
- Established: 2004
- President: Peter Bell, MD
- Dean: Dr. David Graham
- Students: 1,400 (graduates as of 2015)
- Location: St. John's, Antigua and Barbuda
- Website: www.auamed.org

American University of Antigua (AUA) is a private for-profit international medical school located in Antigua and Barbuda.

== History ==
AUA was co-founded by Neal S. Simon, a lawyer and former president of Ross University. AUA began instruction in 2002. In 2008, Bengaluru-based Manipal Education and Medical Group (MEMG) purchased the college from New York-based Greater Caribbean Learning Resources, Inc. and formed Manipal Education Americas, LLC. In 2006, AUA College of Medicine was approved by the New York State Education Department and, in 2011, recognized by the Medical Board of California.

AUA is also recognized by the Massachusetts Board of Registration in Medicine, and is one of the few international medical schools whose graduates are not required to demonstrate substantial equivalence to receive medical licensure in the state of Massachusetts.

== Accreditations and approvals ==
AUA is fully accredited by the Caribbean Accreditation Authority for Education in Medicine and other Health Professions (CAAM-HP) and is listed in the World Directory of Medical Schools.

In 2011, Medical Board Of California recognized American University of Antigua College of Medicine. AUA is approved by the New York State Education Department (NYSED) to allow students to complete more than 12 weeks of clinical clerkships in New York State. AUA is one of eight Caribbean medical schools so approved by NYSED.

In 2015, access to the Federal Direct Student Loan Program was granted to American students at AUA.

== Academic profile ==
=== Admissions ===
AUA requires a minimum of 90 credits of college courses. Although MCAT scores are required for US citizens and permanent residents, they are not considered in AUA's admissions decisions; opting for a holistic approach to evaluating students instead.

=== Rankings and Reputation ===
The American University of Antigua was ranked in the top tier of medical schools in the Caribbean by the World Scholarship Forum in 2020, and by Money Inc. in 2019.

=== Curriculum ===
AUA follows an organ system-based block curriculum in small group settings, modeled after recent medical learning developments in US medical schools. The organ-based curriculum allows students to better understand the anatomy and histology of each organ and system, and how they function together as opposed to isolated subjects.

=== Degrees ===
AUA awards a Doctor of Medicine recognized with eligibility to practice in all 50 States in the U.S., Canada, and the United Kingdom.

=== Academic outcomes ===
According to the US Department of Education, 68.68% of students (125 out of 182) completed the program on time in 2022.

- Pass rates of its students and graduates on the United States Medical Licensing Examinations (USMLE) in calendar year 2022 were as follows:
  Step 1 – Basic Science 75.46%
  Step 2 – Clinical Knowledge 96.12%

For reference, the pass rates among the top 110 ranked American medical schools as reported by U.S. News Best Medical Schools rankings in 2019 were as follows:

- Step 1 – Basic Science 96.3%
- Step 2 – Clinical Knowledge 96.6%

== Student loan debt ==
The US Department of Education reports median student loan debt of Americans who attended was $311,448 in 2022. Default rate as of 2019 was 0.3%.

== Collaboration and agreements ==
In 2013, AUA signed an affiliation agreement with the Florida International University Herbert Wertheim College of Medicine that allows AUA clinical students to complete all of their core clinical rotations in the Greater Miami Area.

In 2019, AUA College of Medicine signed an inaugural transfer agreement with Warwick Medical School, allowing high achieving students the opportunity to transfer to the University of Warwick's medical school to finish their MD after completing their basic sciences at AUA.

In 2020, AUA signed an affiliation agreement with the Florida International University Robert Stempel College of Public Health and Social Work that provides AUA students and graduates with priority admission to FIU for a Master's in Public Health (MPH) degree.

== Notable faculty ==
Dr. Seymour L. Schwartz was a renowned surgeon, Alumni Professor for the Department of Surgery at the University of Rochester, and co-author and editor-in-chief of Schwartz's Principles of Surgery. He is considered as one of the most honored and influential surgeons in American history as a pioneer in surgery, surgical education and leadership. Dr. Schwartz was appointed as University Provost and Chief Academic Officer of the American University of Antigua.

Dr. Darrick E. Antell is a plastic surgeon and reconstructive surgeon whose research has been featured in the Smithsonian Institution's National Museum of Natural History. Dr. Antell was appointed as a clinical faculty member and guest lecturer at the American University of Antigua.

== See also ==
- International medical graduate
- List of medical schools in the Caribbean
- List of universities in Antigua and Barbuda
