= Clare Hall Secondary School =

School in Saint John, Antigua and Barbuda

Coordinates: 17.1275°N 61.8223°W

- Clare Hall, Saint John; Antigua and Barbuda

Information
- Motto: "Striving for Excellence"
- Established: 1971
- Faculty: 91
- Enrollment: 762
- Website: http://mychss.online

Clare Hall Secondary School is a public government secondary school in Clare Hall, Saint John.

There are currently 762 students enrolled at the institution, and there are 91 teachers and other staff members to support them. The start of the school day is at 7:55 in the morning, morning prayers are held at the school every day between the hours of 8:00 and 8:15, the eighth and final period, which is also the last class, is over at 1:30. A total of 835 students were enrolled at the institution during the 2017–2018 academic year. The school accommodates students in forms 1 through 5.

== Sports ==
The Clare Hall Secondary School athletic teams have been successful in a number of tournaments, including the 2022 Inter-school Cricket competition, in which they triumphed over the Sir Novelle Richards Academy by a score of 176 runs. In the year 2022, CHSS also won the volleyball match against All Saints Secondary School (ASSS) with scores of 18–25, 25–15, and 15–11.
