= List of universities in Antigua and Barbuda =

This is a list of universities in Antigua and Barbuda.

== Universities ==
- American University of Antigua (AUA) College of Medicine
- Metropolitan University College of Medicine (MUCM)
- University of Health Sciences Antigua (UHSA)
- University of the West Indies at Five Islands

== Colleges and training institutions ==
- Antigua State College (ASC)
- Antigua and Barbuda Hospitality Training Institute (ABHTI)
- Antigua and Barbuda International Institute of Technology (ABIIT)

== See also ==
- List of universities by country
- List of schools in Antigua and Barbuda
