= Christ the King High School (Antigua) =

Location
- Old Parham Road; St. John's; Antigua and Barbuda; 17.1246°N 61.8332°W

Information
- School type: Private
- Motto: Excelsior (Higher Yet)
- Denomination: Catholic
- Established: 18 September 1933
- Founder: Sisters of the Immaculate Heart of Mary
- Session: 8:00am–2:00pm
- Principal: Mrs. Halima Zachariah
- Gender: female
- Age: 11 to 17
- Average class size: 30
- Hours in school day: 7
- Classrooms: 10
- Campuses: 1
- Colors: Beige, Green and Blue
- Song: "A Youthful Band"
- Sports: Football, Volleyball, Basketball, Netball, Track and Field, Captain Ball

Christ the King High School is a secondary school located on Old Parham Road in St. John's, Antigua and Barbuda. It is the only all-girls Catholic high school located on the island of Antigua; however, in the past it was once a co-ed school. Its brother school is St. Joseph's Academy. If the child is not of age to go to the School there is a school for children named St.John's Catholic and a pre-school named Early Childhood Pre-school.

== Notable alumni ==
- Ashley Boodhoo, Miss Antigua and Barbuda 2018
- George-Ann Ryan, Chief Financial Officer of The Sadie Collective and Chief Operating Officer at Ryan Group of Companies

== See also ==
- List of schools in Antigua and Barbuda
