= Schwartz's Principles of Surgery =

Seminal textbook of surgery originally written by Seymour I. Schwartz

- Author: Seymour I. Schwartz (1st edition)
- Language: English
- Subject: Surgery
- Genre: Reference
- Publisher: McGraw-Hill
- Publication date: 2019 (11th edition)
- ISBN: 978-1259835353

Schwartz's Principles of Surgery is a seminal textbook of surgery originally written by Seymour I. Schwartz. The first edition was published in 1969 by McGraw-Hill; the latest edition (2019) was the 11th edition, and the textbook's 50th anniversary. The editions were published in the following years, from newest to oldest: 2019, 2015, 2010, 2005, 1999, 1994, 1989, 1984, 1979, 1974, and 1969.

== Contents ==
The chapters of the eleventh edition are:

1. Leadership in Surgery
2. Systemic Response to Injury and Metabolic Support
3. Fluid and Electrolyte Management of the Surgical Patient
4. Hemostasis, Surgical Bleeding, and Transfusion
5. Shock
6. Surgical Infections
7. Trauma
8. Burns
9. Wound Healing
10. Oncology
11. Transplantation
12. Quality, Patient Safety, Assessments of Care, and Complications
13. Physiologic Monitoring of the Surgical Patient
14. Minimally Invasive Surgery, Robotics, Natural Orifice Transluminal Endoscopic Surgery, and Single-Incision Laparoscopic Surgery
15. Molecular Biology, The Atomic Theory of Disease, and Precision Surgery
16. The Skin and Subcutaneous Tissue
17. The Breast
18. Disorders of the Head and Neck
19. Chest Wall, Lung, Mediastinum, and Pleura
20. Congenital Heart Disease
21. Acquired Heart Disease
22. Thoracic Aneurysms and Aortic Dissection
23. Arterial Disease
24. Venous and Lymphatic Disease
25. Esophagus and Diaphragmatic Hernia
26. Stomach
27. The Surgical Management of Obesity
28. Small Intestine
29. Colon, Rectum, and Anus
30. The Appendix
31. Liver
32. Gallbladder and the Extrahepatic Biliary System
33. Pancreas
34. The Spleen
35. Abdominal Wall, Omentum, Mesentery, and Retroperitoneum
36. Soft Tissue Sarcomas
37. Inguinal Hernias
38. Thyroid, Parathyroid, and Adrenal
39. Pediatric Surgery
40. Urology
41. Gynecology
42. Neurosurgery
43. Orthopedic Surgery
44. Surgery of the Hand and Wrist
45. Plastic and Reconstructive Surgery
46. Anesthesia for Surgical Patients
47. Surgical Considerations in Older Adults
48. Ethics, Palliative Care, and Care at the End of Life
49. Global Surgery
50. Optimizing Perioperative Care: Enhanced Recovery and Chinese Medicine
51. Understanding, Evaluating, and Using Evidence for Surgical Practice
52. Ambulatory Surgery
53. Skills and Simulation
54. Web-Based Education and Implications of Social Media
