= Antigua Girls' High School =

Secondary school in Antigua and Barbuda

Location
- St. John's, Antigua and Barbuda; Antigua and Barbuda
- 17°7′24.91″N 61°50′32.15″W

Information
- Type: Secondary school
- Motto: Mel est bonum, sic est doctrina
- Established: 1886; 140 years ago
- Principal: Rosalind Beazer

Antigua Girls' High School (AGHS) is an all-girls public secondary school in St. John's, Antigua and Barbuda. Admissions are primarily based on the Grade Six National Assessment, with top scoring students being able to attend AGHS or its boys' counterpart, Antigua Grammar School. It was founded two years after Antigua Grammar School in 1886, as the institution's girls' counterpart. The school has changed locations several times due to its growing student population, and it was transferred to the government in 1964. The school had relatively limited course options until quite recently, with students having to go to Antigua Grammar School for science classes as late as the 1960s.
