= Youth in Antigua and Barbuda =

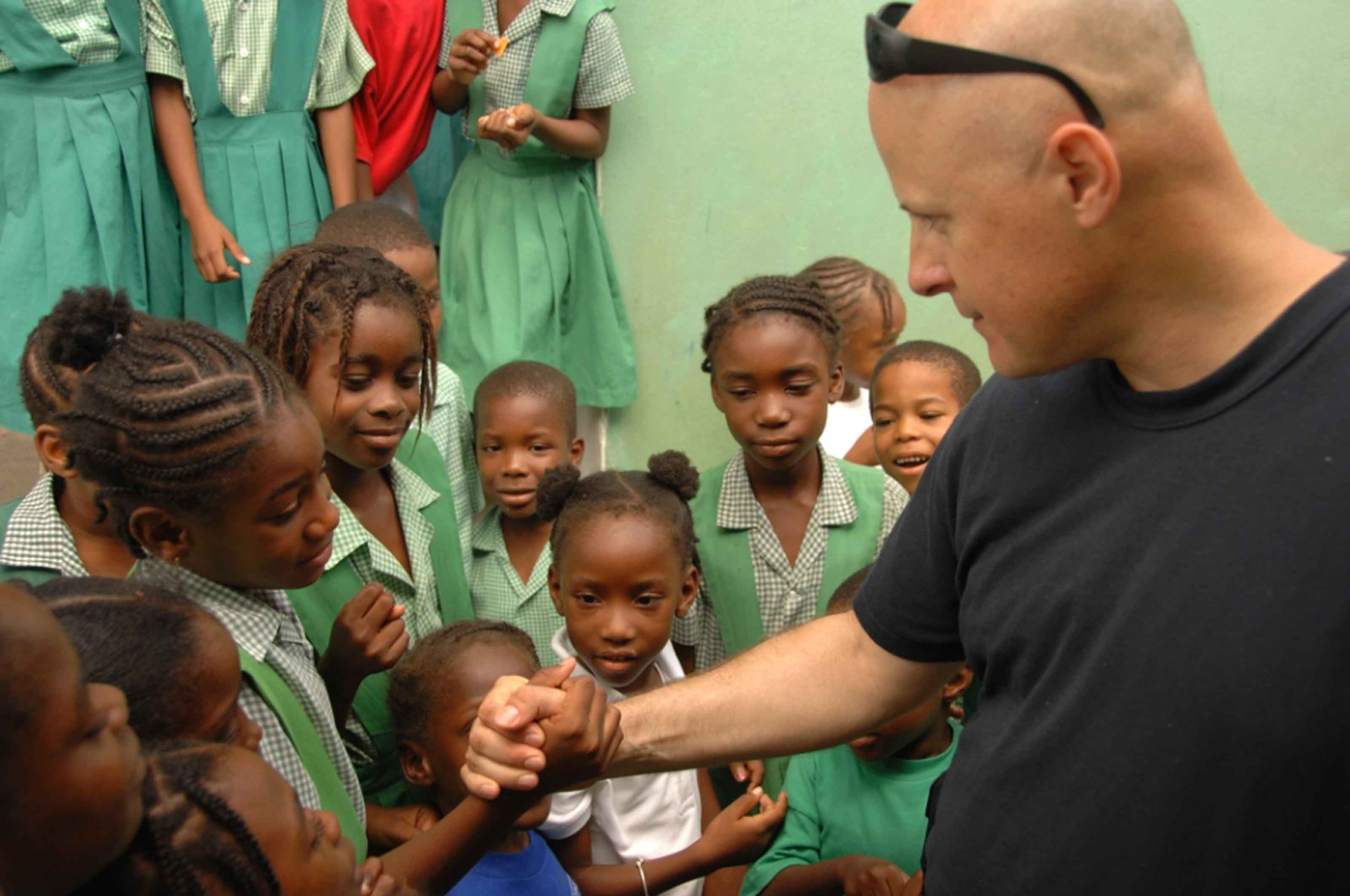
Antiguan and Barbudan children at a local school.

In terms of the demography of the country, youth in Antigua and Barbuda can be categorized together as one age group. It was projected that 29.23% of the population of Antigua and Barbuda was aged 0–17 years in 2011. (12,257 females and 12,538 males).

== Education ==
The percentage of males aged 0-17 who go to school is 84.21%, while the percentage of females aged 0-17 who go to school is 84.72%. However, these numbers include those who are younger than five years old as well. When looking at young girls ages 5 to 9, 97.91% of those in that age range went to school full time. Full-time education is pursued by 74.40% of young women between the ages of 15 and 19, compared to 98.58% of young girls between the ages of 10 and 14. 51.98% of young females between the ages of 0 and 4 are enrolled in full-time education. When looking at males, the percentage of male children aged 5 to 9 years old who are enrolled in school full time is 97.89%, while the percentage of male children 10 to 14 years old is 98.56%, and the percentage of male children aged 15 to 19 years old is 73.22%. The percentage of males aged 0 to 4 years old who are enrolled in school is 51.68%.

== Health ==
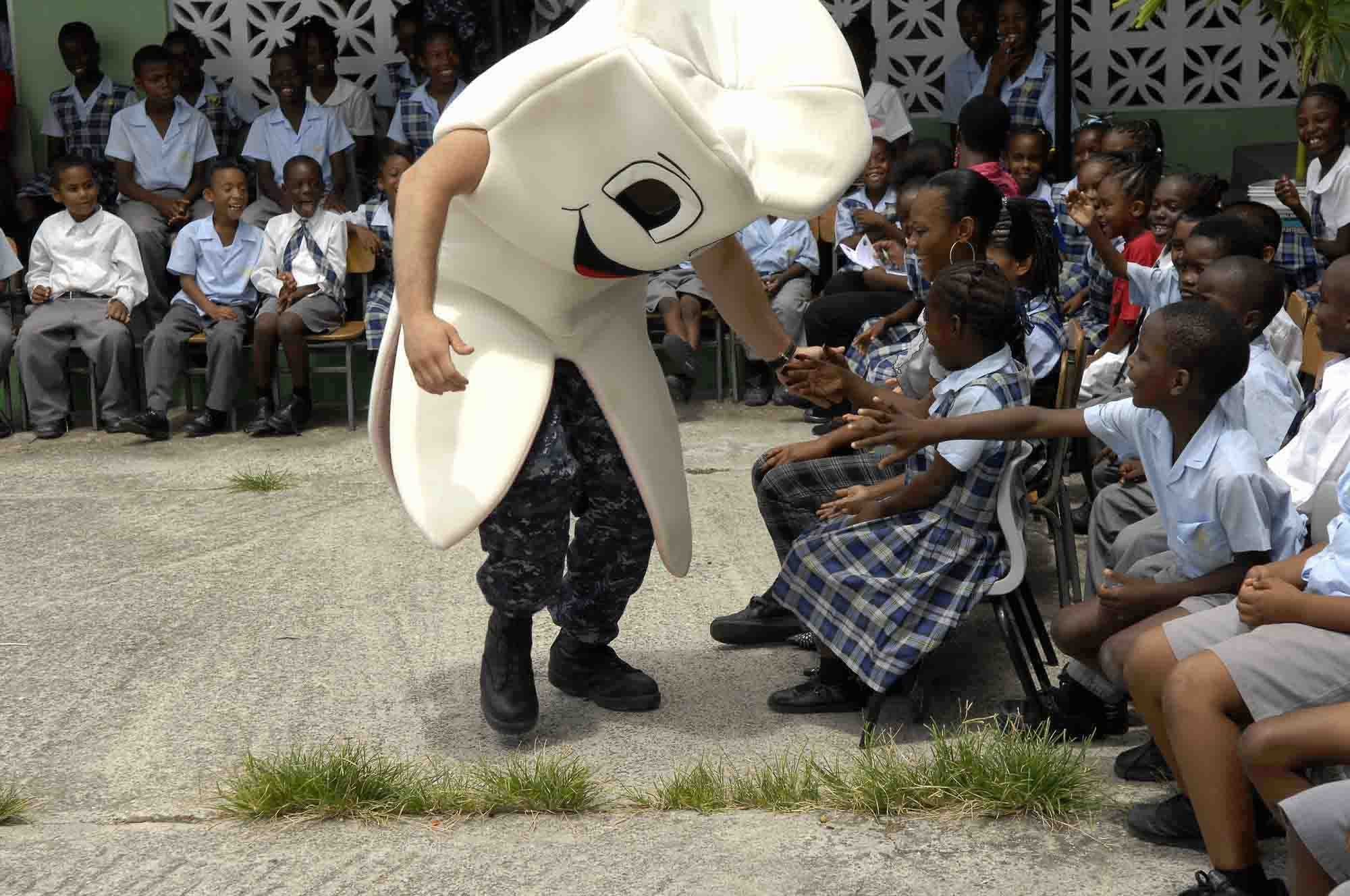
Students at Pares Primary School.

The young people of Antigua and Barbuda, aged 0 to 17, are in generally good health. In terms of HIV, 0.06% of male youth and 0.02% of female youth are living with the virus respectively. Regarding AIDS, 0.04% of male youths and none of their female counterparts are currently living with the virus.

A significant number of young people in Antigua and Barbuda suffer from sickle cell. Sickle cell affects 1.05% male youth and 0.90% female youth. The City of Saint John's has the highest prevalence of sickle cell in young males, whilst the Parish of Saint Philip has the highest prevalence of sickle cell in young females.

There are people living with allergies in every part of Antigua & Barbuda. Allergies affect 7.48% of male adolescents and 8.23% of female adolescents. 7.45% of male adolescents in Saint John's City, 6.94% of male adolescents in Saint John's Rural, 8.67% of male adolescents in Saint George, 7.41% of male adolescents in Saint Peter, 6.58% of male adolescents in Saint Philip, 8.16% of male adolescents in Saint Paul, 8.40% of male adolescents in Saint Mary, and 6.83% of male adolescents in Barbuda have allergies. 8.79% of female youth in Saint John's City, 6.90% of female youth in Saint John's Rural, 9.09% of female youth in Saint George, 9.48% of female youth in Saint Peter, 8.66% of female youth in Saint Philip, 8.27% of female youth in Saint Paul, 9.45% of female youth in Saint Mary, and 10.38% of female youth in Barbuda have allergies.
