= Ottos, St. John's =

Ottos
- Village
- Location within Antigua and Barbuda
- Coordinates: 17°6′44″N 61°50′17″W
- Country: Antigua and Barbuda
- Island: Antigua
- Civil parish: Saint John Parish

Government
  - Type: Village Council (possibly dissolved)

Population (2011)
  - Total: 543
- Time zone: UTC-4 (AST)

Ottos is a settlement in Saint John Parish, Antigua and Barbuda.

== History ==
=== Otto's Estate ===
The capitulation paper that ended the French and British conflict, as well as letters that were exchanged between the two after the war, bear Colonel Sebastiaen's prominent signature, who is of Dutch descent. He immigrated to Antigua from Holland at the beginning of the island's colonization. He died in London in 1704, and his will, dated 17 June 1701 (proved by the executors on 26 October 1704 and recorded in Antigua on 17 June 1705), bequeathed "to my nephew, Bastiaen Otto Baijer, the eldest son of my nephew John Otto Baijer, a moiety of my plantation of 588 acres in St. John's Division." Also, his will stipulated that his remains should be buried in the Dutch church's crypt in Austin Friars. Many of his offspring died and bequeathed their inheritance to the person who took his name. They often spent a year or two living on the island. Letters written by Johann Otto Baijer, the estate manager and agent for William Crosbie, are included in the William Crosbie Estate Records (#2). (1792–1816).

Otto's Bluff was located on the hill known as Michael's Hill, south of St. John's, where the Mt. St. John Hospital is now, and it was above Garling's territory. It had a view of Country Pond.

On the estate hill where the Antigua and Barbuda Archives are now situated, a place of worship called the Scotch Kirk was first constructed. It was never regarded as a very spectacular structure from an architectural standpoint.

Due to what appears to have been the lack of interest in the Presbyterian religion at the time, the church was destroyed in the middle of the 1800s and was never rebuilt. The bell was handed to the Anglican Church and is probably still there. The tower's North tower is home to the carillon, a collection of 13 antique bells that includes one from the Golden Grove estate (#23). The clock strikes the hour with the help of one huge bell. Given by W. H. Thompson and A. Coltart to the Presbyterian Church in Antigua, Thomas Mears the Founder, London 1842, is written on it. The bell has a base diameter of 40 inches and is around 30 inches high without the bracket on top. It is bronze die-cast. Two bells, one for weddings and one for funerals, are located in the south tower.

The British Parliament awarded Otto's a legacy payment of £2,549 in 1833 for liberating 175 slaves. Langford Lovell, who at the time owned the estate, was the lone recipient of the prize.

Another extremely powerful earthquake struck Antigua in 1833 between eight and nine in the evening. Between twelve at night and five in the morning, there were twenty-one different shocks. Many believed that a meteor impacting a wooden structure was what caused the fire that started at Otto's estate. Credence was given to this when the Otto's estate counsel saw a meteor land upon and ignite a branch of a coco-nut tree that was close to his home.

Richard Abbott is listed as the manager at Otto's Plantation in an 1844 census; Alfred Nanton is listed as the overseer.

About 1804, if not before, Daniel Burr Garling seems to have landed in Antigua. Blue Records indicate that Daniel served as acting assistant superintendent of agriculture in 1804 and acting second outdoor officer in the Treasury in 1805. In 1807 and 1809, he served as acting harbormaster and first outdoor officer in the Treasury. He had worked for 27 years until he died. The Colonial Office granted the government's recommendation to provide his wife a £50 yearly stipend. He contributed 59 letters from Antigua to the Bible Society between 1818 and 1856. He was also actively involved in Nathaniel Gilbert's preaching and the Wesleyan-Methodist Church. In 1837, he was present when the cornerstone was laid.

"Six Months Trip in Antigua & Jamaica," by James A. Thomas and Horace Kimball. In the 1822 committee for the English Harbour Sunday School Society for Boys and Girls, Daniel's name can be found. John Gilbert, Esq. served as vice chairman, while Mrs. Gilbert oversaw the girls' school and served as book steward. He was listed as the representative for 39 estates in 1849. His 1830 letters demonstrate his freedom support and state "The Gang of Slaves that were at Crawford's are to be freed in the year 1833 — around 150 individuals, old and young — and I believe a plot of land will be obtained for them to live and maintain themselves upon. As a result, Antigua is probably going to receive free peasantry first. No free people have ever worked in the field before, which has caused a lot of difficulty for planters. However, if these people occasionally hired themselves out as a Gang to dig holes by the acre or perform other tasks to which they are accustomed, there will undoubtedly be some support for a new and better system of things. I hope you occasionally pray for Slaves and the people of Antigua - you should, as most of your ease & comfort spring from thence.”

Before purchasing Otto's land in 1858, Daniel Burr Garling worked as an attorney for a number of the proprietors of sugar plantations in Antigua. He gave his son Samuel Henry Garling, whose wife was Harriet Maria (née Caddy), and Caroline Sophia Garling, his daughter, the estate. He was the author's great-great-great-grandfather, and numerous letters he wrote to a Mr. Charles Curtis have been discovered.

Daniel Garling's son, Samuel Henry, established himself as a businessman in St. John's and lost the family's riches and estate in gambling, leaving only "Garling's Land," a tiny sliver of property between Mount Saint John Medical Center and the bay. Harriet Maria Garling, his wife, eventually received the title to that land. In 1868, Samuel boarded a ship for Antigua and never returned. Samuel Henry Garling's death notice was recorded in the Parramatta District Post Office Directory in Grevilles, 258 miles north of Sydney (Index 10851/1892), Macquarie. "Unknown parents" are listed. After renting a horse, which returned to the livery stables without him, he was discovered shot to death in a ditch. The author's great-grandmother, Margaret Furlong Conacher (née McSevney), recalls having to ride in a buggy with Harriet Garling every Saturday in the early 1900s to collect rent from the underprivileged people living on Garling's property. Even though the rent at the time was only one or two shillings, many struggled to make ends meet.

The Garlings' inheritance was settled by selling the remaining of the land to private buyers in 1948, with £3,870 going to each of the heirs, Mrs. Goodall, Mr. N. Garling, Mrs. A. Goodwin, Mrs. Duncan, and Mrs. M. Conacher. It was mentioned that Lot 10 sold for $890, Lot 11A sold for $1200, and Lot 11B sold for $1440 at the property's sale. The value of a dollar in Antigua at the time was equal to 100 English halfpennies, or 4 shillings and one penny.

Otto's cane returns to the Antigua Sugar Plant Ltd. were estimated at 1,585 tons from 68 acres in 1941. Actual canning weight: 822 tons at a density of 9.72 tons per acre.

== Demographics ==
Ottos has two enumeration districts.

- 14000 Ottos School
- 14100 Ottos (West)

Ethnic
Q48 Ethnic	Counts	%
African descendent	487	89.71%
East Indian/India	2	0.39%
Mixed (Other)	28	5.24%
Hispanic	21	3.88%
Other	3	0.58%
Don't know/Not stated	1	0.19%
Total	543	100.00%

Religion
Q49 Religion	Counts	%
Adventist	69	12.67%
Anglican	116	21.44%
Baptist	24	4.48%
Church of God	13	2.34%
Evangelical	1	0.19%
Jehovah Witness	9	1.75%
Methodist	39	7.21%
Moravian	55	10.14%
None/no religion	43	7.99%
Pentecostal	38	7.02%
Rastafarian	5	0.97%
Roman Catholic	61	11.31%
Weslyan Holiness	7	1.36%
Other	44	8.19%
Don't know/Not stated	16	2.92%
Total	541	100.00%
NotApp :	2	

Country of birth
Q58. Country of birth	Counts	%
Africa	1	0.19%
Antigua and Barbuda	382	70.29%
Other Caribbean countries	6	1.17%
Dominica	28	5.24%
Dominican Republic	24	4.47%
Guyana	44	8.16%
Jamaica	34	6.21%
Monsterrat	1	0.19%
St. Kitts and Nevis	1	0.19%
St. Lucia	2	0.39%
St. Vincent and the Grenadines	1	0.19%
Trinidad and Tobago	1	0.19%
United Kingdom	1	0.19%
USA	11	1.94%
USVI United States Virgin Islands	1	0.19%
Not Stated	4	0.78%
Total	543	100.00%

Country of Citizenship
Q71 Country of Citizenship 1	Counts	%
Antigua and Barbuda	438	80.78%
Other Caribbean countries	3	0.58%
Dominica	17	3.11%
Dominican Republic	13	2.33%
Guyana	30	5.44%
Jamaica	31	5.63%
Monsterrat	1	0.19%
St. Vincent and the Grenadines	1	0.19%
United Kingdom	1	0.19%
USA	5	0.97%
Not Stated	3	0.58%
Total	543	100.00%

Country of Second/Dual Citizenship
Q71 Country of Citizenship 2 (Country of Second/Dual Citizenship)	Counts	%
Other Caribbean countries	5	10.00%
Dominica	9	18.00%
Dominican Republic	7	14.00%
Guyana	14	26.00%
Jamaica	3	6.00%
St. Lucia	2	4.00%
Trinidad and Tobago	1	2.00%
United Kingdom	2	4.00%
USA	7	14.00%
Other countries	1	2.00%
Total	53	100.00%
NotApp :	490	
