= Clare Hall, Antigua and Barbuda =

Clare Hall
- Village
- Eastbound on Old Parham Road, 2026
- Interactive map of the Clare Hall main place
- Location within Antigua and Barbuda
- Coordinates: 17°7′35.44″N 61°49′29.46″W
- Country: Antigua and Barbuda
- Island: Antigua
- Civil parish: Saint John Parish

Government
  - Type: Village Council (possibly dissolved)

Population (2011)
  - Total: 1,459
- Time zone: UTC-4

Clare Hall is a village in Saint John Parish, Antigua and Barbuda.

The village is also home to Clare Hall Secondary School, which received nationwide attention for its instances of violence.

== Demographics ==
Clare Hall has four enumeration districts.

- 31900 Upper Clare Hall
- 32000 Clare Hall-Central
- 32100 Clare Hall-Christian Union
- 32200 Clare Hall School

=== Census data (2011) ===
Q48 Ethnic	Counts	%
African descendent	1,258	86.22%
Caucasian/White	3	0.23%
East Indian/India	28	1.89%
Mixed (Black/White)	24	1.67%
Mixed (Other)	51	3.48%
Hispanic	43	2.95%
Syrian/Lebanese	29	1.97%
Other	14	0.98%
Don't know/Not stated	9	0.61%
Total	1,459	100.00%

Q49 Religion	Counts	%
Adventist	127	8.89%
Anglican	202	14.14%
Baptist	56	3.94%
Church of God	116	8.11%
Evangelical	100	7.03%
Jehovah Witness	18	1.24%
Methodist	102	7.11%
Moravian	84	5.87%
Nazarene	19	1.31%
None/no religion	73	5.10%
Pentecostal	156	10.90%
Rastafarian	6	0.39%
Roman Catholic	150	10.51%
Wesleyan Holiness	29	2.01%
Other	113	7.88%
Don't know/Not stated	80	5.56%
Total	1,429	100.00%
NotApp :	30	

Q55 Internet Use	Counts	%
Yes	781	53.52%
No	656	44.97%
Don't know/Not stated	22	1.51%
Total	1,459	100.00%

Q58. Country of birth	Counts	%
Africa	4	0.30%
Other Latin or North American countries	2	0.15%
Antigua and Barbuda	950	65.10%
Other Caribbean countries	23	1.59%
Canada	10	0.68%
Other Asian countries	6	0.38%
Other European countries	3	0.23%
Dominica	88	6.06%
Dominican Republic	29	1.97%
Guyana	153	10.52%
Jamaica	50	3.41%
Monsterrat	8	0.53%
St. Kitts and Nevis	7	0.45%
St. Lucia	21	1.44%
St. Vincent and the Grenadines	8	0.53%
Syria	23	1.59%
Trinidad and Tobago	1	0.08%
United Kingdom	1	0.08%
USA	47	3.26%
USVI United States Virgin Islands	8	0.53%
Not Stated	17	1.14%
Total	1,459	100.00%

Q71 Country of Citizenship 1	Counts	%
Antigua and Barbuda	1,195	81.91%
Other Caribbean countries	13	0.91%
Canada	2	0.15%
Other Asian and Middle Eastern countries	19	1.29%
Dominica	38	2.57%
Dominican Republic	17	1.14%
Guyana	82	5.60%
Jamaica	38	2.57%
Monsterrat	2	0.15%
St. Lucia	13	0.91%
St. Vincent and the Grenadines	3	0.23%
United Kingdom	1	0.08%
USA	19	1.29%
Other countries	7	0.45%
Not Stated	11	0.76%
Total	1,459	100.00%

Q71 Country of Citizenship 2	Counts	%
Other Caribbean countries	21	7.51%
Canada	11	3.95%
Other Asian and Middle Eastern countries	9	3.16%
Dominica	49	17.39%
Dominican Republic	15	5.53%
Guyana	72	25.69%
Jamaica	13	4.74%
Monsterrat	7	2.37%
St. Lucia	8	2.77%
St. Vincent and the Grenadines	6	1.98%
Trinidad and Tobago	1	0.40%
United Kingdom	10	3.56%
USA	53	18.97%
Other countries	6	1.98%
Total	279	100.00%
NotApp :	1,179	

Employment status	Counts	%
Employed	733	63.36%
Unemployed	61	5.25%
Inactive	354	30.63%
Not stated	9	0.76%
Total	1,157	100.00%
NotApp :	301	
