= Dow Hill =

Coordinates: 17°0′44″N 61°44′50″W

- Village
- Interactive map of the Dow Hill main place
- Country: Antigua and Barbuda
- Parish: Saint Paul

Area
  - Total: 6.8 km^{2} (2.6 sq mi)

Population (2011)
  - Total: 174

Dow Hill is a village in Saint Paul, Antigua and Barbuda. It had a population of 174 people in 2011 and is named after Dow Hill.

== Geography ==
According to the Antigua and Barbuda Statistics Division, the village had a total area of 6.8 square kilometres in 2011.

== Demographics ==
There were 174 people living in Dow Hill as of the 2011 census. The village was 63.41% African, 26.83% white, 3.66% other, 2.44% mixed black/white, 1.83% other mixed, 1.22% not stated, 0.61% East Indian. The population was born in different countries, including 55.49% in Antigua and Barbuda, 10.98% in the United Kingdom, 10.98% in the United States, and 8.54% in other European countries. The population had diverse religious affiliations, including 17.79% irreligious, 17.18% Anglican, 16.56% Methodist, and 16.56% Roman Catholic. It has one of the highest proportions of irreligious people in the country, and one of the only where irreligious people make up the largest religious group.
