= Tim Hector =

Antiguan politician (1942–2002)

- Born: Leonard Churchill Hector; 24 November 1942; St. John's, Antigua
- Died: 12 November 2002 (aged 59); Antigua
- Education: Antigua Grammar School; Acadia University; McGill University
- Occupation: Political activist
- Political party: Antigua Caribbean Liberation Movement

Leonard "Tim" Hector (24 November 1942 – 12 November 2002) was a leftist Antiguan political leader and cricket administrator known for his opposition to the rule of the Bird family.

== Early life ==
Born in St John's, Antigua, and named Leonard Churchill Hector, he was called "Tim" by his grandfather as a term of endearment stemming from the Russian General Semyon Timoshenko, and in later years was better known as Tim Hector. (During World War II in the Caribbean, naming children Churchill, Winston, and Roosevelt was common.) After attending the Antigua Grammar School, widely known as an exceptional student, and later teaching there, Hector went on to Acadia University and McGill University. He broke off graduate studies in Philosophy at McGill to return home, where he felt his contribution was needed.

Hector was a founder of the Antigua Caribbean Liberation Movement in 1968. The party supported socialism, the Cuban Revolution, and a pan-Caribbean vision. He also published the newspaper The Outlet and the online column "Fan the Flame".

== Human rights case ==
His name has become particularly associated with a leading human rights case, referred to as Hector v. Attorney-General of Antigua & others [1990] 2 AC 312, 2 All ER 103, 2 WLR 606, TLR 23.1.90 and The Independent. The case was heard and decided by the Judicial Committee of the Privy Council, which sits as the final court of appeal for certain countries in the British Commonwealth. This was a major constitutional case, specifically dealing with freedom of speech and of the press. There were also commentaries in The Times, by Geoffrey Bindman, and in The Guardian by James Michael.

The words of Lord Bridge of Harwich in his judgment (at p. 318) are those most frequently cited:

"In a free democratic society it is almost too obvious to need stating that those who hold office in government and who are responsible for public administration must always be open to criticism. Any attempt to stifle or fetter such criticism amounts to political censorship of the most insidious and objectionable kind. At the same time it is no less obvious that the very purpose of criticism levelled at those who have the conduct of public affairs by their political opponents is to undermine public confidence in their stewardship and to persuade the electorate that the opponents would make a better job of it than those presently holding office. In the light of these considerations their Lordships cannot help viewing a statutory provision which criminalises statements likely to undermine public confidence in the conduct of public affairs with the utmost suspicion."

The case has been frequently cited in cases subsequently. For instance, Inter-American Court of Human Rights Case No. 12.441 "Luisiana Ríos", it was cited in a case concerning Venezuela in the Inter-American Court of Human Rights, other references spread from Australia, South Africa to Canada and many other places.

One interesting, if little known fact about the case was that the solicitor for the Appellant, Richard Hallmark, in preparing the case for the appeal hearing, placed before the court a series of extracts of the legislation of most of the eastern European states which had, as communist states, created offences in very similar terms to those sought to be justified by the government of Antigua & Barbuda but which had, even in some cases in only a matter of days and weeks before the hearing in the Privy Council, been repealed. The relevance of those developments was clear but not actually argued upon in the hearing. Given the uncertainty about the role of the Privy Council at that time, and indeed whether it had a role in such appeal cases, this case may be interpreted as significant in the history of that Court as an institution too.

Hector died at the age of 59 on 12 November 2002, having been suffering from heart disease. He was given a state funeral in Antigua.

== Legacy ==
The Leonard Tim Hector Memorial Committee is a non-profit group formed to keep alive Hector's work and memory, including through an Annual Distinguished Leonard Tim Hector Memorial Lecture and the Leonard Tim Hector Memorial Award.
