= Antigua Grammar School =

Secondary school in Antigua and Barbuda

Location
- St. John's, Antigua and Barbuda; Antigua and Barbuda
- 17°7′21.54″N 61°50′7.96″W

Information
- Type: Secondary school
- Motto: Semper Virens
- Established: 1884; 142 years ago
- Principal: Samuel Roberts
- Website: ags.edu.ag

Antigua Grammar School (AGS) is an all-boys public secondary school in St. John's, Antigua and Barbuda. It practices selective admissions, with top scorers in the Grade Six National Assessment being granted spots here and in its girls' counterpart, Antigua Girls' High School. The school was founded in 1884, initially as an Anglican school for middle class black boys, as well as the sons of the white-dominated plantocracy. In the 1970s the school was transferred from the church to the government.
