= List of plantations in Antigua and Barbuda =

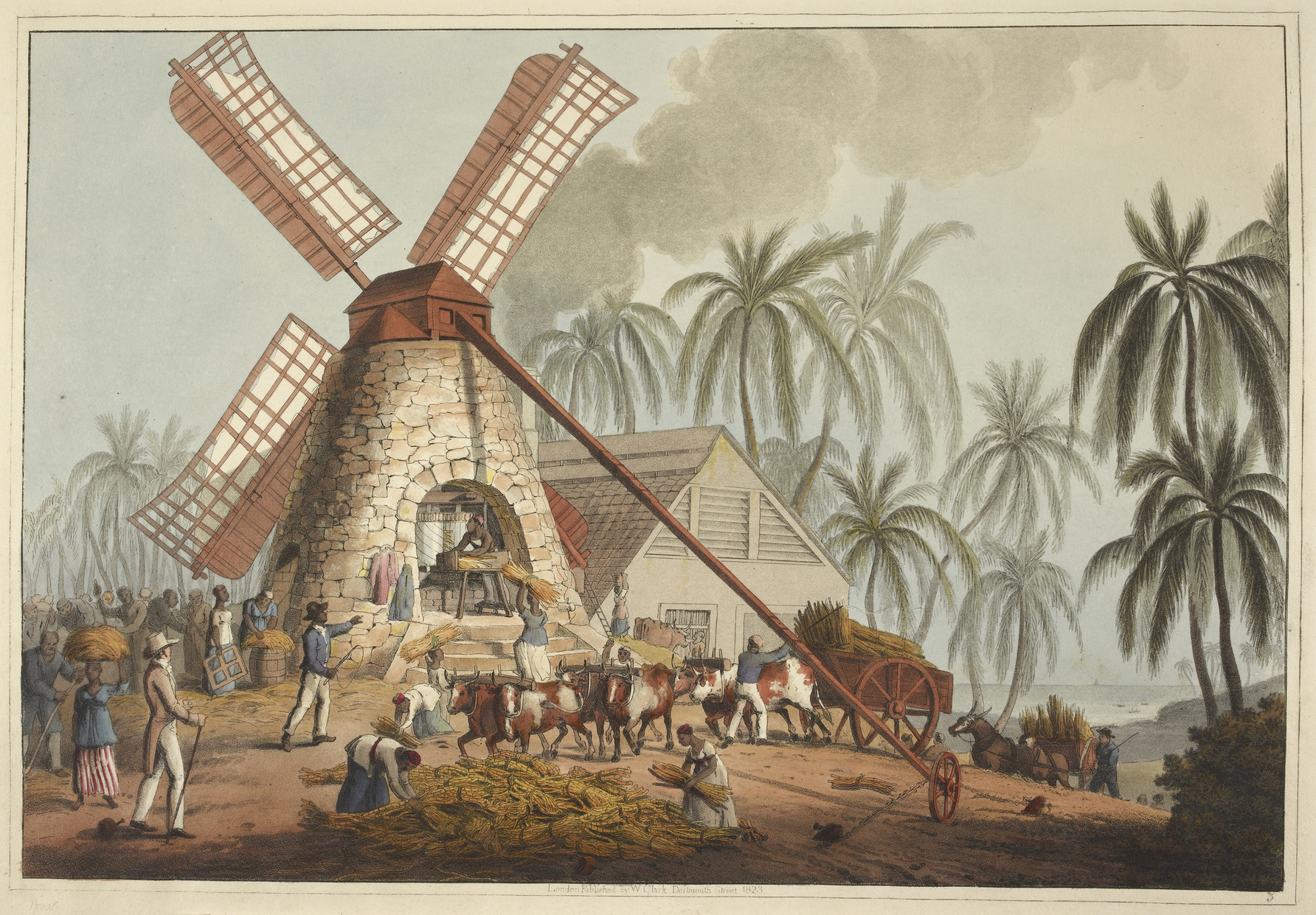
Sugar plantation in Antigua, 1823

This is a list of plantations in Antigua and Barbuda. The archipelago's economy was historically dominated by the sugar industry, which fundamentally changed the island's geography and helped strengthen the power of the island's plantocracy, who had unquestioned dominance over Antiguan and Barbudan society and politics until the collapse of the sugar industry following World War II.

== A ==
- Allen's Estate
- Archbold's Estate

== B ==
- Barnacle Point
- Barter's Estate
- Belvedere Plantation
- Betty's Hope
- Big Duers
- Blubber Valley
- Bodkin's Estate
- Body Ponds Plantation
- Boone's Estate
- Boy's Training Centre
- Brecknock's Plantation
- Briggin's Estate
- Brook's Estate
- Brook's Estate
- Brown's Bay Estate
- Buckshorne's Estate
- Burke's Estate

== C ==
- Christian Valley
- Claremont
- Cochran's Estate
- Colebrook's Estate
- Collin's Estate
- Cooks
- Cotton Garden
- Cotton New Works

== D ==
- Date Hill
- Delaps
- Denfield's Estate
- Dimsdale Estate
- Donovan's Estate
- Douglas's Estate
- Drew's Hill
- Dunbars
- Dunnings

== E ==
- Elliott's Estate
- Elme's Creek

== F ==
- Ffryes Estate
- Ffryes Pasture
- Follys

== G ==
- Gale's Estate
- Galley Bay
- Gaynor's Estate
- George Byam's Estate
- Giles Blizzard's Estate
- Glanville's Estate
- Goble's Estate
- Grant's Estate
- Gravenor's Estate
- Gray's Belfast
- Guava

== H ==
- Halliday's Mountain
- Harman's Estate
- Hawksbill Plantation
- Hermitage Estate
- Hill House
- Horsford's Estate
- Howard's Estate

== J ==
- Jefferson's Estate
- Jolly Hill
- Jonas
- Judge Blizzard's Estate

== L ==
- La Roche Estate
- Langford's Estate
- Lavington's Estate
- Little Duers
- Long Lane Estate
- Lower Cedar Hill
- Lower Walronds
- Lucas's Estate
- Lynch's Estate
- Lyon's Estate

== M ==
- Manning's Estate
- Matthews
- Mayer's Estate
- Mill Hill
- Millar's Estate
- Montero's Estate
- Morris Looby's Estate
- Morris's Estate
- Mount Pleasant

== N ==
- Nanton's Estate
- New Division
- Nibb's Estate

== O ==
- Olivers
- Orange Valley

== P ==
- Parrys
- Parson's Maul

== R ==
- Ras Freeman
- Richmond's Estate
- Rigby's Estate
- Rooms Estate
- Rose Hill
- Royall's Estate

== S ==
- Sanderson's Estate
- Savannah
- Seaforths
- Sheriff's Estate
- Sherwood's Estate
- Skerretts
- Smith's Estate

== T ==
- The Grange
- The Hope
- The Retreat
- Thibou's Estate
- Thomas's Estate
- Tomlinson House
- Tranquil Vale
- Traumentania

== U ==
- Union Plantation
- Upper Cedar Hill
- Upper Walronds

== W ==
- Watson's Estate
- Weatherills
- Weir's Estate
- Wickham's Estate
- William's Estate
- Willock's Estate
- Windy Hill Estate
- Woods

== Y ==
- Yeamon's Estate
- Yorks
