= Bolans =

Bolans Bolan
- Village
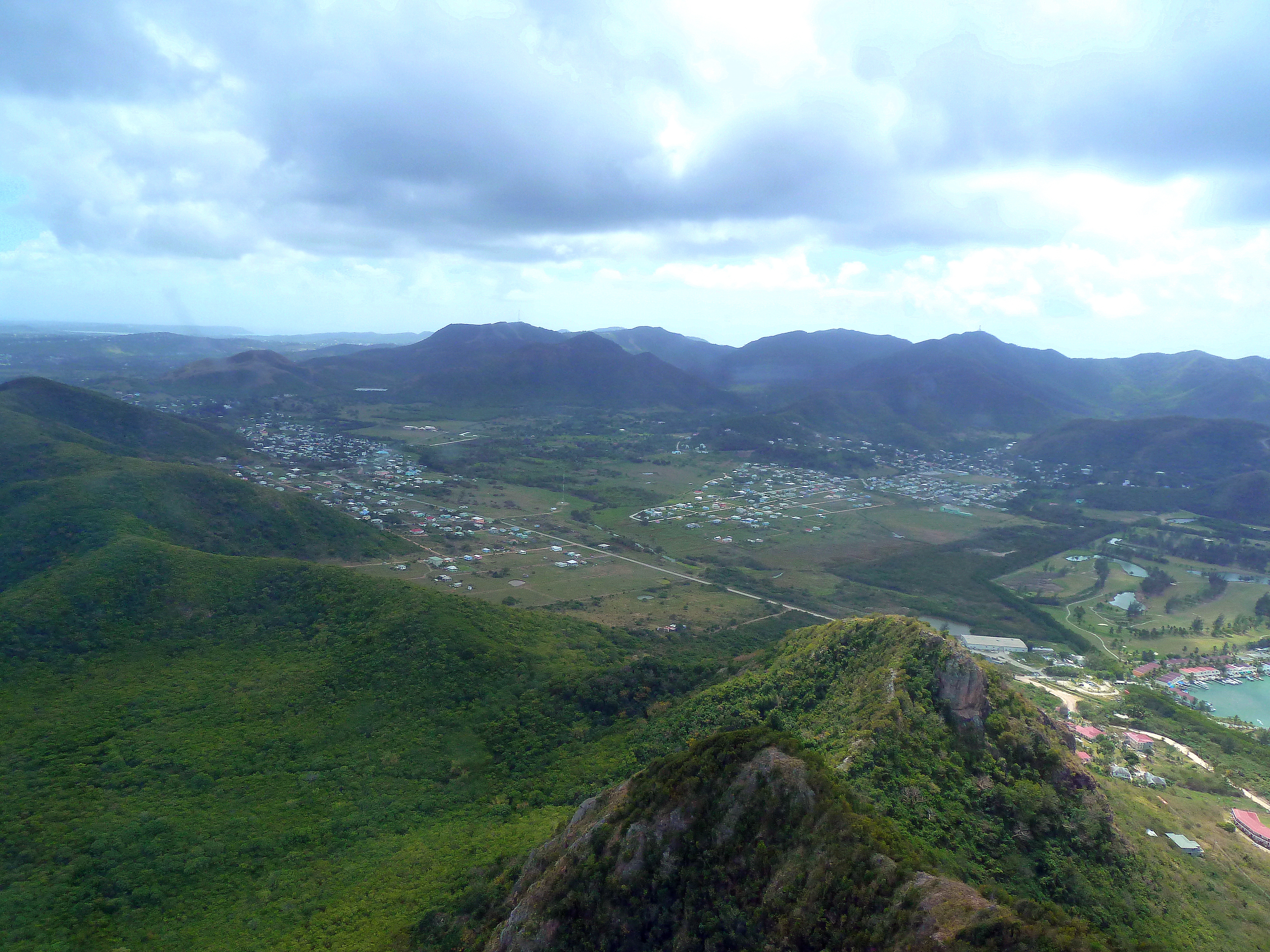
- Jennings (left) and Bolans (right)
- Interactive map of the Bolans main place
- Location within Antigua
- Coordinates: 17°3′57″N 61°52′26″W
- Country: Antigua and Barbuda
- Island: Antigua
- Parish: Saint Mary

Government
  - Type: Village Council (possibly dissolved)
  - MP: Dwayne George

Area
  - Total: 5.45 km^{2} (2.10 sq mi)
- Elevation: 11 m (36 ft)

Population (2011)
  - Total: 2,053
  - Density: 376.7/km^{2} (976/sq mi)
- Time zone: UTC-4 (AST)

Bolans (South Antiguan: Bolan) is the largest settlement in Saint Mary, Antigua and Barbuda. Located south of Jennings on Valley Road, the once agrarian community has since been transformed into the economic centre of Saint Mary, as well as one of the largest tourist destinations in the country in the Jolly Harbour neighbourhood. With a population of 2,053 people in 2011, Bolans is the third largest settlement in the country behind All Saints and St. John's. It borders Jennings and Ebenezer to the northeast and Ffryes to the south.

== Geography ==
Bolans is located in the Montero Plain in the northern area of Saint Mary, close to the Shekerley Mountains. It covers an area of 5.45 square kilometres and was composed of eight enumeration districts as for the 2011 census. There are some notable neighbourhoods in the village, including Jolly Harbour, Jolly Beach, Tottenham, Bolans Hill, Jolly Hill, and many others. Valley Road, the primary route between St. John's and Urlings is the main road of the village, connecting the Jolly Harbour development to the rest of the community.

== History ==
In 1749, what is now Bolans was the site of various sugar plantations operated by enslaved Africans. One of these plantations was owned by John Bolan, which had a windmill and operated until the abolition of slavery in 1833. Following emancipation, this estate was merged into the larger Jolly Hill estate, property of Bertie Entwistle. Before the emergence of the village, Jolly Hill operated closest to what is now the village's centre. An 1829 map shows the present-day village as containing the Jolly Hill, Hermitage, York's, and Tranquil Vale estates. Most of these sites continue to stand, although some, including Jolly Hill, are now in ruins. Sales of land in the Jolly Hill area date back to 1686, with the purchase of 300 acres by Thomas Horsnell. In 1706, Hermitage on the Pearns Point peninsula was home to 16 slaves on 62 acres. York's plantation, dating back to 1670, was originally composed of two smaller estates, Muskito Cove (today's Mosquito Cove) and Bear Gardens. In 1688, York's was 850 acres and home to 78 enslaved Africans.

Following emancipation, buildings began to emerge in the 1850s. Many people in Antigua were opposed to ex-slaves owning land, although planters eventually began to cease these objections following the realization that uncultivated land could be farmed by these people. Hermitage was viewed as a suitable site for ambitious ex-slaves due to its distance from the central sugar depot at Gunthropes. Many ex-slaves used box hand schemes to collectively purchase the land. In the 1856, Bolans was home to 508 people in 123 homes. By 1872, the Jolly Hill estate had been split into about five different holdings, and the estates, which continued to employ people following the abolition of slavery, likely encouraged the creation of small settlements in the area. By the 1880s, a school operated by the Wesleyans was operating in the village.

The post-emancipation history of Bolans formalized the village as one of the new leading settlements on the island. Major decisions in the colony were expected to have at least some consultation with the village's population, and the village eventually received local government in the 1940s following the adoption of the village councils system. In December 1950, the chairman of the elected village council was Clifford Parker. A map from 1957 shows Bolans as being located on the island's light railway used to service sugar plantations. At some point in the 1960s, the nearby village of Roses was abandoned and while the site of Roses itself became a ghost town, Bolans Hill where it stood began to be a site of the village's expansion. In 1970, Bolans had 1,822 people in 441 households. Bolans, the primary village in the St. Mary's South constituency, was a stronghold for the opposition for the 1971 and 1976 general elections, before eventually being swept by the Labour Party in 1980. Before the 1980s, Jolly Harbour was an undeveloped mangrove, although planning for a major development commenced in 1986. In 1991, Bolans had a population of 1,447. While most of the other villages in Saint Mary experienced drastic population losses following independence, Bolans only had moderate losses, with jobs and money brought to the area due to the major dredging and land reclamation work ongoing in Jolly Harbour. By 1995, development in Jolly Harbour was mostly complete, bringing major resorts and foreign investment. Today, Bolans is one of the leading settlements on Antigua, home to both commercial and recreational industries.

== Demographics ==
In 2011, the population of Bolans was counted in eight enumeration districts. Bolans had a population of 2,053 in 2011, being relatively ethnically diverse for national standards, with Africans (86.37 per cent), whites (7.77 per cent), other mixed (2.11 per cent), East Indians (0.93 per cent), other (0.93 per cent), unknown (0.82 per cent), mixed black/white (0.67 per cent), Hispanics (0.26 per cent), and Syrian/Lebanese people (0.15 per cent). The village largely follows national religious trends, being mostly Protestant. The major religious groups in the village are Anglicans (23.42 per cent), Adventists (10.86 per cent), Pentecostalists (10.86 per cent), irreligious people (9.37 per cent), Methodists (8.08 per cent), Roman Catholics (5.97 per cent), and many others. About 70.11 per cent of the population was born in Antigua and Barbuda, slightly above the national average. Other birth places include Guyana (6.28 per cent), Jamaica (6.07 per cent), the United States (3.19 per cent), the United Kingdom (2.73 per cent), and Dominica (2.62 per cent). About 80 per cent of the population were Antiguan and Barbudan citizens. About 13 per cent of Bolans residents have lived abroad at some point in their lives.

Bolans remains one of the most impoverished communities on the island. Tottenham, the most deprived area in the village, is the ninth poorest neighbourhood in the country. Excluding seaside developments such as Jolly Harbour which were not included in the survey, all enumeration districts in the village were considered low income or upper-low income in 2008. Many neighbourhoods in the village had low household computer ownership, including Tottenham, being one of the only communities in the country to have no household computers. In 2011, most homes had wood walls (40.56 per cent), concrete and block walls (37.75 per cent), or wood and concrete walls (14.08 per cent). About 81 per cent of homes had sheet metal roofs. 87 per cent of homes had at least one mobile phone. 5.86 per cent of households had at least one member migrate abroad between 2010 and 2011.

Most people in the village speak South Antiguan Creole. The village is home to two public schools, the S. R. Olivia David Primary School for younger children and the St. Mary's Secondary School for older children.

== Notable people ==
- James Carlisle, former governor-general of Antigua and Barbuda.
- Orden David, LGBTQ activist.
- Gavin Williams, cricketer.
