= St. Mary's South =

Parliamentary constituency in the parish of Saint Mary, Antigua and Barbuda

- Parliamentary constituency for the Parliament of Antigua and Barbuda
- Map of constituencies of Antigua and Barbuda in 2023
- Parish: St. Mary
- Major settlements: Bolans, Crabb Hill, Johnson’s Point, Urlings

Current constituency
- Party: ABLP
- Member: Dwayne George
- District council: Inactive

St. Mary's South is a parliamentary constituency in the parish of Saint Mary, Antigua and Barbuda. A by-election was held in the constituency on 24 October 2023.

== Polling districts ==
St. Mary's South has three polling districts; "A", "B", and "C". Polling District "A" includes Jolly Hill, Bolans, Christian Valley, Willocks, Roses, Orange Valley, Picarts, Ffryes, and Valley Church. Polling District "B" includes Crabs Hill and Johnsons Point. Polling District "C" includes Urlings, Cades Bay, and Brooks.

2023 results for Polling District "A"
Polling Station	Party	Votes
Station 1 (A-C)	ABLP	124
Station 1 (A-C)	UPP	103
Station 1 (A-C)	DNA	4
Station 1 (A-C)	Invalid	0
Station 2 (D-H)	ABLP	156
Station 2 (D-H)	UPP	136
Station 2 (D-H)	DNA	2
Station 2 (D-H)	Invalid	0
Station 3 (I-L)	ABLP	108
Station 3 (I-L)	UPP	84
Station 3 (I-L)	DNA	1
Station 3 (I-L)	Invalid	2
Station 4 (M-R)	ABLP	111
Station 4 (M-R)	UPP	97
Station 4 (M-R)	DNA	1
Station 4 (M-R)	Invalid	1
Station 5 (S-X)	ABLP	158
Station 5 (S-X)	UPP	125
Station 5 (S-X)	DNA	3
Station 5 (S-X)	Invalid	1
Total	Votes	Percentage
UPP	636	52.25%
ABLP	566	46.50%
DNA	11	0.90%
Rejected	4	0.32%
	1,217	100%
Registered Voters	1,635	

2023 results for Polling District "B"
Polling Station	Party	Votes
Station 1 (A-W)	ABLP	139
Station 1 (A-W)	UPP	66
Station 1 (A-W)	DNA	0
Station 1 (A-W)	Invalid	0
Total	Votes	Percentage
ABLP	139	67.80%
UPP	66	32.19%
DNA	0	0.00%
Rejected	0	0.00%
	205	100%
Registered Voters	264	

2023 results for Polling District "C"
Polling Station	Party	Votes
Station 1 (A-J)	ABLP	131
Station 1 (A-J)	UPP	149
Station 1 (A-J)	DNA	0
Station 1 (A-J)	Invalid	0
Station 2 (K-W)	ABLP	99
Station 2 (K-W)	UPP	137
Station 2 (K-W)	DNA	1
Station 2 (K-W)	Invalid	1
Total	Votes	Percentage
UPP	286	55.21%
ABLP	230	44.40%
DNA	1	0.19%
Rejected	1	0.19%
	518	100%
Registered Voters	689	

== Electoral history ==
=== Voting trends ===
Party	1971	1976	1980	1984	1989	1994	1999	2004	2009	2014	2018	2023	2026
ABLP	38.26%	32.88%	60.19%	71.55%	56.06%	45.68%	42.69%	39.04%	40.83%	52.09%	50.08%	44.54%	52.11%
UPP	-	-	-	28.45%	29.87%	51.51%	53.22%	60.96%	58.50%	47.91%	48,43%	54.69%	47.89%
PLM	61.74%	67.12%	37.53%	-	-	-	-	-	-	-	-	-	-
Others	0.00%	0.00%	2.27%	0.00%	14.07%	2.82%	4.08%	0.00%	0.66%	0.00%	0.96%	0.62%	0.00%
Valid	860	1,323	1,452	1,188	1,279	1,561	1,567	1,647	1,805	1,937	1,871	1,935	1,923
Invalid	20	11	5	7	6	4	6	6	8	22	10	5	10
Total	880	1,334	1,457	1,195	1,285	1,565	1,573	1,653	1,813	1,959	1,881	1,940	1,933
Registered	1,453	1,372	1,842	1,948	2,108	2,437	2,607	1,782	2,176	2,131		2,588	2,816
Turnout	60.56%	97.23%	79.10%	61.34%	60.96%	64.22%	60.34%	92.76%	83.32%	91.93%		74.96%	68,64%

=== 2023 by-election ===
On October 24, 2023, a by-election was conducted in the Antiguan seat of St. Mary's South in response to the resignation of Kelvin Simon, the sitting UPP member of parliament, due to challenges to his candidacy. It was Antigua and Barbuda's second election since Prime Minister Gaston Browne emerged victorious in the country's general election in 2023 with a narrow win.

The election was won by the UPP. This was the first by-election held outside of Barbuda since independence in 1981.

== Members of parliament ==
Year	Winner	Party	% Votes
1971	Victor McKay	PLM	61.74%
1976	Victor McKay	PLM	67.12%
1980	Hugh Marshall	ALP	60.19%
1984	Hugh Marshall	ALP	71.55%
1989	Hugh Marshall	ALP	56.06%
1994	Hilson Baptiste	UPP	51.51%
1999	Hilson Baptiste	UPP	53.22%
2004	Hilson Baptiste	UPP	60.96%
2009	Hilson Baptiste	UPP	58.50%
2014	Samantha Marshall	ABLP	52.09%
2018	Samantha Marshall	ABLP	50.35%
2023	Kelvin Simon	UPP	54.69%
2026	Dwayne George	ABLP	52.11%
