= Roses Village =

- Ghost village
- Location within Antigua
- Coordinates: 17°03′28″N 61°52′26″W
- Country: Antigua and Barbuda
- Parish: Saint Mary
- Division: New Division
- Named for: John Rose

Population (1856)
  - Total: 38

Roses Village is a ghost village in Saint Mary, Antigua and Barbuda. A Directorate of Overseas Surveys map from 1959 shows the village as being located on the slopes of Bolans Hill. The present-day site is directly south of Bolans on Alley Drive in the Dark Valley, and abandoned homes continue to stand.

In the 1856 census, Roses Village was mentioned as having a population of 38– twenty-three men and fifteen women. Most of the villagers were leaseholders, and there were a total of eight occupied homes in the community. In 1871 it was ordered that a road be built between Bolans and Roses. In 1912, it was noted that some logging operations were based in the village. In 1916, a village-wide medical examination was held, with 147 people being tallied. In 1954 it was declared that Roses was to be served by the Bolans post office, with mail delivery on Mondays, Wednesdays, and Fridays.

A 1959 map places the village in the Dark Valley, directly south of Bolans on present day Alley Drive, north of Willocks. This survey states that the village was on the side of Bolans Hill as a small cluster of about a dozen houses. The village was located on the banks of a seasonal river that emptied into a salt pond east of Mosquito Cove.

The village was close to the Tranquil Vale sugar estate, which was home to about 57 people in 1833 and was once owned by John Rose, the village's namesake. Sometime before 1829 the area had a cattle-operated mill, likely associated with the sugar estate. The estate's mill tower continues to stand.

Roses Village has been listed on national electoral rolls as part of polling district "A" in St. Mary's South as recently as 2023.
