= Monteros Hill =

Mountain in Antigua and Barbuda

- Location within Antigua and Barbuda

Highest point
- Elevation: 154 m (505 ft)
- Prominence: 101 m (331 ft)
- Coordinates: 17°05′03.21″N 61°52′07.54″W

Geography
- Location: Antigua and Barbuda

Monteros Hill is located in the northern part of Saint Mary, Antigua and Barbuda, overlooking the Montero Plain. It is a forested area near New Division Estate and Seaforths. It has an elevation of 154 m (505 ft) and a prominence of 101 m (331 ft). It is the eleventh tallest peak in the parish and one of the tallest outside of the Shekerley Mountains.
