= Dark Valley (Antigua) =

Valley of Antigua and Barbuda

- Location within Antigua

Geography
- Country: Antigua and Barbuda
- State: Saint Mary
- Coordinates: 17°3′28″N 61°52′25″W

Location
- Interactive map of Dark Valley

Dark Valley is located in the Shekerley Mountains of Saint Mary, Antigua and Barbuda, south of Bolans on Alley Drive. Roses Village was once located in this valley.

The valley is overlooked by Bolans Hill. While Bolans has slowly expanded into the northern regions of the valley, the majority of it is currently uninhabited. The western half of the valley is mostly covered by tropical forest, with some pockets of rough grazing land. The eastern half is mostly used for agricultural purposes. The southern portion of the valley is experiencing deforestation. In the extreme south there is some improved grazing.

The valley has a ghaut that empties into Jolly Harbour.
