= Delano Christopher =

First female Caribbean police commissioner (1950–2024)

- Born: 10 October 1950; Nut Grove, Antigua and Barbuda
- Died: 11 February 2024 (aged 73); Gunthorpes
- Occupation: Police officer
- Employer: Royal Police Force of Antigua and Barbuda
- Known for: first female police commissioner in the Caribbean
- Successor: Gary Nelson

Delano Christopher QPM (10 October 1950 – 11 February 2024) was the first female police commissioner in the Caribbean. She served for 39 years during which she was appointed to lead the Royal Police Force of Antigua and Barbuda in 2005.

== Life ==
Christopher was born in 1950 in Nut Grove in Saint John, Antigua and Barbuda. She went to Greenbay Primary School and attended the Moravian Church.

She was appointed to lead the Royal Police Force of Antigua and Barbuda in 2005. She was the first woman commissioner in the Caribbean. In the following year as part of the 2006 Birthday Honours, Christopher received the Queen's Police Medal in recognition of her service to the Royal Police Force of Antigua and Barbuda.

In 2008 she was sent on vacation leave and almost immediately a new commissioner Gary Nelson was appointed. Nelson was a Canadian and he was given the new job as a result of an inspection by another Canadian police officer, Alphonse Breau, in 2007. She retired having served the police for 39 years. Christopher's replacement's term ended in a court case. The police force belatedly tried to negotiate a contract with Nelson in 2008. When he refused the terms of that contract, he was dismissed and the matter ended in court.

Christopher died at her home in Gunthorpes in 2024. Her funeral in her Moravian church was attended by the police. The leader of the opposition United Progressive Party sent a tribute noting her as a role model for other women to also break glass ceilings. A petition was raised to rename the street where the Police Headquarters is, American Road, after Delano Christopher.
