= Antonio Joseph Camacho =

19th-century Portuguese-Antiguan businessman

Antonio Joseph Camacho (d. 1894) was a nineteenth-century Portuguese-Antiguan businessman and landowner. Originating from Madeira, he arrived on Antigua in the middle of the century, likely as a labourer or adventurer– in contrast to popular belief which holds that he arrived as a poor indentured servant.

Camacho eventually came to establish one of the wealthiest families in the British West Indies, with many of his descendants entering the judiciaries of the islands and Guiana. Camacho was a devout Catholic who helped fund the expansion of the Holy Family Cathedral. His business ventures were centred around A. J. Camacho & Co., which was the second largest landowner in the colony. The first estates he purchased were Bellevue and Briggins before embarking on a landbuying spree. Other estates owned by him at some point included Herberts, Dunnings, Ottos, Langfords, Woods, and Belmont. He was also one of several Portuguse families involved in the liquor business, owning a liquor store at the junction of Long and Market Streets in Downtown St. John's.

On 3 November 1887 the case Camacho v. da Silva was ruled upon in the colonial supreme court, and opposing businessman da Silva was forced to sell his lands outside of Pares. On 11 March 1889 he was mentioned as being a resident of Redcliffe Street.

Camacho had three sons: John, Emmanuel, and Martin, who each took control of different parts of his business upon his death in 1894.
