= Union Plantation, Antigua and Barbuda =

Official historic site of Antigua and Barbuda

Union Plantation
- Location within Antigua and Barbuda
- 17°06′46.4″N 61°51′34.7″W
- Location: Saint John, Antigua and Barbuda

History
- Built: 1678

Historical Site of Antigua and Barbuda

Union Plantation is an official historic site in Saint John, Antigua and Barbuda. It was a sugar plantation established in 1678. The sugar mill tower continues to stand and 208 people were enslaved here at the estate's peak.
