= Hawksbill Plantation =

Official historic site of Antigua and Barbuda

Hawksbill
- Location within Antigua and Barbuda
- 17°06′48.4″N 61°53′53.0″W
- Location: Saint John, Antigua and Barbuda

History
- Built: 1710s

Historical Site of Antigua and Barbuda

Hawksbill is an official historic site in Saint John, Antigua and Barbuda. It was a sugar plantation established in the 1710s. The sugar mill tower continues to stand and 59 people were enslaved here at the time of emancipation.
