= Allen's Estate =

Official historic site of Antigua and Barbuda

Allen's
- Location within Antigua and Barbuda
- 17°03′35.3″N 61°50′32.6″W
- Location: Saint John, Antigua and Barbuda

History
- Built: 1668

Historical Site of Antigua and Barbuda

Allen's is an official historic site in Saint John, Antigua and Barbuda. It was a sugar plantation established in 1668. The sugar mill tower continues to stand. 99 people were enslaved here at the time of emancipation.
