= Nut Grove, St. John's =

Coordinates: 17°06′N 61°51′W

Nut Grove
- Village
- Location within Antigua and Barbuda
- Country: Antigua and Barbuda
- Island: Antigua
- Civil parish: Saint John Parish

Government
  - Type: Village Council (possibly dissolved)

Population (2011)
  - Total: 265
- Time zone: UTC-4 (AST)

Nut Grove is a village in Saint John Parish, Antigua and Barbuda. Delano Christopher was born and brought up here and she went on to be the first woman Police Commissioner in the Caribbean.

== Demographics ==
Nut Grove has one enumeration district, 12700 Nut Grove.

=== Census data (2011) ===
==== Individual ====
Q48 Ethnic	Counts	%
African descendent	254	96.02%
Mixed (Other)	3	1.20%
Hispanic	2	0.80%
Other	4	1.59%
Don't know/Not stated	1	0.40%
Total	265	100.00%

Q49 Religion	Counts	%
Adventist	46	17.53%
Anglican	39	14.74%
Baptist	7	2.79%
Church of God	9	3.59%
Methodist	21	7.97%
Moravian	8	3.19%
Nazarene	2	0.80%
None/no religion	42	15.94%
Pentecostal	21	7.97%
Rastafarian	4	1.59%
Roman Catholic	8	3.19%
Weslyan Holiness	5	1.99%
Other	38	14.34%
Don't know/Not stated	12	4.38%
Total	265	100.00%

Q55 Internet Use	Counts	%
Yes	99	37.45%
No	164	62.15%
Don't know/Not stated	1	0.40%
Total	265	100.00%

Q71 Country of Citizenship 1	Counts	%
Antigua and Barbuda	218	82.47%
Dominica	6	2.39%
Dominican Republic	1	0.40%
Guyana	7	2.79%
Jamaica	31	11.55%
USA	1	0.40%
Total	265	100.00%

Q71 Country of Citizenship 2 (Country of Second Citizenship)	Counts	%
Other Caribbean countries	1	3.57%
Canada	1	3.57%
Dominica	12	39.29%
Dominican Republic	1	3.57%
Guyana	8	28.57%
Jamaica	2	7.14%
Monsterrat	1	3.57%
St. Vincent and the Grenadines	1	3.57%
USA	1	3.57%
Other countries	1	3.57%
Total	30	100.00%
NotApp :	235	

Q61 Lived Overseas	Counts	%
Yes	19	10.11%
No	168	89.33%
Don't know/Not stated	1	0.56%
Total	188	100.00%
NotApp :	77	

Q58. Country of birth	Counts	%
Antigua and Barbuda	188	70.92%
Dominica	17	6.37%
Dominican Republic	2	0.80%
Guyana	16	5.98%
Jamaica	34	12.75%
Monsterrat	1	0.40%
St. Kitts and Nevis	2	0.80%
St. Lucia	1	0.40%
St. Vincent and the Grenadines	1	0.40%
United Kingdom	1	0.40%
USA	2	0.80%
Total	265	100.00%

==== Household ====
There are 79 households in Nut Grove.

Q2 Main Material of outer walls	Counts	%
Concrete	3	3.80%
Concrete/ Blocks	15	18.99%
Wood	48	60.76%
Wood and brick	1	1.27%
Wood and concrete	12	15.19%
Total	79	100.00%

Q3 Main roofing material	Counts	%
Sheet metal	76	96.20%
Shingle (asphalt)	1	1.27%
Shingle (Other)	2	2.53%
Total	79	100.00%

Q4 Year built	Counts	%
Before 1980	5	6.33%
1980–1989	9	11.39%
1990–1999	15	18.99%
2000–2006	9	11.39%
Year 2007	1	1.27%
Year 2009	1	1.27%
Year 2010	1	1.27%
Don't Know/not stated	38	48.10%
Total	79	100.00%

Q5 Type of dwelling	Counts	%
Separate house	65	82.28%
Part of a private house	2	2.53%
Flat/apartment/condo	8	10.13%
Business & dwelling	2	2.53%
Do not know/Not stated	2	2.53%
Total	79	100.00%

Q6 Type of ownership	Counts	%
Owned outright	49	62.03%
Rented Private	25	31.65%
Other (inc. leased, rented Gov., squatted)	3	3.80%
Do not know/Not stated	2	2.53%
Total	79	100.00%

Q23 3a Desktop Computer	Counts	%
Yes	20	25.32%
No	57	72.15%
Not Stated	2	2.53%
Total	79	100.00%

Q23 3b Laptop Computer	Counts	%
Yes	26	32.91%
No	51	64.56%
Not Stated	2	2.53%
Total	79	100.00%

Q11 Garbage disposal	Counts	%
Garbage truck Private	1	1.27%
Garbage truck Public	77	97.47%
Other (inc. burning, burying, compost, dumping)	1	1.27%
Total	79	100.00%

Q7 Land tenure	Counts	%
Leasehold	2	2.53%
Owned/Freehold	46	58.23%
Rented	14	17.72%
Rented free	1	1.27%
Don't know/not stated	16	20.25%
Total	79	100.00%

Q12 Main source of water	Counts	%
Public standpipe	25	31.65%
Public piped into dwelling	44	55.70%
Public piped into dwelling	5	6.33%
Cistern/tank	4	5.06%
Other (inc. private not into dwelling, well/tank, spring/river)	1	1.27%
Total	79	100.00%

Q23 9 Mobile Device	Counts	%
Yes	73	92.41%
No	4	5.06%
Not Stated	2	2.53%
Total	79	100.00%

Q23 10 Radio	Counts	%
Yes	65	82.28%
No	12	15.19%
Not Stated	2	2.53%
Total	79	100.00%

Q24 Motor Vehicles	Counts	%
0	50	63.29%
1	21	26.58%
2	7	8.86%
3	1	1.27%
Total	79	100.00%

Q27 Crime Reported	Counts	%
Yes	4	66.67%
No	2	33.33%
Total	6	100.00%
NotApp :	73	

Q25 4 Internet access	Counts	%
No	51	64.56%
Yes	18	22.78%
Don't know/not declared	10	12.66%
Total	79	100.00%
