= Cades Peak =

Mountain in Antigua and Barbuda

- Location within Antigua and Barbuda

Highest point
- Elevation: 271 m (889 ft)
- Prominence: 40 m (130 ft)
- Coordinates: 17°01′42.91″N 61°50′55.56″W

Geography
- Location: Antigua and Barbuda
- Parent range: Shekerley Mountains

Cades Peak (/keɪdz/) is one of the Shekerley Mountains of Saint Mary, Antigua and Barbuda. It has an elevation of 271 m (889 ft) and 40 m (131 ft) of prominence. It overlooks Cades Bay.
