= Windy Hill Estate =

Official historic site of Antigua and Barbuda

Windy Hill
- Location within Antigua and Barbuda
- 17°01′50.5″N 61°48′39.9″W
- Location: Saint Mary, Antigua and Barbuda

History
- Built: Before 1775

Historical Site of Antigua and Barbuda

Windy Hill is an official historic site in Saint Mary, Antigua and Barbuda. It was a sugar plantation established before 1775 in a highly remote area of the Shekerley Mountains.
