= Boone's Estate =

Official historic site of Antigua and Barbuda

Boone's
- Location within Antigua and Barbuda
- 17°10′0″N 61°50′0″W
- Location: Saint John, Antigua and Barbuda

History
- Built: 1687

Historical Site of Antigua and Barbuda

Boone's is an official historic site in Saint John, Antigua and Barbuda. It was a sugar plantation established in 1687. The sugar mill tower continues to stand and 108 people were enslaved here at the time of emancipation.
