= Halliday's Mountain =

Official historic site of Antigua and Barbuda

- Location within Antigua and Barbuda
- 17°06′56.2″N 61°49′55.9″W
- Location: Saint John, Antigua and Barbuda

History
- Built: 1668

Historical Site of Antigua and Barbuda

Halliday's Mountain is an official historic site in Saint John, Antigua and Barbuda. It was a sugar plantation established in 1668. The sugar mill tower continues to stand and 137 people were enslaved here at its productive peak.
