= Weatherills, Antigua and Barbuda =

Official historic site of Antigua and Barbuda

Weatherills
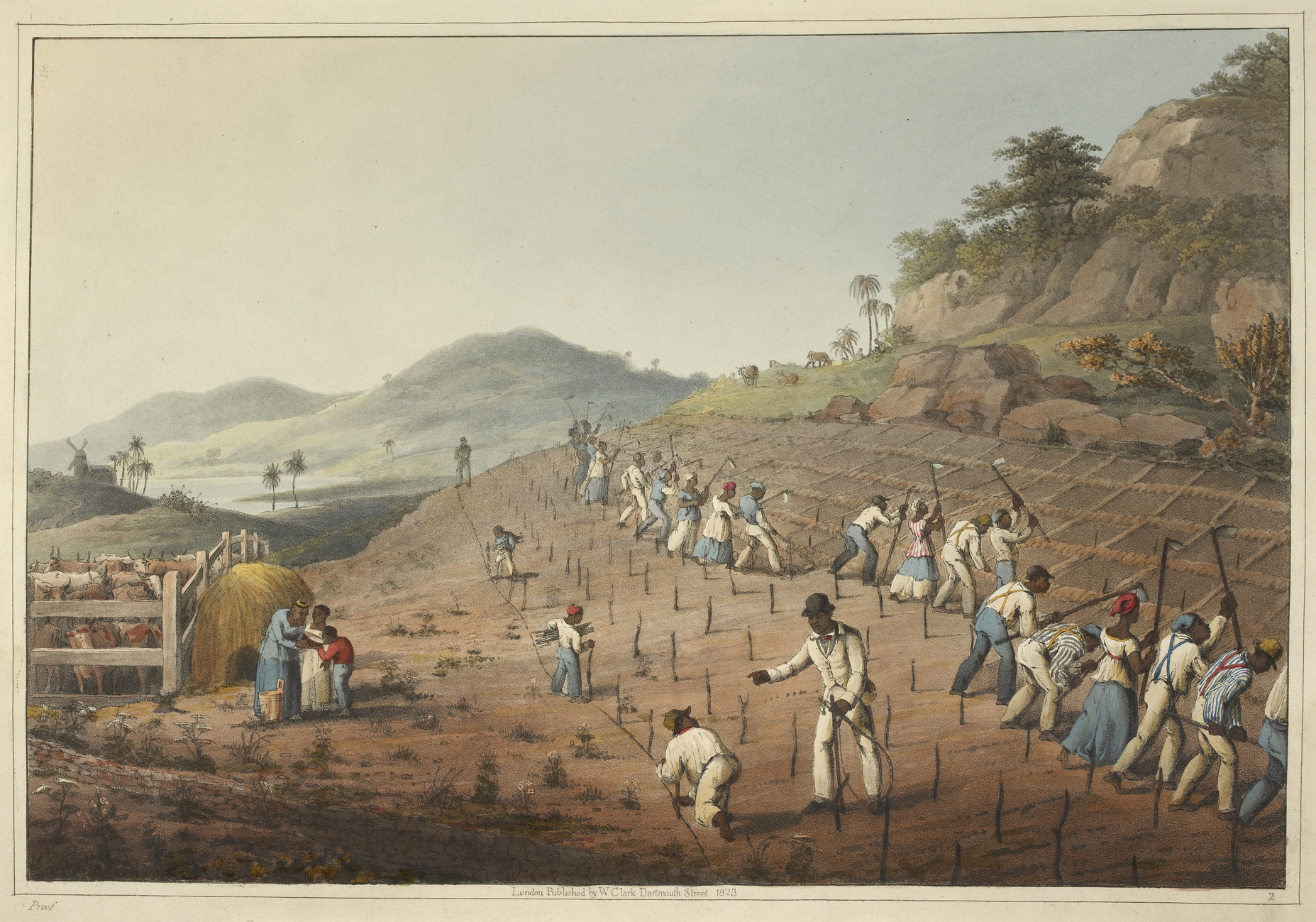
- Weatherills in 1823

- Location within Antigua and Barbuda
- 17°09′38.6″N 61°50′13.2″W
- Location: Saint John, Antigua and Barbuda

History
- Built: 1660s

Historical Site of Antigua and Barbuda

Weatherills is an official historic site in Saint John, Antigua and Barbuda. It was a sugar plantation established in the 1660s. The sugar mill tower continues to stand and 129 people were enslaved here in 1829.
