= Brecknock's Plantation =

Official historic site of Antigua and Barbuda

Brecknock's
- Location within Antigua and Barbuda
- 17°03′29.5″N 61°49′32.2″W
- Location: Saint John, Antigua and Barbuda

History
- Built: 1718

Historical Site of Antigua and Barbuda

Brecknock's is an official historic site in Saint John, Antigua and Barbuda. It was a sugar plantation established in 1718. The sugar mill tower continues to stand and 63 people were enslaved here at the time of emancipation.
