= Briggin's Estate =

Official historic site of Antigua and Barbuda

Briggin's
- Location within Antigua and Barbuda
- 17°06′26.1″N 61°49′53.8″W
- Location: Saint John, Antigua and Barbuda

History
- Built: 1661

Historical Site of Antigua and Barbuda

Briggin's is an official historic site in Saint John, Antigua and Barbuda. It was a sugar plantation established in 1661. The sugar mill tower no longer stands and 49 people were enslaved here at the time of emancipation. It was one of the first estates purchased by Antonio Joseph Camacho.
