= Drew's Hill =

Official historic site of Antigua and Barbuda

- Location within Antigua and Barbuda
- 17°06′26.7″N 61°49′53.6″W
- Location: Saint John, Antigua and Barbuda

History
- Built: 1700s

Historical Site of Antigua and Barbuda

Drew's Hill is an official historic site in Saint John, Antigua and Barbuda. It was a sugar plantation established in the 1700s. The sugar mill tower no longer stands and 144 people were enslaved here at the time of emancipation.
