= Olivers, Antigua and Barbuda =

Official historic site of Antigua and Barbuda

Olivers
- Location within Antigua and Barbuda
- 17°03′56.1″N 61°48′50.4″W
- Location: Saint John, Antigua and Barbuda

History
- Built: 1670s

Historical Site of Antigua and Barbuda

Olivers is an official historic site in Saint John, Antigua and Barbuda. It was a sugar plantation established in the 1670s. The sugar mill tower no longer stands and the estate is now government property.
