= Denfield's Estate =

Official historic site of Antigua and Barbuda

Denfield's
- Location within Antigua and Barbuda
- 17°06′25.7″N 61°51′43.0″W
- Location: Saint John, Antigua and Barbuda

History
- Built: 1777

Historical Site of Antigua and Barbuda

Denfield's is an official historic site in Saint John, Antigua and Barbuda. It was a sugar plantation established in 1777. The sugar mill tower continues to stand and today it is the site of a residential development.
