= Nanton's Estate =

Official historic site of Antigua and Barbuda

Nanton's
- Location within Antigua and Barbuda
- 17°02′05.7″N 61°50′17.7″W
- Location: Saint Mary, Antigua and Barbuda

History
- Built: 1667

Historical Site of Antigua and Barbuda

Nanton's, also known as Young's, is an official historic site in Saint Mary, Antigua and Barbuda. It was a sugar plantation established in 1667. The sugar mill tower continues to stand. 56 people were enslaved here at the time of emancipation.
