= Brook's Estate, Saint Mary =

Official historic site of Antigua and Barbuda

Brook's
- Location within Antigua and Barbuda
- 17°01′21.7″N 61°51′36.7″W
- Location: Saint Mary, Antigua and Barbuda

History
- Built: 1737

Historical Site of Antigua and Barbuda

Brook's is an official historic site in Saint Mary, Antigua and Barbuda. It was a sugar plantation established in 1737. The estate is in ruins although the base of the sugar mill tower remains. Following the abolition of slavery, some peasant cultivation took place at Brook's. Before the 1940s, the estate's house was also used as both a cotton storage facility and as a community centre. The estate overlooks Cades Bay.
