= Mill Hill, Saint Mary =

Official historic site of Antigua and Barbuda

Mill Hill
- Location within Antigua and Barbuda
- 17°02′22.6″N 61°49′15.1″W
- Location: Saint Mary, Antigua and Barbuda

History
- Built: 1680

Historical Site of Antigua and Barbuda

Mill Hill is an official historic site in Saint Mary, Antigua and Barbuda. It was a sugar plantation established in 1680. The sugar mill tower no longer stands and the estate is highly inaccessible due to its location in the rainforests of the Shekerley Mountains. 161 people were enslaved here at the time of emancipation.
