= William's Estate, Antigua and Barbuda =

Official historic site of Antigua and Barbuda

William's Estate
- Location within Antigua and Barbuda
- 17°04′32.7″N 61°49′51.9″W
- Location: Saint John, Antigua and Barbuda

History
- Built: 18th century

Historical Site of Antigua and Barbuda

William's Estate is an official historic site in Saint John, Antigua and Barbuda. It was a sugar plantation established in the 18th century. The sugar mill tower no longer stands and the estate received aid after a major earthquake in the 1850s.
