= Galley Bay =

Official historic site of Antigua and Barbuda

- Location within Antigua and Barbuda
- 17°06′55.6″N 61°53′34.5″W
- Location: Saint John, Antigua and Barbuda

History
- Built: 1750s

Historical Site of Antigua and Barbuda

Galley Bay is an official historic site in Saint John, Antigua and Barbuda. It was a sugar plantation established in the 1750s. The sugar mill tower continues to stand and 180 people were enslaved here at the time of emancipation.
