= Rose Hill, Antigua and Barbuda =

Official historic site of Antigua and Barbuda

Rose Hill
- Location within Antigua and Barbuda
- 17°04′34.0″N 61°48′52.0″W
- Location: Saint John, Antigua and Barbuda

History
- Built: 1750s

Historical Site of Antigua and Barbuda

Rose Hill, also known as Hammersfield, is an official historic site in Saint John, Antigua and Barbuda. It was a sugar plantation established in the 1750s. The sugar mill tower continues to stand and it was located in the Roses Valley.
