= Dunbars, Antigua and Barbuda =

Official historic site of Antigua and Barbuda

Dunbars
- Location within Antigua and Barbuda
- 17°08′44.6″N 61°49′44.8″W
- Location: Saint John, Antigua and Barbuda

History
- Built: 1750s

Historical Site of Antigua and Barbuda

Dunbars is an official historic site in Saint John, Antigua and Barbuda. It was a sugar plantation established in the 1750s. The sugar mill tower no longer stands and 97 people were enslaved here at the time of emancipation.
