= Cooks, Antigua and Barbuda =

Official historic site of Antigua and Barbuda

Cooks
- Location within Antigua and Barbuda
- 17°05′50.3″N 61°51′20.6″W
- Location: Saint John, Antigua and Barbuda

History
- Built: 1700s

Historical Site of Antigua and Barbuda

Cooks is an official historic site in Saint John, Antigua and Barbuda. It was a sugar plantation established in the 1700s. The sugar mill tower continues to stand and 254 people were enslaved here at the time of emancipation. It is also the site of Antigua's main landfill.

== See also ==
- Cooks Creek
