= Douglas's Estate =

Official historic site of Antigua and Barbuda

Douglas's
- Location within Antigua and Barbuda
- 17°01′03.2″N 61°50′27.9″W
- Location: Saint Mary, Antigua and Barbuda

History
- Built: 1682

Historical Site of Antigua and Barbuda

Douglas's Estate, also known as Ravenscroft, is an official historic site in Saint Mary, Antigua and Barbuda. It was a sugar plantation established in 1682. The sugar mill tower no longer stands. At the estate's peak, 350 people were enslaved here.
