= Mount Pleasant, Antigua and Barbuda =

Official historic site of Antigua and Barbuda

Mount Pleasant
- Location within Antigua and Barbuda
- 17°09′19.7″N 61°49′19.2″W
- Location: Saint John, Antigua and Barbuda

History
- Built: 1668

Historical Site of Antigua and Barbuda

Mount Pleasant is an official historic site in Saint John, Antigua and Barbuda. It was a sugar plantation established in 1668. The sugar mill tower continues to stand and 192 people were enslaved here at the estate's peak.
