= Thibou's Estate =

Official historic site of Antigua and Barbuda

Thibou's
- Location within Antigua and Barbuda
- 17°09′29.1″N 61°48′21.5″W
- Location: Saint John, Antigua and Barbuda

History
- Built: 17th century

Historical Site of Antigua and Barbuda

Thibou's is an official historic site in Saint John, Antigua and Barbuda. It was a sugar plantation established in the 17th century. The sugar mill tower continues to stand and 276 people were enslaved here at the time of emancipation.
