= New Division (division) =

Division of Antigua

- Division
- Coordinates: 17°05′N 61°52′W
- Country: Antigua and Barbuda
- Parish: Saint Mary

New Division is a division of Saint Mary, Antigua and Barbuda. It is composed of the flat Montero Plain to the north and the Shekerley Mountains in its southern salient. Major settlements include Jennings and Ebenezer.
