= Smith's Estate, Saint Mary =

Official historic site of Antigua and Barbuda

Smith's
- Location within Antigua and Barbuda
- 17°04′57.3″N 61°51′52.9″W
- Location: Saint Mary, Antigua and Barbuda

History
- Built: 1668

Historical Site of Antigua and Barbuda

Smith's is an official historic site in Saint Mary, Antigua and Barbuda. It was a sugar plantation established in 1668. Today, it is maintained by the family of Robert Hall, a former deputy premier of the Associated State of Antigua. The sugar mill tower no longer stands and the stones from the tower have been used for the construction of a private residence on the Hall Valley Farm. 73 people were enslaved here at the time of emancipation.
