= Belvedere Plantation, Antigua and Barbuda =

Official historic site of Antigua and Barbuda

Belvedere Plantation
- Location within Antigua and Barbuda
- 17°03′53.7″N 61°50′03.1″W
- Location: Saint John, Antigua and Barbuda

History
- Built: 1682

Historical Site of Antigua and Barbuda

Belvedere Plantation is an official historic site in Saint John, Antigua and Barbuda. It was a sugar plantation established in 1682. The sugar mill tower no longer stands and 125 people were enslaved here at the estate's peak.
