= Hill House, Antigua and Barbuda =

Official historic site of Antigua and Barbuda

Hill House
- Location within Antigua and Barbuda
- 17°08′15.0″N 61°51′26.0″W
- Location: Saint John, Antigua and Barbuda

History
- Built: 1750s

Historical Site of Antigua and Barbuda

Hill House is an official historic site in Saint John, Antigua and Barbuda. It was a sugar plantation established in the 1750s. The sugar mill tower continues to stand and it is well known for its view of St. John's Harbour.
