= Blacksmith's Shop, Nelson's Dockyard =

Official historic site of Antigua and Barbuda

Blacksmith's Shop
- The shop in 2026

- Location within Antigua and Barbuda
- 17°00′27.77″N 61°45′57.29″W
- Location: English Harbour

Historical Site of Antigua and Barbuda

The Blacksmith's Shop is a historic site in Nelson's Dockyard, English Harbour. It is one of the Antigua Naval Dockyard and Related Archaeological Sites, a UNSECO World Heritage Site. The building is one of the newest in the dockyard, being constructed following the 1843 earthquake which devastated all regions of the island. Before the abolition of slavery, blacksmiths in the harbour were known to profit off of the branding of slaves. It is a small structure adjacent to the Engineer's Building.
