= Claremont, Antigua and Barbuda =

Official historic site of Antigua and Barbuda

Claremont
- Location within Antigua and Barbuda
- 17°01′30.0″N 61°50′06.6″W
- Location: Saint Mary, Antigua and Barbuda

History
- Built: 1652

Historical Site of Antigua and Barbuda

Claremont is an official historic site in Saint Mary, Antigua and Barbuda. It was a sugar plantation established in 1652, although today it is a neighbourhood in Old Road with a population of 174 as of 2011. The sugar mill tower no longer stands. In 1829, 252 people were enslaved here and at nearby Traumentania.
