= Royall's Estate, Antigua and Barbuda =

Official historic site of Antigua and Barbuda

Royall's
- Location within Antigua and Barbuda
- 17°09′49.6″N 61°48′52.0″W
- Location: Saint John, Antigua and Barbuda

History
- Built: 1637

Historical Site of Antigua and Barbuda

Royall's is an official historic site in Saint John, Antigua and Barbuda. It was a sugar plantation established in 1637. The sugar mill tower continues to stand and 123 people were enslaved here at the estate's peak.
