= Richmond's Estate, Saint Paul =

Official historic site of Antigua and Barbuda

Richmond's
- Location within Antigua and Barbuda
- 17°02′08.1″N 61°47′54.0″W
- Location: Saint Paul, Antigua and Barbuda

History
- Built: 1750s

Historical Site of Antigua and Barbuda

Richmond's is an official historic site in Saint Paul, Antigua and Barbuda. It was a sugar plantation established in the 1750s. The sugar mill tower no longer stands. 298 people were enslaved here and at Howard's at the time of emancipation.
