= Rigby's Estate =

Official historic site of Antigua and Barbuda

Rigby's
- Location within Antigua and Barbuda
- 17°04′54.9″N 61°51′10.6″W
- Location: Saint Mary, Antigua and Barbuda

History
- Built: 1705

Historical Site of Antigua and Barbuda

Rigby's is an official historic site in Saint Mary, Antigua and Barbuda. It was a sugar plantation established in 1705. The sugar mill tower continues to stand. 110 people were enslaved here at the estate's peak.
