= Dunnings =

Rural area in Antigua

Coordinates: 17°04′17.54″N 61°51′15.88″W

Dunnings is a rural area in Saint Mary, Antigua and Barbuda, west of Bendals. The Dunnings Reservoir is located here, which stores over 136,000 cubic metres of water from the Blubber Valley Catchment area. Dunnings was also the site of a former sugar plantation.

In 1856, Dunnings village had a population of 45 (25 males and 20 females) in eleven homes. Dunnings Estate had an additional 24 people in five homes. In the 1870s, Dunnings Estate was owned by Antonio Joseph Camacho of Madeira. In May 1880, a fourth class road was listed as linking Dunnings to Jennings. In November 1881, the Supreme Court of the Leeward Islands issued a ruling on Dunnings Estate, permitting it to be sold to the benefit of Francis B. Kennington. The estate was also known as "Providence". It was auctioned by the Hughes family on 16 March 1883 (along with Lower Gilliards) at the courthouse in St. John's.

On 22 June 1893, the Leeward Islands Gazette noted that in Dunnings, B. B. Gittens owned 16 acres of non-sugarcane cultivation, 75 acres of grazing land, and 149 acres of other land, paying 4 pounds, 10 shillings, and 9 pence of taxes that year.

It is said that the pall bearers at governor Oliver Baldwin's funeral in 1958 were a group of young boys who traveled to Dunnings for mangoes and joined the procession after hearing the Hells Gate steel orchestra nearby.

In June 2025 it was announced that the Antigua Public Utilities Authority planned on expanding the reservoirs at Dunnings and Big Creek.
