= Morris's Estate =

Official historic site of Antigua and Barbuda

Morris's
- Location within Antigua and Barbuda
- 17°01′02.1″N 61°50′58.5″W
- Location: Saint Mary, Antigua and Barbuda

History
- Built: 1750s

Historical Site of Antigua and Barbuda

Morris's is an official historic site in Saint Mary, Antigua and Barbuda. It was a sugar plantation established around 1750. The sugar mill tower continues to stand. 207 people were enslaved here at the time of emancipation.
