= Parrys, Antigua and Barbuda =

Official historic site of Antigua and Barbuda

Parrys
- Location within Antigua and Barbuda
- 17°04′21.2″N 61°45′50.0″W
- Location: Saint Peter, Antigua and Barbuda

History
- Built: 1671

Historical Site of Antigua and Barbuda

Parrys is an official historic site in Saint Peter, Antigua and Barbuda. It was a sugar plantation established in 1671. The sugar mill tower no longer stands. 161 people were enslaved here at the time of emancipation.
