= Demographics of Saint Mary, Antigua and Barbuda =

Saint Mary Parish (Antigua and Barbuda)

Demographics of Saint Mary Parish
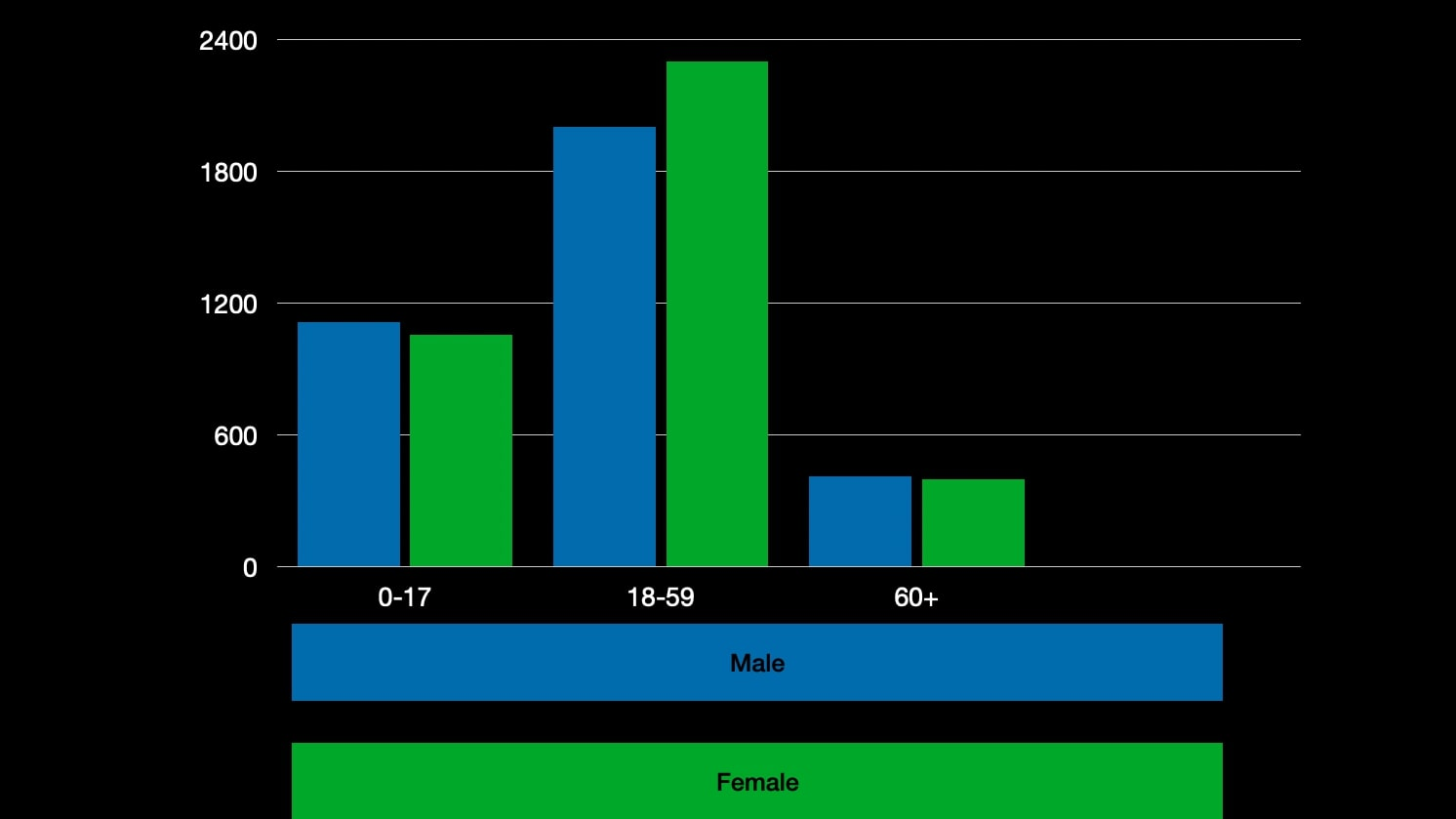
- This image displays a graph of the age groups of Saint Mary Parish, Antigua and Barbuda
- Population: ▲7,341
- Density: 124.24 people per.sq.km (2011 est.)

Nationality
- Major ethnic: Afro–Antiguans and Barbudans (92.13%)
- Minor ethnic: White Antiguans and Barbudans (3.49%)

Language
- Official: English

Demographic features of the population of Saint Mary's include population density, internet access, crime rate, and other aspects of the population.

== Population ==
According to the 2011 census the population of Saint Mary was 7,341.

== Other demographics statistics (2011) ==
=== Census Data (2011) ===
==== Individual ====
Q48 Ethnic	Counts	%
African descendent	6,754	92.13%
Caucasian/White	256	3.49%
East Indian/India	27	0.37%
Mixed (Black/White)	35	0.48%
Mixed (Other)	118	1.61%
Hispanic	55	0.75%
Syrian/Lebanese	3	0.04%
Other	36	0.49%
Don't know/Not stated	46	0.63%
Total	7,331	100.00%

Q49 Religion	Counts	%
Adventist	1,259	17.20%
Anglican	1,606	21.94%
Baptist	144	1.96%
Church of God	211	2.89%
Evangelical	156	2.14%
Jehovah Witness	41	0.56%
Methodist	348	4.76%
Moravian	1,113	15.21%
Nazarene	173	2.37%
None/no religion	478	6.54%
Pentecostal	571	7.81%
Rastafarian	100	1.37%
Roman Catholic	343	4.69%
Weslyan Holiness	351	4.79%
Other	181	2.47%
Don't know/Not stated	243	3.32%
Total	7,319	100.00%
NotApp :	12	

Q55 Internet Use	Counts	%
Yes	3,059	41.73%
No	4,116	56.15%
Don't know/Not stated	155	2.12%
Total	7,331	100.00%

Q58. Country of birth	Counts	%
Africa	21	0.29%
Other Latin or North American countries	7	0.10%
Antigua and Barbuda	5,609	76.51%
Other Caribbean countries	29	0.39%
Canada	51	0.69%
Other Asian countries	19	0.26%
Other European countries	70	0.95%
Dominica	218	2.97%
Dominican Republic	46	0.63%
Guyana	338	4.61%
Jamaica	323	4.41%
Monsterrat	35	0.48%
St. Kitts and Nevis	27	0.37%
St. Lucia	22	0.30%
St. Vincent and the Grenadines	21	0.29%
Trinidad and Tobago	30	0.40%
United Kingdom	119	1.63%
USA	230	3.14%
USVI United States Virgin Islands	53	0.72%
Not Stated	63	0.86%
Total	7,331	100.00%

Q71 Country of Citizenship 1	Counts	%
Antigua and Barbuda	6,225	84.92%
Other Caribbean countries	24	0.33%
Canada	40	0.55%
Other Asian and Middle Eastern countries	13	0.17%
Dominica	126	1.71%
Dominican Republic	25	0.35%
Guyana	256	3.49%
Jamaica	260	3.54%
Monsterrat	22	0.30%
St. Lucia	10	0.13%
St. Vincent and the Grenadines	14	0.19%
Trinidad and Tobago	13	0.17%
United Kingdom	76	1.04%
USA	117	1.60%
Other countries	62	0.85%
Not Stated	49	0.66%
Total	7,331	100.00%

Q71 Country of Citizenship 2 (Country of Second Citizenship)	Counts	%
Other Caribbean countries	71	8.49%
Canada	40	4.82%
Other Asian and Middle Eastern countries	3	0.38%
Dominica	86	10.27%
Dominican Republic	19	2.28%
Guyana	82	9.89%
Jamaica	69	8.24%
Monsterrat	17	2.03%
St. Lucia	14	1.65%
St. Vincent and the Grenadines	13	1.52%
Trinidad and Tobago	16	1.90%
United Kingdom	97	11.66%
USA	258	30.93%
Other countries	50	5.96%
Total	833	100.00%
NotApp :	6,498	

Q77 Training	Counts	%
Yes	1,731	31.23%
No	3,568	64.39%
Don't know/Not stated	243	4.38%
Total	5,542	100.00%
NotApp :	1,789	

Employment status	Counts	%
Employed	3,391	61.19%
Unemployed	341	6.15%
Inactive	1,773	31.99%
Not stated	37	0.67%
Total	5,542	100.00%
NotApp :	1,789	

Q47 Age	Counts	%
0	124	1.69%
1	127	1.73%
2	108	1.47%
3	109	1.48%
4	139	1.90%
5	124	1.69%
6	99	1.35%
7	102	1.40%
8	124	1.69%
9	116	1.58%
10	137	1.87%
11	124	1.69%
12	108	1.47%
13	134	1.83%
14	115	1.57%
15	134	1.83%
16	108	1.47%
17	143	1.94%
18	112	1.53%
19	135	1.84%
20	111	1.51%
21	110	1.50%
22	113	1.54%
23	121	1.66%
24	99	1.35%
25	110	1.50%
26	105	1.43%
27	98	1.34%
28	97	1.33%
29	100	1.37%
30	113	1.54%
31	130	1.77%
32	111	1.51%
33	93	1.27%
34	115	1.57%
35	108	1.47%
36	115	1.57%
37	92	1.25%
38	116	1.58%
39	125	1.70%
40	111	1.51%
41	99	1.35%
42	102	1.40%
43	124	1.69%
44	92	1.25%
45	98	1.34%
46	125	1.70%
47	113	1.54%
48	100	1.37%
49	102	1.40%
50	99	1.35%
51	110	1.50%
52	77	1.05%
53	77	1.05%
54	94	1.28%
55	81	1.11%
56	74	1.01%
57	77	1.05%
58	64	0.88%
59	55	0.75%
60	64	0.88%
61	63	0.86%
62	44	0.61%
63	50	0.68%
64	32	0.43%
65	43	0.59%
66	42	0.58%
67	35	0.48%
68	38	0.52%
69	38	0.52%
70	38	0.52%
71	24	0.33%
72	34	0.46%
73	14	0.19%
74	30	0.40%
75-79	96	1.31%
80-84	91	1.24%
85-89	50	0.68%
90 and over	27	0.37%
Total	7,331	100.00%

==== Household ====
There are 2,512 households in Saint Mary Parish.

Q4 Year built	Counts	%
Before 1980	283	11.27%
1980 - 1989	338	13.46%
1990 - 1999	549	21.86%
2000 - 2006	366	14.57%
Year 2007	51	2.03%
Year 2008	41	1.63%
Year 2009	45	1.79%
Year 2010	58	2.31%
Don't Know/not stated	781	31.09%
Total	2,512	100.00%

Q9 Insurance (Contents)	Counts	%
Yes	248	9.87%
Yes, partially	65	2.59%
No	1,781	70.90%
Don't know/ Not stated	418	16.64%
Total	2,512	100.00%

Q23 1 Air conditioner	Counts	%
Yes	268	10.67%
No	2,243	89.29%
Not Stated	1	0.04%
Total	2,512	100.00%

Q23 3b Laptop Computer	Counts	%
Yes	749	29.82%
No	1,762	70.14%
Not Stated	1	0.04%
Total	2,512	100.00%

Q23 3a Desktop Computer	Counts	%
Yes	589	23.45%
No	1,922	76.51%
Not Stated	1	0.04%
Total	2,512	100.00%

Q11 Garbage disposal	Counts	%
Garbage truck Private	115	4.58%
Garbage truck Public	2,335	92.95%
Other (inc. burning, burying, compost, dumping)	32	1.27%
Don't know/Not stated	30	1.19%
Total	2,512	100.00%

Q23 9 Mobile	Counts	%
Yes	2,140	85.19%
No	371	14.77%
Not Stated	1	0.04%
Total	2,512	100.00%

Q23 10 Radio	Counts	%
Yes	1,719	68.43%
No	792	31.53%
Not Stated	1	0.04%
Total	2,512	100.00%

Q24 Motor Vehicles	Counts	%
0	1,105	47.30%
1	854	36.56%
2	282	12.07%
3	56	2.40%
4 or more	39	1.67%
Total	2,336	100.00%
Missing :	176	

Q25 4 Internet access	Counts	%
No	1,431	56.97%
Yes	705	28.07%
Don't know/not declared	376	14.97%
Total	2,512	100.00%

== See also ==
Demographics of Antigua and Barbuda
