= Cotton Garden =

Official historic site of Antigua and Barbuda

- Location within Antigua and Barbuda
- 17°06′28.0″N 61°46′05.1″W
- Location: Saint Peter, Antigua and Barbuda

History
- Built: 1698

Historical Site of Antigua and Barbuda

Cotton Garden is an official historic site in Saint Peter, Antigua and Barbuda. It was a sugar plantation established in 1698. The sugar mill tower continues to stand. 146 people were enslaved here at the time of emancipation.
