= Ffryes Pasture =

Official historic site of Antigua and Barbuda

- Location within Antigua and Barbuda
- 17°02′13.0″N 61°44′46.7″W
- Location: Saint Paul, Antigua and Barbuda

History
- Built: 1878

Historical Site of Antigua and Barbuda

Ffryes Pasture is an official historic site in Saint Paul, Antigua and Barbuda. It was a sugar plantation established in 1878. The sugar mill tower no longer stands. No persons were ever enslaved here and the estate was disestablished by 1951.
