= Millar's Estate =

Official historic site of Antigua and Barbuda

Millar's
- Location within Antigua and Barbuda
- 17°08′04.0″N 61°47′22.0″W
- Location: Saint George, Antigua and Barbuda

History
- Built: 1750s

Historical Site of Antigua and Barbuda

Millar's is an official historic site in Saint George, Antigua and Barbuda. It was a sugar plantation established in the 1750s. The sugar mill tower continues to stand. 196 people were enslaved here at the time of emancipation. It is visible from the V. C. Bird International Airport.
