= Barnacle Point =

Official historic site of Antigua and Barbuda

- Location within Antigua and Barbuda
- 17°08′29.9″N 61°46′23.8″W
- Location: Saint George, Antigua and Barbuda

History
- Built: 1750s

Historical Site of Antigua and Barbuda

Barnacle Point is an official historic site in Saint George, Antigua and Barbuda. It was a sugar plantation established in the 1750s. The sugar mill tower no longer stands and the site has since been repurposed. The estate's owners were compensated 900 pounds for the emancipation of slaves.
