= Judge Blizzard's Estate =

Official historic site of Antigua and Barbuda

- Location within Antigua and Barbuda
- 17°08′51.3″N 61°48′34.1″W
- Location: Saint George, Antigua and Barbuda

History
- Built: 1750s

Historical Site of Antigua and Barbuda

Judge Blizzard's Estate is an official historic site in Saint George, Antigua and Barbuda. It was a sugar plantation established in the 1750s. The sugar mill tower continues to stand. 217 people were enslaved here at the time of emancipation.
