= Royal Police Force of Antigua and Barbuda =

Police Force

Agency overview
- Employees: 350
- Annual budget: $665,464 XCD (2022)

Jurisdictional structure
- Operations jurisdiction: Antigua and Barbuda
- Governing body: Ministry of Legal Affairs, Public Safety, Immigration and Labour

Website
- https://mpsl.gov.ag/departments/police/

The Royal Police Force of Antigua and Barbuda is the law enforcement agency for Antigua and Barbuda. The Commissioner in 2017 was Atlee Rodney. The force has 350 officers.

Law enforcement in Antigua and Barbuda is primarily carried out by the 350-strong Royal Police Force of Antigua and Barbuda. Additionally, the 185-strong Antigua and Barbuda Defence Force may act as Military Aid to the Civil Power.

== History ==
In 2005, Delano Christopher became the first woman to be the Commissioner. A September 2026 bill has proposed renaming the agency.

== Ranks ==
Antigua and Barbuda Police ranks and insignia
Rank (2017-Present)	Commissioner	Deputy commissioner	Assistant commissioner	Superintendent	Assistant superintendent	Inspector	Senior sergeant	Sergeant	Corporal	Constable
Epaulette insignia										
Rank (Before 2017)	Commissioner	Deputy commissioner	Assistant commissioner	Superintendent	Assistant superintendent	Inspector	Senior sergeant	Sergeant	Corporal	Constable
Epaulette insignia										

== Departments ==
- Royal Police Force of Antigua and Barbuda
  - Special Service Unit
  - Criminal Investigation Department
    - General CID
    - Special Victims Unit
    - Serious Crimes Unit
    - Proceeds of Crime Unit
    - Criminal Records Office
    - Narcotics
    - Forensic Evidence and Recovery unit
    - Youth Intervention Unit
  - Antigua and Barbuda fire brigade
    - Coolidge Fire Station
    - St. John's Fire Station
    - All Saints Fire Station
    - Johnsons Point Fire Station
    - Barbuda Fire Station
  - Human Resource Department
  - K-9 unit
  - Office of Professional Standard
  - Sir Wright F. George Police Academy
  - Strategic Communication
  - Traffic Department

== Divisions ==
Each police station covers a service district.

- Royal Police Force of Antigua and Barbuda
  - A Division
    - St. John’s Police Station
    - Gray’s Farm Police Station
    - Langsford Police Station
    - West Bus Station Outpost
    - Heritage Quay Outpost
  - B Division
    - Coolidge Police Station
    - Parham Police Station
    - Willikies Police Station
    - Freetown Police Station
    - Airport Post
  - C Division
    - All Saints Police Station
    - Liberta Police Station
    - Dockyard Police Station
  - D Division
    - Bolans Police Station
    - Johnson's Point Police Station
    - Barbuda Police Station
