= Guava (Barbuda) =

Official historic site of Antigua and Barbuda

- Location within Antigua and Barbuda
- 17°36′55.66″N 61°49′03.44″W
- Location: Midlands, Barbuda

Historical Site of Antigua and Barbuda

Guava is a historic site near Codrington, Barbuda. The site was likely the location of an Indigenous settlement. Since colonization and up to the present day, the area has been primarily used for agricultural purposes. In the late 18th century, Guava was the site of a large plantation that extended into the Meadow area. The government has proposed building an animal sanctuary here. It is located close to the Burton–Nibbs International Airport.
