= Gravenor's Estate =

Official historic site of Antigua and Barbuda

Gravenor's
- Location within Antigua and Barbuda
- 17°09′15.1″N 61°48′13.1″W
- Location: Saint George, Antigua and Barbuda

History
- Built: 1671

Historical Site of Antigua and Barbuda

Gravenor's is an official historic site in Saint George, Antigua and Barbuda. It was a sugar plantation established in 1671. The sugar mill tower continues to stand. 53 people were enslaved here in 1829.
