= Woods, Antigua and Barbuda =

Official historic site of Antigua and Barbuda

Woods
- Location within Antigua and Barbuda
- 17°08′08.7″N 61°49′52.6″W
- Location: Saint John, Antigua and Barbuda

History
- Built: 1671

Historical Site of Antigua and Barbuda

Woods is an official historic site in Saint John, Antigua and Barbuda. It was a sugar plantation established in 1671. The sugar mill tower continues to stand and 190 people were enslaved here at the time of emancipation.
