= New Division (estate) =

Official historic site of Antigua and Barbuda

- Location within Antigua and Barbuda
- 17°05′10.4″N 61°52′28.8″W
- Location: Saint Mary, Antigua and Barbuda

History
- Built: 1678

Historical Site of Antigua and Barbuda

New Division is an official historic site in Saint Mary, Antigua and Barbuda. It was a sugar plantation established in 1678. The sugar mill tower continues to stand. 309 people were enslaved here at the time of emancipation.
