= Gray's Belfast =

Official historic site of Antigua and Barbuda

- Location within Antigua and Barbuda
- 17°04′31.64″N 61°42′29.51″W
- Location: Saint Philip, Antigua and Barbuda

History
- Built: 1678

Historical Site of Antigua and Barbuda

Gray's Belfast, also known as Lambert Hall, is an official historic site in Saint Philip, Antigua and Barbuda. It was a sugar plantation established in 1678. The sugar mill tower continues to stand. It likely shared facilities with nearby Comfort Hall where cane was crushed. 152 people were enslaved here at the time of emancipation.
