= Cotton New Works =

Official historic site of Antigua and Barbuda

- Location within Antigua and Barbuda
- 17°06′28.3″N 61°44′53.2″W
- Location: Saint Peter, Antigua and Barbuda

History
- Built: 1698

Historical Site of Antigua and Barbuda

Cotton New Works is an official historic site in Saint Peter, Antigua and Barbuda. It was a sugar plantation established in 1698. The sugar mill tower was one of the only in the Caribbean to be made of wood. 137 people were enslaved here at the time of emancipation.
