= List of parishes of Antigua and Barbuda by Human Development Index =

Map of the parishes and dependencies by Human Development Index in 2023 0.856 – 0.860 0.846 – 0.855 0.831 – 0.845 0.824 – 0.830

Below is a list of parishes and dependencies of Antigua and Barbuda by Human Development Index, as of 2023, which is a comparative measure of life expectancy, education, standard of living, and overall well-being of the residents of each of the areas. All parishes and dependencies have very high human development (a value at or above 0.800).

== List ==
Rank	Parish or dependency	HDI (2023)
Very High Human Development
1	Saint George	0.860
-	Saint John (rural)	0.857
-	Antigua and Barbuda (average)	0.851
2	Saint Peter	0.850
3	Saint John (parish-wide)	0.848
4	Saint Paul	0.844
5	Saint Mary	0.843
6	Saint Philip	0.839
-	St. John's (city)	0.835
7	Barbuda	0.824
