= Yeamon's Estate =

Official historic site of Antigua and Barbuda

Yeamon's
- Location within Antigua and Barbuda
- 17°03′50.4″N 61°45′53.1″W
- Location: Saint Peter, Antigua and Barbuda

History
- Built: 1718

Historical Site of Antigua and Barbuda

Yeamon's is an official historic site in Saint Peter, Antigua and Barbuda. It was a sugar plantation established in 1718. The sugar mill tower continues to stand. 110 people were enslaved here in 1829.
