= Cochran's Estate, Saint Peter =

Official historic site of Antigua and Barbuda

Cochran's
- Location within Antigua and Barbuda
- 17°02′23.6″N 61°45′18.7″W
- Location: Saint Peter, Antigua and Barbuda

History
- Built: 1697

Historical Site of Antigua and Barbuda

Cochran's is an official historic site in Saint Peter, Antigua and Barbuda. It was a sugar plantation established in 1697. The sugar mill tower continues to stand. 306 people were enslaved here in 1829.
