= Traumentania =

Official historic site of Antigua and Barbuda

- Location within Antigua and Barbuda
- 17°01′41.3″N 61°50′27.9″W
- Location: Saint Mary, Antigua and Barbuda

History
- Built: 1720

National Cultural Heritage of Antigua and Barbuda

Traumentania is an official historic site and former sugar estate in Saint Mary, Antigua and Barbuda. It is located on Fig Tree Drive, south of John Hughes. The area that is now Traumentania was purchased in 1711 by Nathaniel Crump. The estate changed hands various times, once owned by the Codrington family of Barbuda. In 1829, 252 people were enslaved in Traumentania and the nearby Claremont estate. In 1856, Traumentania had a population of ten, all living in one house. A map from 1957 shows a now-defunct starch factory in Traumentania. The sugar mill in Traumentania continues to stand.
