= Savannah, Antigua and Barbuda =

Official historic site of Antigua and Barbuda

Savannah
- Location within Antigua and Barbuda
- 17°01′09.9″N 61°45′43.3″W
- Location: Saint Paul, Antigua and Barbuda

History
- Built: 1679

Historical Site of Antigua and Barbuda

Savannah is an official historic site in Saint Paul, Antigua and Barbuda. It was a sugar plantation established in 1679. The sugar mill tower continues to stand. 218 people were enslaved here at the time of emancipation and it is one of the oldest estates on the island.
