= Jonas, Antigua and Barbuda =

Official historic site of Antigua and Barbuda

Jonas
- Location within Antigua and Barbuda
- 17°04′31.3″N 61°47′12.9″W
- Location: Saint Peter, Antigua and Barbuda

History
- Built: 1750s

Historical Site of Antigua and Barbuda

Jonas is an official historic site in Saint Peter, Antigua and Barbuda. It was a sugar plantation established in the 1750s. The sugar mill tower continues to stand. 150 people were enslaved here in 1829.
