= Hermitage Bay, Antigua and Barbuda =

Official historic site of Antigua and Barbuda

Hermitage
- Location within Antigua and Barbuda
- 17°05′18.3″N 61°53′14.3″W
- Location: Saint Mary, Antigua and Barbuda

History
- Built: 1706

Historical Site of Antigua and Barbuda

Hermitage is an official historic site in Saint Mary, Antigua and Barbuda. It was a sugar plantation established in 1706. The sugar mill tower continues to stand. At the estate's peak, 107 people were enslaved here.
