= Upper Cedar Hill =

Official historic site of Antigua and Barbuda

- Location within Antigua and Barbuda
- 17°05′27.9″N 61°46′32.1″W
- Location: Saint Peter, Antigua and Barbuda

History
- Built: 1660

Historical Site of Antigua and Barbuda

Upper Cedar Hill is an official historic site in Saint Peter, Antigua and Barbuda. It was a sugar plantation established in 1660. The estate overlooked Parham Harbour. 154 people were enslaved here in 1829.
