= Date Hill =

Official historic site of Antigua and Barbuda

- Location within Antigua and Barbuda
- 17°08′41.7″N 61°48′11.6″W
- Location: Saint George, Antigua and Barbuda

History
- Built: 18th century

Historical Site of Antigua and Barbuda

Date Hill is an official historic site in Saint George, Antigua and Barbuda. It was a sugar plantation established in the 18th century. The sugar mill tower continues to stand. In 1829 the estate covered 132 acres.
