= Sanderson's Estate =

Official historic site of Antigua and Barbuda

Sanderson's
- Location within Antigua and Barbuda
- 17°04′26.4″N 61°46′46.1″W
- Location: Saint Peter, Antigua and Barbuda

History
- Built: 1762

Historical Site of Antigua and Barbuda

Sanderson's is an official historic site in Saint Peter, Antigua and Barbuda. It was a sugar plantation established in 1762. The sugar mill tower no longer stands. 319 people were enslaved here and at Osborne's at the time of emancipation.
