= Big Duers =

Official historic site of Antigua and Barbuda

- Location within Antigua and Barbuda
- 17°04′05.9″N 61°46′19.2″W
- Location: Saint Peter, Antigua and Barbuda

History
- Built: 1680

Historical Site of Antigua and Barbuda

Big Duers is an official historic site in Saint Peter, Antigua and Barbuda. It was a sugar plantation established in 1680. The sugar mill tower no longer stands and much of the site was damaged in an earthquake. 219 people were enslaved here in 1829.
