= Sherwood's Estate =

Official historic site of Antigua and Barbuda

Sherwood's
- Location within Antigua and Barbuda
- 17°06′03.0″N 61°48′01.9″W
- Location: Saint George, Antigua and Barbuda

History
- Built: 1725

Historical Site of Antigua and Barbuda

Sherwood's is an official historic site in Saint George, Antigua and Barbuda. It was a sugar plantation established in 1725. The sugar mill tower no longer stands. The government is currently in a land dispute with some nearby residents.
