= Gale's Estate =

Official historic site of Antigua and Barbuda

Gale's
- Location within Antigua and Barbuda
- 17°02′10.4″N 61°46′49.9″W
- Location: Saint Paul, Antigua and Barbuda

History
- Built: 1740

Historical Site of Antigua and Barbuda

Gale's is an official historic site in Saint Paul, Antigua and Barbuda. It was a sugar plantation established in 1740. The sugar mill tower continues to stand. The estate once covered 300 acres.
