= Brook's Estate, Saint Peter =

Official historic site of Antigua and Barbuda

Brook's
- Location within Antigua and Barbuda
- 17°04′08.7″N 61°46′52.3″W
- Location: Saint Peter, Antigua and Barbuda

History
- Built: 1888

Historical Site of Antigua and Barbuda

Brook's is an official historic site in Saint Peter, Antigua and Barbuda. It was a sugar plantation established in 1888 and disestablished between 1927 and 1928. No people were enslaved here and the estate eventually became crown land.
