= Demographics of Saint John, Antigua and Barbuda =

Demographics of Parish of Saint John
- Population: 51,129

Nationality
- Major ethnic: Afro–Antiguans and Barbudans (84.54%)
- Minor ethnic: Mixed (Other) (4.45%)

Saint John is the most populous parish in the country of Antigua and Barbuda, accounting for the majority of the country's population.

== Tables ==
Q48 Ethnic	Counts	%
African descendent	43,227	84.54%
Caucasian/White	712	1.39%
East Indian/India	754	1.47%
Mixed (Black/White)	488	0.95%
Mixed (Other)	2,277	4.45%
Hispanic	2,052	4.01%
Syrian/Lebanese	530	1.04%
Other	601	1.18%
Don't know/Not stated	488	0.95%
Total	51,129	100.00%

Q49 Religion	Counts	%
Adventist	5,625	11.09%
Anglican	8,127	16.03%
Baptist	1,910	3.77%
Church of God	2,444	4.82%
Evangelical	1,354	2.67%
Jehovah Witness	670	1.32%
Methodist	2,296	4.53%
Moravian	3,700	7.30%
Nazarene	1,008	1.99%
None/no religion	3,203	6.32%
Pentecostal	7,053	13.91%
Rastafarian	564	1.11%
Roman Catholic	5,119	10.10%
Weslyan Holiness	1,491	2.94%
Other	3,542	6.99%
Don't know/Not stated	2,594	5.12%
Total	50,700	100.00%
NotApp :	429	

Q58. Country of birth	Counts	%
Africa	230	0.45%
Other Latin or North American countries	110	0.21%
Antigua and Barbuda	32,438	63.44%
Other Caribbean countries	538	1.05%
Canada	209	0.41%
Other Asian countries	315	0.62%
Other European countries	144	0.28%
Dominica	2,705	5.29%
Dominican Republic	1,831	3.58%
Guyana	4,347	8.50%
Jamaica	3,112	6.09%
Monsterrat	474	0.93%
St. Kitts and Nevis	228	0.45%
St. Lucia	398	0.78%
St. Vincent and the Grenadines	472	0.92%
Syria	293	0.57%
Trinidad and Tobago	352	0.69%
United Kingdom	424	0.83%
USA	1,510	2.95%
USVI United States Virgin Islands	201	0.39%
Not Stated	796	1.56%
Total	51,129	100.00%

Q71 Country of Citizenship 1	Counts	%
Antigua and Barbuda	39,845	77.93%
Other Caribbean countries	382	0.75%
Canada	118	0.23%
Other Asian and Middle Eastern countries	365	0.71%
Dominica	1,307	2.56%
Dominican Republic	1,198	2.34%
Guyana	2,724	5.33%
Jamaica	2,363	4.62%
Monsterrat	185	0.36%
St. Lucia	236	0.46%
St. Vincent and the Grenadines	216	0.42%
Trinidad and Tobago	142	0.28%
United Kingdom	213	0.42%
USA	894	1.75%
Other countries	328	0.64%
Not Stated	613	1.20%
Total	51,129	100.00%

Q71 Country of Citizenship 2	Counts	%
Other Caribbean countries	534	6.26%
Canada	274	3.21%
Other Asian and Middle Eastern countries	219	2.57%
Dominica	1,421	16.66%
Dominican Republic	631	7.40%
Guyana	1,593	18.67%
Jamaica	755	8.85%
Monsterrat	267	3.13%
St. Lucia	162	1.90%
St. Vincent and the Grenadines	255	2.99%
Trinidad and Tobago	221	2.59%
United Kingdom	519	6.09%
USA	1,424	16.70%
Other countries	242	2.84%
Not Stated	11	0.13%
Total	8,530	100.00%
NotApp :	42,599	
