= Seaforths, Antigua and Barbuda =

Official historic site of Antigua and Barbuda

Seaforths
- Location within Antigua and Barbuda
- 17°05′34.2″N 61°52′16.9″W
- Location: Saint Mary, Antigua and Barbuda

History
- Built: 1737

Historical Site of Antigua and Barbuda

Seaforths is an official historic site in Saint Mary, Antigua and Barbuda. It was a sugar plantation established in 1737. The sugar mill tower no longer stands. 242 people were enslaved here at the estate's peak in 1780.
