= City Centre, St. John's =

City Centre
- Major Division/Area
- Country: Antigua and Barbuda
- Parish: Saint John

Population (2011)
  - Total: 2,073
- Time zone: UTC-4 (AST)

City Centre is a Major Division/Area within the city of St. John's, Antigua and Barbuda.

== Demographics ==
City Centre has 9 enumeration districts. The major division number for City Centre is 10.

As of 2001 the major division has a living condition index of 13.69.

- 10100 Buckley's St. (Harbour)
- 10200 Buckley's St. (Central)
- 10300 Buckley's St. (South)
- 10400 Federation Rd. (North)
- 10500 Cooks Hill Rd
- 10600 Federation Rd. (South)
- 10700 Gray Hill West
- 10800 Green Bay Extension
- 10900 George St. (South)

Religion
Q49 Religion	Counts	%
Adventist	169	8.14%
Anglican	330	15.93%
Baptist	26	1.27%
Church of God	115	5.55%
Evangelical	54	2.60%
Jehovah Witness	14	0.66%
Methodist	84	4.07%
Moravian	290	13.99%
Nazarene	54	2.60%
None/no religion	197	9.52%
Pentecostal	240	11.60%
Rastafarian	20	0.97%
Roman Catholic	143	6.92%
Weslyan Holiness	31	1.48%
Other	137	6.62%
Don't know/Not stated	168	8.09%
Total	2,071	100.00%
NotApp :	2	

Ethnic
Q48 Ethnic	Counts	%
African descendent	1,839	88.71%
Caucasian/White	1	0.05%
East Indian/India	11	0.51%
Mixed (Other)	46	2.24%
Hispanic	150	7.22%
Other	7	0.36%
Don't know/Not stated	19	0.92%
Total	2,073	100.00%

Country of birth
Q58. Country of birth	Counts	%
Antigua and Barbuda	1,509	72.80%
Other Caribbean countries	8	0.41%
Canada	4	0.20%
Dominica	106	5.13%
Dominican Republic	133	6.41%
Guyana	100	4.83%
Jamaica	111	5.34%
Monsterrat	33	1.58%
St. Kitts and Nevis	2	0.10%
St. Lucia	16	0.76%
St. Vincent and the Grenadines	4	0.20%
Trinidad and Tobago	1	0.05%
USA	26	1.27%
USVI United States Virgin Islands	8	0.41%
Not Stated	11	0.51%
Total	2,073	100.00%

Country of Citizenship
Q71 Country of Citizenship 1	Counts	%
Antigua and Barbuda	1,703	82.16%
Other Caribbean countries	5	0.25%
Dominica	70	3.36%
Dominican Republic	91	4.37%
Guyana	71	3.41%
Jamaica	96	4.63%
Monsterrat	8	0.41%
St. Lucia	8	0.41%
St. Vincent and the Grenadines	3	0.15%
United Kingdom	1	0.05%
USA	8	0.41%
Other countries	1	0.05%
Not Stated	7	0.36%
Total	2,073	100.00%

Country of Second/Dual Citizenship
Q71 Country of Citizenship 2 (Country of Second/Dual Citizenship)	Counts	%
Other Caribbean countries	14	6.34%
Canada	4	1.95%
Dominica	37	17.07%
Dominican Republic	46	21.46%
Guyana	26	12.20%
Jamaica	16	7.32%
Monsterrat	20	9.27%
St. Lucia	6	2.93%
Trinidad and Tobago	1	0.49%
United Kingdom	2	0.98%
USA	41	19.02%
Other countries	2	0.98%
Total	216	100.00%
NotApp :	1,857	
