= Nibb's Estate =

Official historic site of Antigua and Barbuda

Nibb's
- Location within Antigua and Barbuda
- 17°09′16.9″N 61°47′58.2″W
- Location: Saint George, Antigua and Barbuda

History
- Built: 1671

Historical Site of Antigua and Barbuda

Nibb's is an official historic site in Saint George, Antigua and Barbuda. It was a sugar plantation established in 1671. The sugar mill tower continues to stand. 135 people were enslaved here at the time of emancipation.
