= Little Duers =

Official historic site of Antigua and Barbuda

- Location within Antigua and Barbuda
- 17°04′02.9″N 61°45′05.3″W
- Location: Saint Peter, Antigua and Barbuda

History
- Built: 1770

Historical Site of Antigua and Barbuda

Little Duers is an official historic site in Saint Peter, Antigua and Barbuda. It was a sugar plantation established in 1770. The sugar mill tower no longer stands. 73 people were enslaved here at the time of emancipation.
