= The Grange, Saint Philip =

Official historic site of Antigua and Barbuda

The Grange
- Location within Antigua and Barbuda
- 17°03′41.03″N 61°43′27.81″W
- Location: Saint Philip, Antigua and Barbuda

History
- Built: c. 1851

Historical Site of Antigua and Barbuda

The Grange is an official historic site in Saint Philip, Antigua and Barbuda. It was a sugar plantation with its last incarnation established around 1851. The sugar mill tower no longer stands. The first incarnation of this plantation was founded by the Surinamese-exile Duncombe family before merging it into Gaynor's Estate.
