= Donovans, Antigua and Barbuda =

Official historic site of Antigua and Barbuda

Donovans
- Location within Antigua and Barbuda
- 17°06′30.2″N 61°47′09.0″W
- Location: Saint George, Antigua and Barbuda

History
- Built: 1680s

Historical Site of Antigua and Barbuda

Donovans is an official historic site in Saint George, Antigua and Barbuda. It was a sugar plantation established in the 1680s. The sugar mill tower no longer stands and 162 people were enslaved here at the time of emancipation.
