= Jolly Hill =

Official historic site of Antigua and Barbuda

- Location within Antigua and Barbuda
- 17°04′06″N 61°52′21″W
- Location: Saint Mary, Antigua and Barbuda

History
- Built: 1661

Historical Site of Antigua and Barbuda

Jolly Hill is an official historic site in Saint Mary, Antigua and Barbuda. It was a sugar plantation established in 1661 and today it is a neighbourhood of Bolans. The sugar mill tower no longer stands. 240 people were enslaved here at the time of emancipation.
