= Yorks, Saint Mary =

Official historic site of Antigua and Barbuda

Yorks
- Location within Antigua and Barbuda
- 17°04′42.9″N 61°52′55.8″W
- Location: Saint Mary, Antigua and Barbuda

History
- Built: 1670

Historical Site of Antigua and Barbuda

Yorks is an official historic site in Saint Mary, Antigua and Barbuda. It was a sugar plantation established in 1670. The sugar mill tower continues to stand. 146 people were enslaved here at the time of emancipation.
