= Bolans Hill =

Mountain in Antigua and Barbuda

- Location within Antigua and Barbuda

Highest point
- Elevation: 142 m (466 ft)
- Prominence: 98 m (322 ft)
- Coordinates: 17°03′32.37″N 61°52′40.29″W

Geography
- Location: Antigua and Barbuda
- Parent range: Shekerley Mountains

Bolans Hill is a peak located near Bolans village in Saint Mary, Antigua and Barbuda. There is also a neighbourhood in the village named after it. It is at the very edge of the Shekerley Mountains. The hill has an elevation of 142 m (466 ft) and a prominence of 98 m (322 ft).
