= Giles Blizzard's Estate =

Official historic site of Antigua and Barbuda

- Location within Antigua and Barbuda
- 17°08′29.5″N 61°48′48.5″W
- Location: Saint George, Antigua and Barbuda

History
- Built: 1650s

Historical Site of Antigua and Barbuda

Giles Blizzard's Estate is an official historic site in Saint George, Antigua and Barbuda. It was a sugar plantation established in the 1650s. The sugar mill tower continues to stand. 159 people were enslaved here at the time of emancipation.
