= Langfords, Antigua and Barbuda =

Official historic site of Antigua and Barbuda

Langford's
- Location within Antigua and Barbuda
- 17°09′25.9″N 61°49′39.7″W
- Location: Saint John, Antigua and Barbuda

History
- Built: 17th century

Historical Site of Antigua and Barbuda

Langford's is an official historic site in Saint John, Antigua and Barbuda. It was a sugar plantation established in the 17th century. The sugar mill tower continues to stand and 305 people were enslaved here at the time of emancipation.
