= Horsford's Estate =

Official historic site of Antigua and Barbuda

Horsford's
- Location within Antigua and Barbuda
- 17°01′34.4″N 61°47′00.2″W
- Location: Saint Paul, Antigua and Barbuda

History
- Built: 1750s

Historical Site of Antigua and Barbuda

Horsford's is an official historic site in Saint Paul, Antigua and Barbuda. It was a sugar plantation established in the 1750s. The sugar mill tower no longer stands. In 1829 the estate covered 204 acres.
