= Kelvin Simon =

Antiguan politician

Kelvin Craig Simon
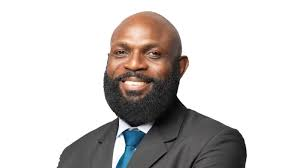

Member of the House of Representatives of Antigua and Barbuda
- In office 24 October 2023 – 1 April 2026
- Preceded by: Vacant
- Succeeded by: Dwayne George
- Constituency: St. Mary's South
- In office 18 January 2023 – 7 June 2023
- Preceded by: Samantha Marshall
- Succeeded by: Vacant
- Constituency: St. Mary's South

Personal details
- Party: United Progressive Party
- Profession: Politician

Kelvin Craig Simon, nicknamed Shugy (/ʃʊɡi/), is an Antiguan politician and member of the United Progressive Party in Antigua and Barbuda. Before entering politics, he worked as a guidance counselor and basketball player.

== Early life and education ==
Simon spent 15 years in the public service of Antigua and Barbuda, where he worked as a guidance counselor at several schools, including St. Mary's Secondary School, Ottos Comprehensive School, and Villa Primary School. Simon holds a degree in counseling and human resource management from the Caribbean Nazarene College in Trinidad, and is a certified personal trainer.

Simon played for the Antigua National Basketball Team.

== Political career ==
Simon was first elected as the Member of Parliament for St. Mary's South in the 2023 general election. Running as a candidate for the United Progressive Party (UPP), he defeated the incumbent Samantha Marshall of the Antigua Labour Party (ALP) by a margin of 199 votes.

In February 2023, a High Court judge ruled in his favor, allowing him to be sworn in as an MP despite ongoing legal disputes over his nomination.

Simon's victory was challenged due to his previous status as a public servant at the time of his nomination, leading to a legal petition against his right to hold the seat. In response to the legal challenges and to ensure the legitimacy of his position, Simon resigned from Parliament in June 2023, triggering a by-election. In the subsequent by-election held in October 2023, Simon was re-elected, making him the first candidate to win two elections in the same year. Simon received 1,065 votes against his opponent's 891.

After a series of resignations experienced by the UPP on 2024, Simon refuted rumors suggesting that he planned to step down from his position and relocate to the United States.

== Community involvement ==
Simon co-founded "Project Bolans", an initiative focused on community development through sports tournaments, clean-ups, and food distribution drives.
