= Lower Cedar Hill =

Official historic site of Antigua and Barbuda

- Location within Antigua and Barbuda
- 17°06′08.7″N 61°46′38.6″W
- Location: Saint Peter, Antigua and Barbuda

History
- Built: 1750s

Historical Site of Antigua and Barbuda

Lower Cedar Hill, also known as Byam South Mill, is an official historic site in Saint Peter, Antigua and Barbuda. It was a sugar plantation established in the 1750s. The sugar mill tower was destroyed by a fire in 2000. 266 people were enslaved here in 1829.
