= Denis Bowers Rehabilitation Center =

Official historic site of Antigua and Barbuda

- Location within Antigua and Barbuda
- 17°4′48.1″N 61°42′35.5″W
- Location: Saint Philip, Antigua and Barbuda

History
- Built: 1743

Historical Site of Antigua and Barbuda
- Official name: Comfort Hall

The Denis Bowers Rehabilitation Center (DBRC), formerly the Boy's Training Centre, is a juvenile detention facility located in Comfort Hall, an official historic site in Saint Philip, Antigua and Barbuda. Comfort Hall was established in 1743 and at the time of emancipation had 172 slaves. The estate's sugar mill tower has since been converted into the centre, the main juvenile detention location in the country. The tower converted from wind to steam technology and was formerly known as Thomas' or Crump's. It likely shared resources with Gray's Belfast, a nearby plantation.
