= Gunthorpes =

Coordinates: 17°6′32″N 61°48′30″W

- Village
- Interactive map of Gunthorpes
- Country: Antigua and Barbuda
- Parish: Saint John

Area
  - Total: 0.33 km^{2} (0.13 sq mi)

Population (2011)
  - Total: 432

Gunthorpes is a village in Saint John, Antigua and Barbuda. It had a population of 432 people in 2011.

== Geography ==
According to the Antigua and Barbuda Statistics Division, the village had a total area of 0.33 square kilometres in 2011.

== Demographics ==
There were 432 people living in Gunthorpes as of the 2011 census. The village was 85.68% African. The population was born in different countries, including 68.03% in Antigua and Barbuda and 7.42% in Guyana. The population had diverse religious affiliations, including 15.93% Anglican, 14.62% Pentecostal, and 9.92% Adventist.
