= Willock's Estate =

Official historic site of Antigua and Barbuda

Willock's
- Location within Antigua and Barbuda
- 17°03′09.4″N 61°52′48.1″W
- Location: Saint Mary, Antigua and Barbuda

History
- Built: 1750s

Historical Site of Antigua and Barbuda

Willock's is an official historic site in Saint Mary, Antigua and Barbuda. It was a sugar plantation established in the 1750s. The sugar mill tower no longer stands. 98 people were enslaved here at the time of emancipation, although at its peak the estate was home to about 500 people.
