= Tranquil Vale =

Official historic site of Antigua and Barbuda

- Location within Antigua and Barbuda
- 17°03′28.5″N 61°52′55.8″W
- Location: Saint Mary, Antigua and Barbuda

History
- Built: 1750s

Historical Site of Antigua and Barbuda

Tranquil Vale, also known as Tottenham Park, is an official historic site in Saint Mary, Antigua and Barbuda. It was a sugar plantation established in the 1750s. The sugar mill tower continues to stand. 57 people were enslaved here at the time of emancipation.
