= Howard's Estate =

Official historic site of Antigua and Barbuda

Howard's
- Location within Antigua and Barbuda
- 17°01′39.6″N 61°48′22.4″W
- Location: Saint Paul, Antigua and Barbuda

History
- Built: 1750s

Historical Site of Antigua and Barbuda

Howard's is an official historic site in Saint Paul, Antigua and Barbuda. It was a sugar plantation established in the 1750s. The sugar mill tower continues to stand. 298 people were enslaved here in 1829.
