= Blubber Valley =

Official historic site of Antigua and Barbuda

- Location within Antigua and Barbuda
- 17°03′37.1″N 61°51′41.4″W
- Location: Saint Mary, Antigua and Barbuda

History
- Built: before 1685

Historical Site of Antigua and Barbuda

Blubber Valley, also known as Mosquito Cove, is an official historic site in Saint Mary, Antigua and Barbuda. It was a sugar plantation established before 1685. The sugar mill tower no longer stands. In 1829, 240 people were enslaved here.

There is a reverse osmosis plant located here.
