= Cades Bay =

- Locality
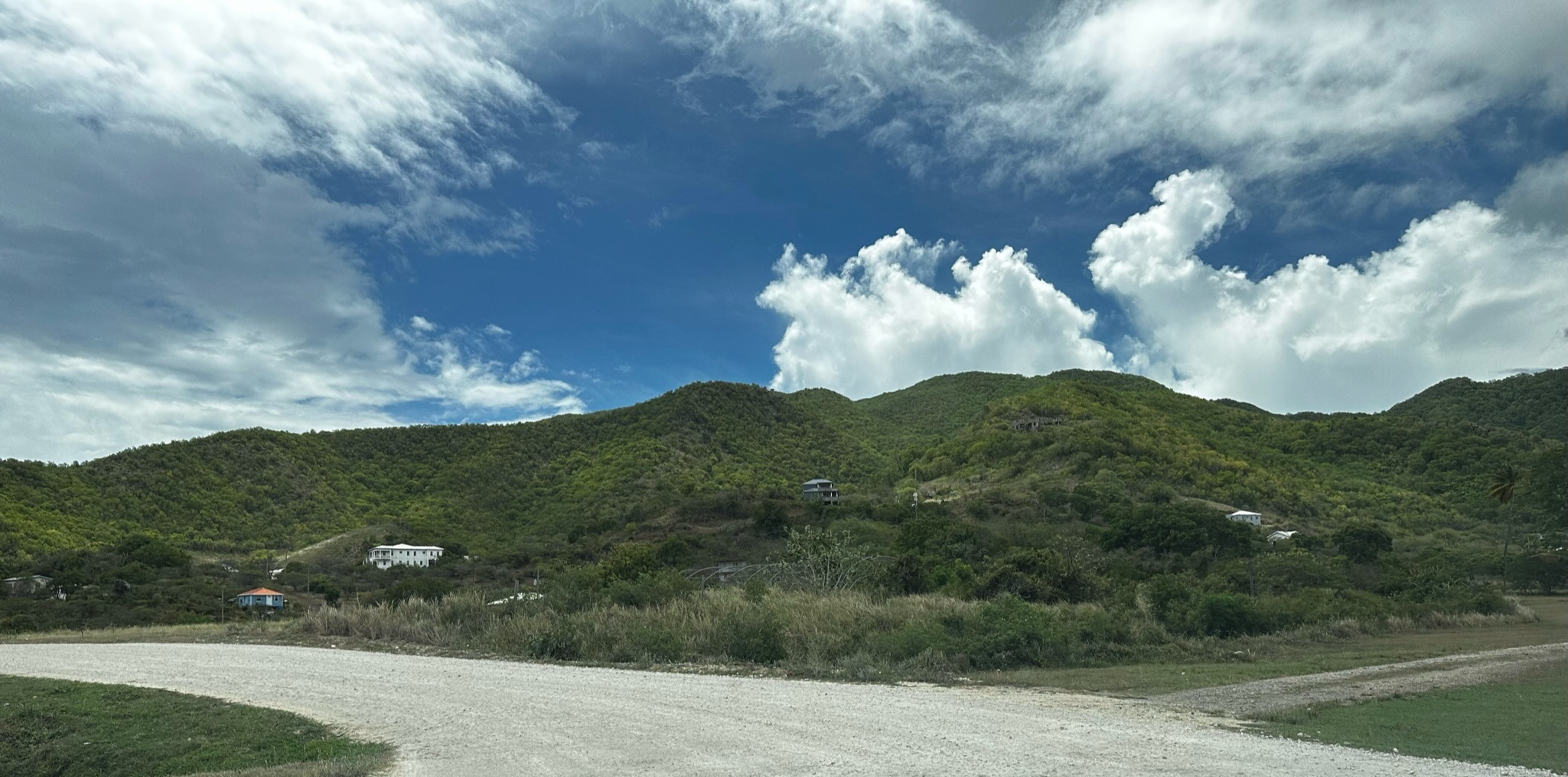
- Cades Bay in 2023

- Location within Antigua
- Coordinates: 17°01′36.95″N 61°51′46.35″W
- Country: Antigua and Barbuda
- Parish: Saint Mary

Cades Bay (/keɪdz/) is a locality in Saint Mary, Antigua and Barbuda between Urlings and Old Road. Off the coast of the locality is Cades Reef (17°00′26.4″N 61°52′39.4″W) that is popular with snorkelers and important to the local economy. Most of the land in Cades Bay is used for crop farming, with some wetlands, mangroves, and forests also present.

Cades Bay is overlooked by Cades Peak. It is located in the volcanic suite of Antigua and the Pineapple Belt, the only place where the Antigua black pineapple can be grown. A notable location in the community is the Cades Bay Agricultural Station (17°01′35.02″N 61°51′45.21″W), which is located on Old Road and produces tens of thousands of Antigua black pineapples a year.

The locality is on the shores of the Cades Bay Marine Reserve which includes the reef and much of ocean in Antigua's southwest. The area is prone to flooding and storm surges. The Piango Fest (derived from "pineapple-mango") is held in the locality every year.
