= Montero's Estate =

Official historic site of Antigua and Barbuda

Montero's
- Location within Antigua and Barbuda
- 17°04′39.9″N 61°51′45.1″W
- Location: Saint Mary, Antigua and Barbuda

History
- Built: 1711

Historical Site of Antigua and Barbuda

Montero's is an official historic site in Saint Mary, Antigua and Barbuda. It was a sugar plantation established in 1711. The sugar mill tower continues to stand. 112 people were enslaved here at the time of emancipation.
