= Saint Mary, Antigua and Barbuda =

Coordinates: 17°02′N 61°53′W

Parish of Saint Mary
- Parish
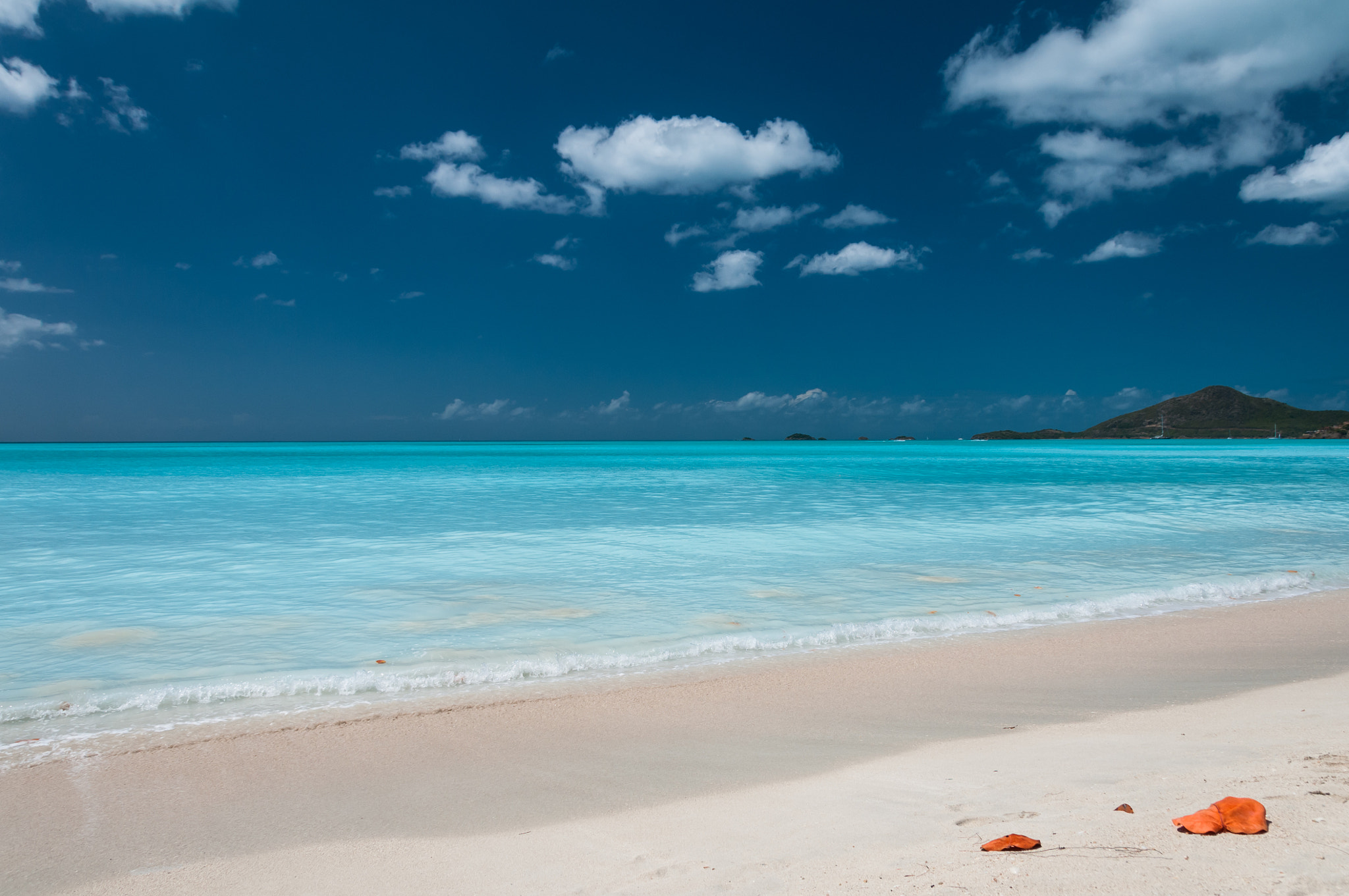
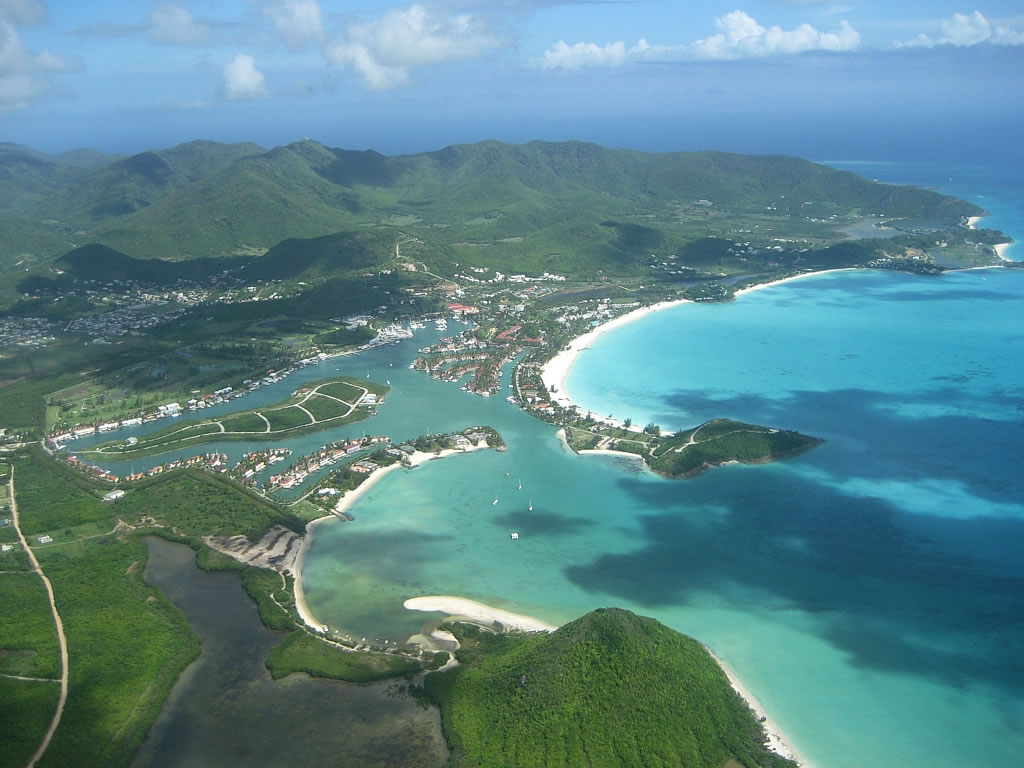
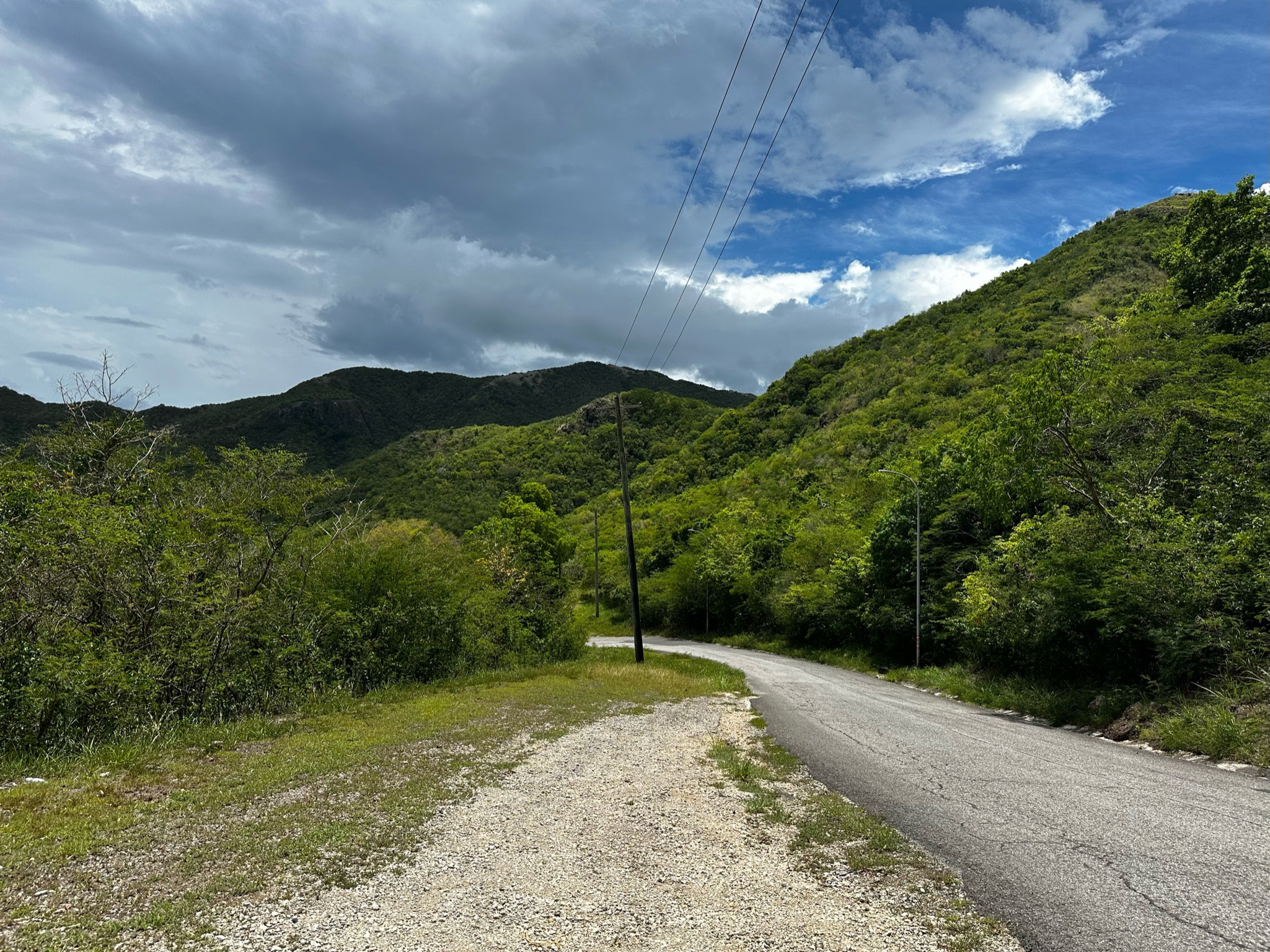
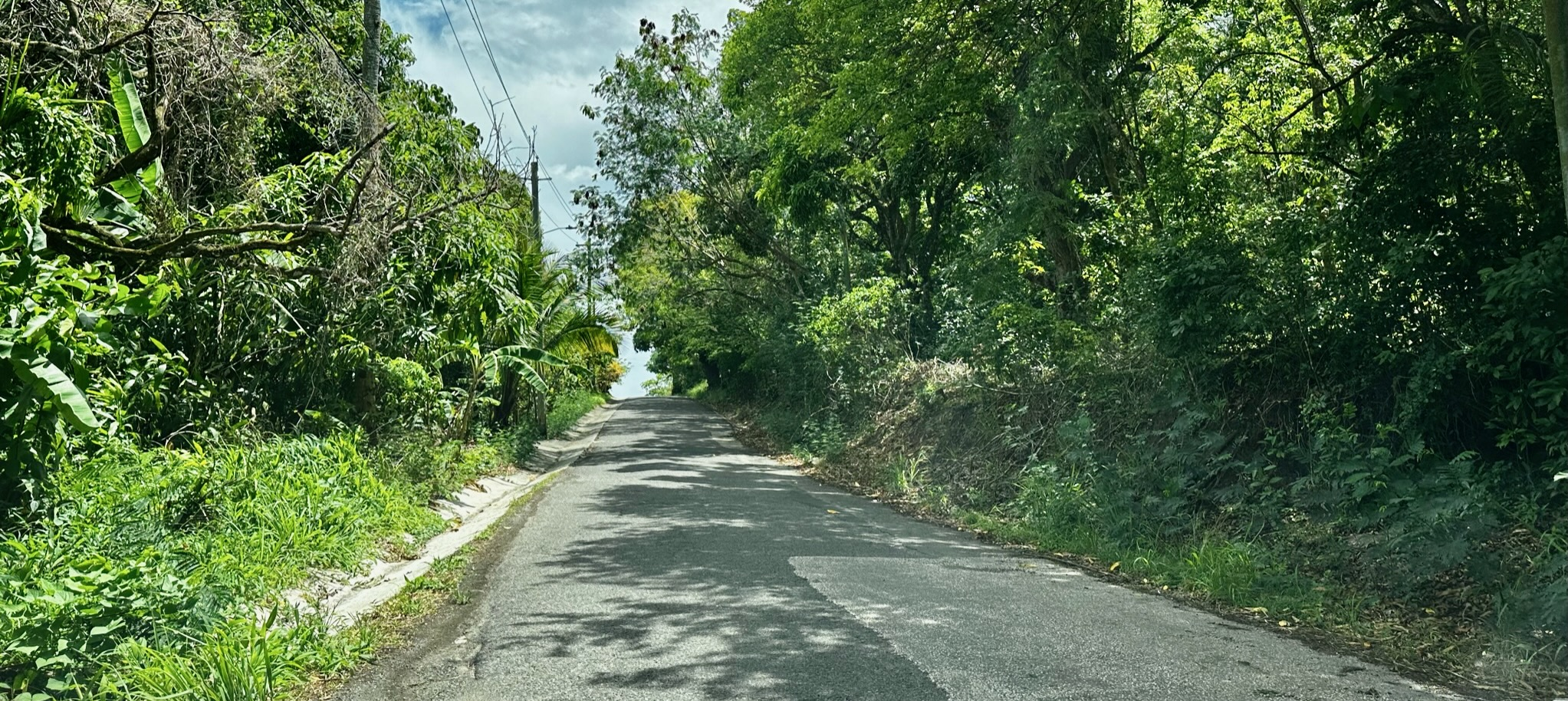
- (from top: left to right) Valley Church Beach, Jolly Harbour, the Shekerley Mountains near John Hughes, Wallings

- Country: Antigua and Barbuda
- Established: 24 August 1681; 345 years ago (old style); 3 September 1681; 345 years ago (new style)
- Capital: Old Road
- Largest city: Bolans

Population
  - 2018 estimate: 8,141
  - Density: 115.16/km^{2} (298.3/sq mi)
- HDI (2023): ▲0.843 very high · 5th
- Time zone: UTC-4 (AST)

Saint Mary (South Antiguan Creole: Sen Mieree), officially the Parish of Saint Mary, is a parish of Antigua and Barbuda on the island of Antigua. Saint Mary borders Saint John to the north, and Saint Paul to the east. Saint Mary is dominated by the Shekerley Mountains, and its northern border is largely defined by the mountains, and by Cooks Creek. The largest city in the parish is Bolans, home to the Jolly Harbour neighbourhood, and the parish church is located in Old Road. Saint Mary was permanently established with the other four original parishes in 1692. It had an estimated population of 8,141 in 2018.

The only area in which the Antigua black pineapple can be produced is the Pineapple Belt, which includes Saint Mary. The settlements of Old Road and Urlings are located in the southern part of the parish, and Bolans and Jennings are located in the flat northern half of the parish, where the majority of Saint Mary's population is concentrated. The Shekerley Mountains shield most of the parish's land area from human population, leaving the rainforest portion of the parish largely uninhabited. The remote community of John Hughes is one of the few settlements found inside the Sherkerley Mountains.

Saint Mary was created in August 1681, when Antigua was divided into five parishes. Saint Mary and the four other parishes were permanently established in July 1692, and confirmed in January 1693. The primary objective of the establishment of parishes was providing for the parish church. The majority of the parish's agricultural lands, with the exception of the mountains, were formerly home to sugar mills. Numerous historical relics from the parish can still be seen today, including the Yorke's and Sawcolt's plantations.

== History ==
=== Jolly Beach people ===
The Amerindian Jolly Beach site is the most well-known example of a fully intact archaic habitation site, dating back to the earliest period of human occupation in Antigua and Barbuda. The site was inhabited between 3,500 and 4,000 years ago, according to two radiocarbon dates from 1,775 and 1,589 BC. The term "archaic age" refers to a time when agricultural practices and pottery production were not even possible due to a lack of technological advancements. The Jolly Beach inhabitants have subsisted on a variety of local vegetation and marine resources. They used wood, flint, shell, and volcanic stone as their tool materials. Similar tools have been discovered in South America, suggesting that the Jolly Beach people originated there. As opposed to the later Tainos and Island Caribs who were spotted by the European missionaries and explorers, it is unknown the name of the tribe who resided there or the language they spoke.

=== Ceramic period ===
One of the locations of the earliest European settlements in Antigua is acknowledged to be Cades Bay. Nestled in the lee of the Sherkerley Mountains, this lush coastal plain is shielded by a substantial barrier reef. The most notable pre-Columbian archaeological deposit is from the early Ceramic Age (Arawak) Saladoid period, despite signs of Archaic Age occupation. The land is currently utilized for pineapple farming, which has caused significant disturbance. Nevertheless, during the ploughing sessions, important discoveries were made.

=== British period ===
On 24 August 1681, Saint Mary's parish was founded. The parish was divided into three divisions in 1749: Old Road Division, Bermudian Valley Division, and New Division. The Johnsons Point, Crabs Hill, Urlings, and Old Road areas, which are in the southern part of the parish, make up the Old Road Division. Jolly Harbour and a portion of Bolans make up the majority of the Bermudian Valley Division. Most of the flat northern areas of the parish are in New Division. There were more than twenty-nine sugar plantations in Saint Mary, staffed by slave labour until its abolition in 1833.

== Geography ==
Boggy Peak, formerly known as Mount Obama, is the highest point in both the parish and Antigua and Barbuda. Although the parish is dominated by the Shekerley Mountains, most of its people live either along the shore or in the district's northern, flatter area (the Montero Plain), which is home to Bolands, the parish capital. Because of the area's unique rainfall patterns and long history in agriculture, Saint Mary and Saint Paul are the primary locations for the cultivation of the Antigua Black Pineapple, which is thought to be the sweetest pineapple in the world. The parish's northern, flatter portion contains the majority of its streams. The parish is home to some of the biggest wetlands and bodies of water, including Yorks Salt Pond, Wallings Reservoir, The Flashes, and Jolly Hill Salt Pond. Similar to Saint Paul, the parish includes few islands.

== Demographics ==
Of the population in 2011, 76.51% were born in Antigua and Barbuda. A total of 0.29% of the population was born in Africa, 0.10% in "other Latin or North American countries," 0.39% in "other Caribbean countries," 0.69% in Canada, 0.26% in "other Asian countries," 0.95% in "other European countries," 2.97% in Dominica, 0.63% in the Dominican Republic, 4.61% in Guyana, 4.41% in Jamaica, 0.48% in Montserrat, 0.37% in St. Kitts and Nevis, 0.30% in St. Lucia, 0.29% in St. Vincent and the Grenadines, 0.40% in Trinidad and Tobago, 1.63% in the United Kingdom, and 3.14% in the United States. The remainder were from the United States Virgin Islands and not-stated.

Black people made up 92.13% of the population, followed by White people (3.49%), East Indian people (0.37%), mixed-race white/black people (0.48%), other mixed people (1.61%), Hispanic people (0.75%), Syrian and Lebanese people (0.04%), people of other ethnicities (0.49%), and the remainder were people who did not specify.

Most of the population was Anglican (21.94%), Adventist (17.20%), Moravian (15.21%), Pentecostal (7.81%), and irreligious (6.54%). 1.37% of the population was Rastafarian.

South Antiguan Creole is native to the parish and the village of Swetes in Saint Paul.

== Economy ==
In 2011, there were 358 business owners in the parish. 25.37% made under EC$1,000 per month from their business, 17.40% made $1,000 to $1,999, 20.35% made $2,000 to $2,999, 17.70% made $3,000 to $4,999, and 19.17% made over $5,000. Out of the 3,391 workers in the parish, 21.36% were paid government employees, 3.27% were paid statutory body employees, 55.34% were paid private employees, 2.12% were paid private home employees, 3.39% were self-employed without paid employees, 12.36% were self-employed without paid employees, 1.15% had another worker status, and 1.00% didn't know or didn't state. Out of the 3,114 people asked, 2.75% were paid a daily salary, 45.07% were paid a weekly salary, 19.80% were paid a fortnightly salary, 30.04% were paid a monthly salary, and the remainder were paid another salary.
