= Saint John, Antigua and Barbuda =

Coordinates: 17°7′N 61°50′W

Parish of Saint John
- Parish
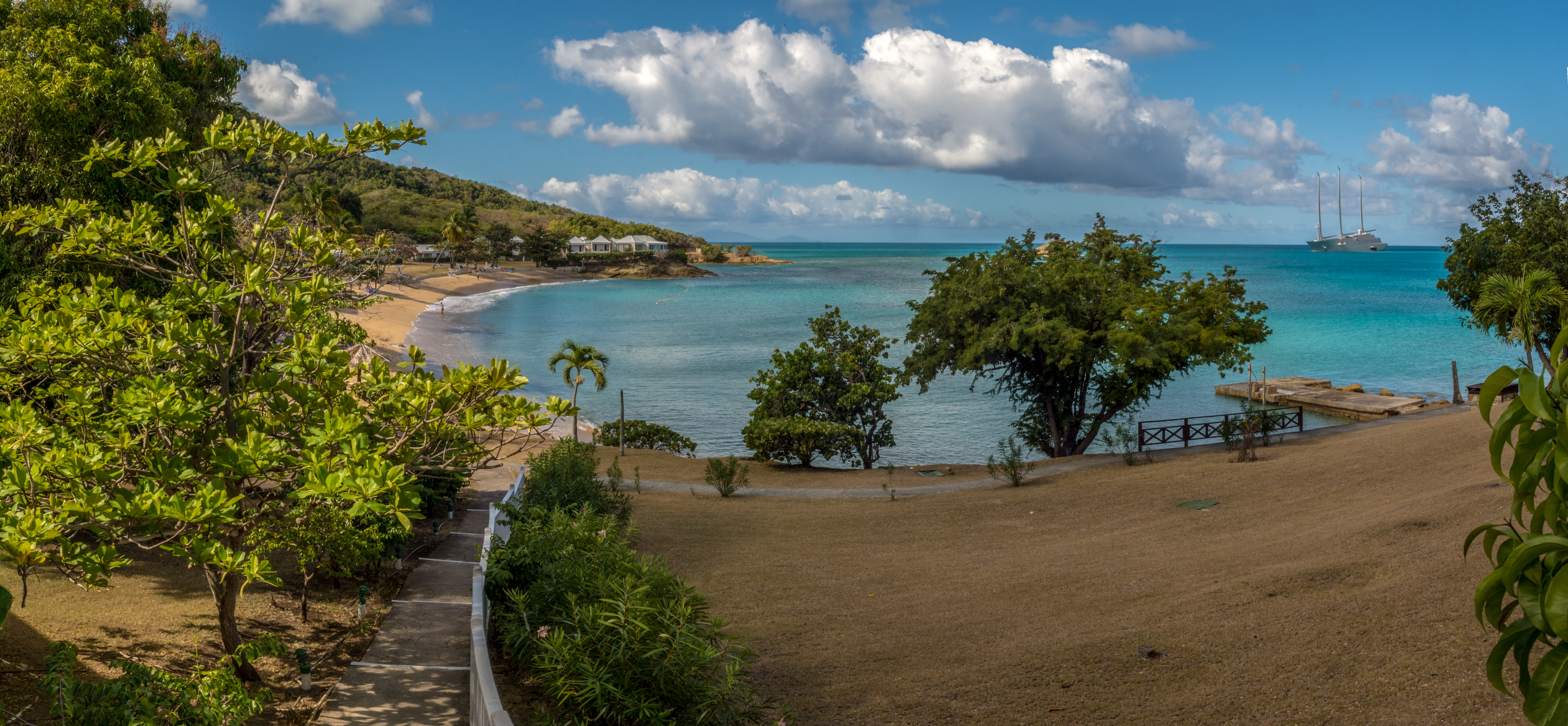
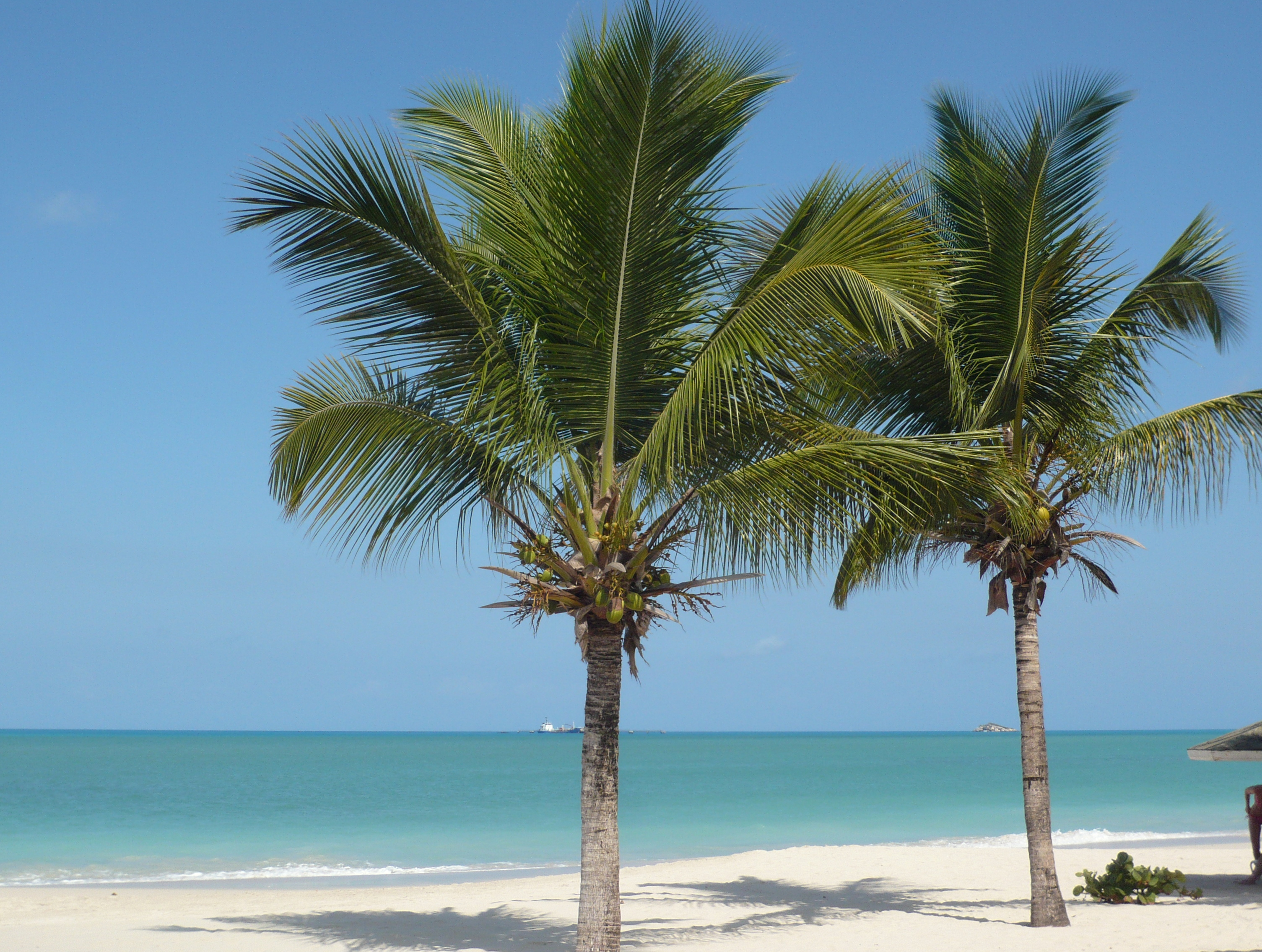
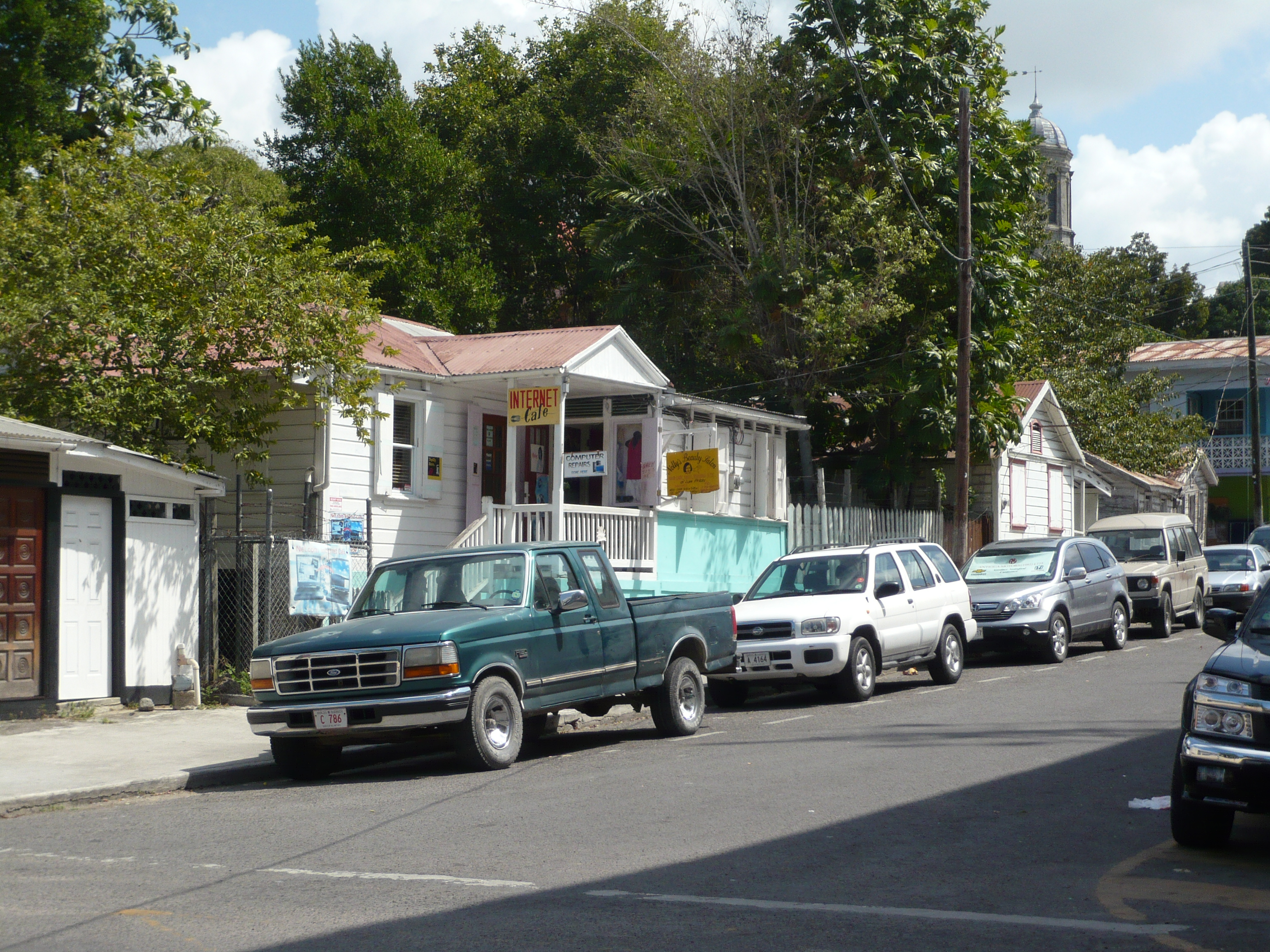
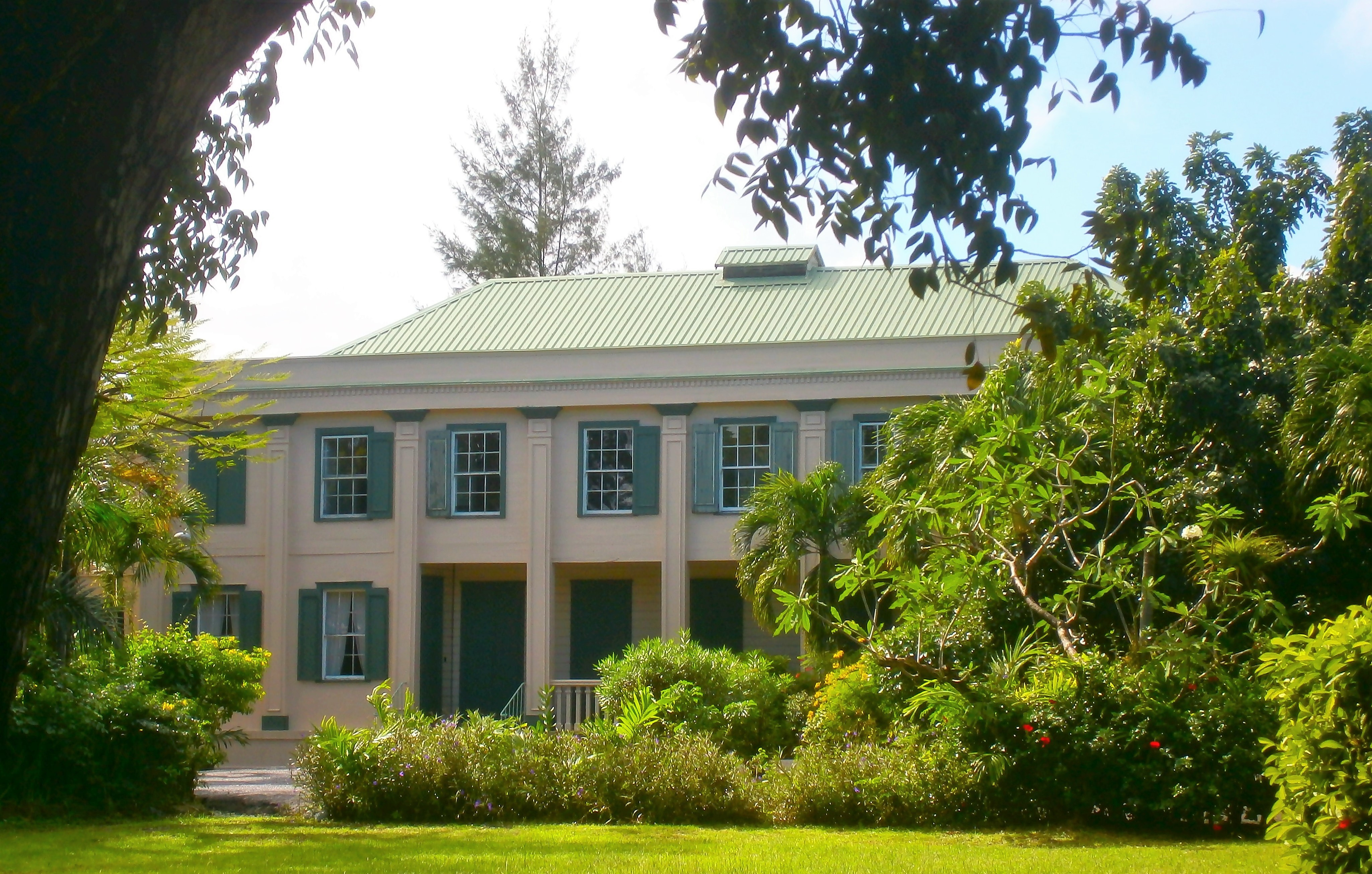
- (from top: left to right) Sea Grapes Beach, Dickenson Bay Beach, a street in St. John's, the Government House

- Country: Antigua and Barbuda
- Island: Antigua
- Established: 24 August 1681; 345 years ago (old style); 3 September 1681; 345 years ago (new style)
- Capital: St. John's
- Demonym(s): Saint Johnstonian

Government
  - MPs: Gaston Browne; Melford Nicholas; Steadroy Benjamin; Maria Bird-Browne; Michael Joseph; Charles Fernandez; Daryll Matthew; Anthony Smith; Jamale Pringle; Philmore Benjamin; Michael Freeland; Rawdon Turner

Area
  - Total: 28.5 sq mi (74 km^{2})

Population
  - 2018 estimate: 56,736
  - Density: 772.66/km^{2} (2,001.2/sq mi)
- HDI (2023): ▲0.848 very high · 3rd
- Time zone: UTC-4 (AST)

Saint John (Antiguan and Barbudan Creole: Sen Jaan), officially the Parish of Saint John, is a civil parish of Antigua and Barbuda, on the northwestern portion of Antigua island. Its capital is the city of St. John's. Saint John borders Saint Mary, Saint Peter, Saint George, and Saint Paul. Saint John faces the Caribbean Sea. Saint John is surrounded by some of Antigua's most premier beaches. Saint John had a population of 56,736 in a 2018 estimate, making it home to the majority of the population in Antigua and Barbuda.

While Saint John is a civil administrative division, the Anglican parish church is located in the city of St. John's. Saint John is mostly centered around the St. John's urban area and the northern tourist area, but is also home to more rural areas in the southern salient and in the Five Islands-Yeptons area. Due to Saint John holding the majority of the population of Antigua and Barbuda, it is home to hundreds of populated locations some of which are vastly different from another. The island of Redonda is also under the administration of Saint John.

Saint John was created on 24 August 1681, when Antigua was divided into five parishes. Saint John and the four other parishes were permanently established in July 1692, and confirmed in January 1693. The primary objective of the establishment of parishes was providing for the parish church. Outside of the city, most of the rural areas of the parish were originally used as sugar mills. Many remnants of the parish's past are still visible in the modern day, such as with the Cedar Valley Plantation, or the Weatherill's plantation.

== Governance ==
Saint John coincides with the boundaries of Magistrates' Court District "A". While local government is nearly nonexistent in Antigua, there is a limited form of local government in the city centre of St. John's, known as the Saint John's Development Corporation. As the country's primary political and cultural hub, Saint John is granted significantly more autonomy than the other parishes, with various governmental offices belonging exclusively to the parish. Historically, when village councils were active, there were proposals to create village councils in Potters, Cedar Grove, Five Islands, and St. Johnston and Clare Hall. A village council in All Saints, which extends across three parishes, was also constituted.

== Education ==
Island Academy International, the sole international school in the country, is located in the village of Buckleys within Saint John. It was formerly Oliver's Estate Island Academy.
