= Historical site of Antigua and Barbuda =

A historical site of Antigua and Barbuda is a site deemed by the Museum of Antigua and Barbuda to have significant cultural and historic value to the country. There are 334 officially recognized historical sites in Antigua and Barbuda, including nine industrial sites, 109 mill towers, and forty military sites. Sites eligible to receive this designation include places of African heritage, exceptional natural landscapes, mystical sites, environmental sites, plantations, military forts, individual trees, and any other site deemed of high importance to the country. This designation succeeds attempts in the 1960s and 1970s to map historic sites on the island– this designation is staffed by volunteer researchers with the goal of identifying sites in the country that could be eligible for World Heritage status. Work is being done to reassess historical sites to protect them from climate change.
