= List of mountains and hills of Antigua and Barbuda =

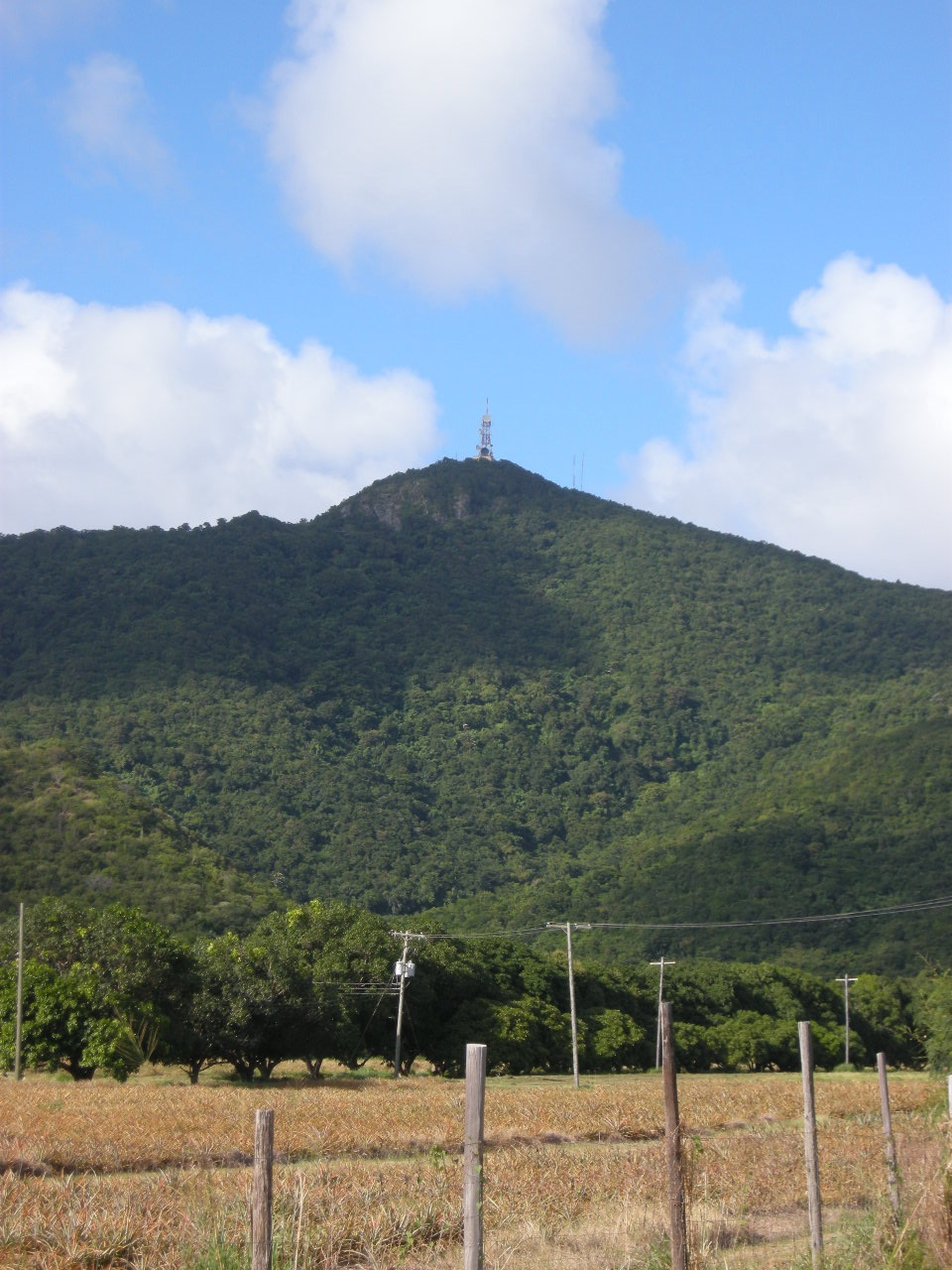
Boggy Peak

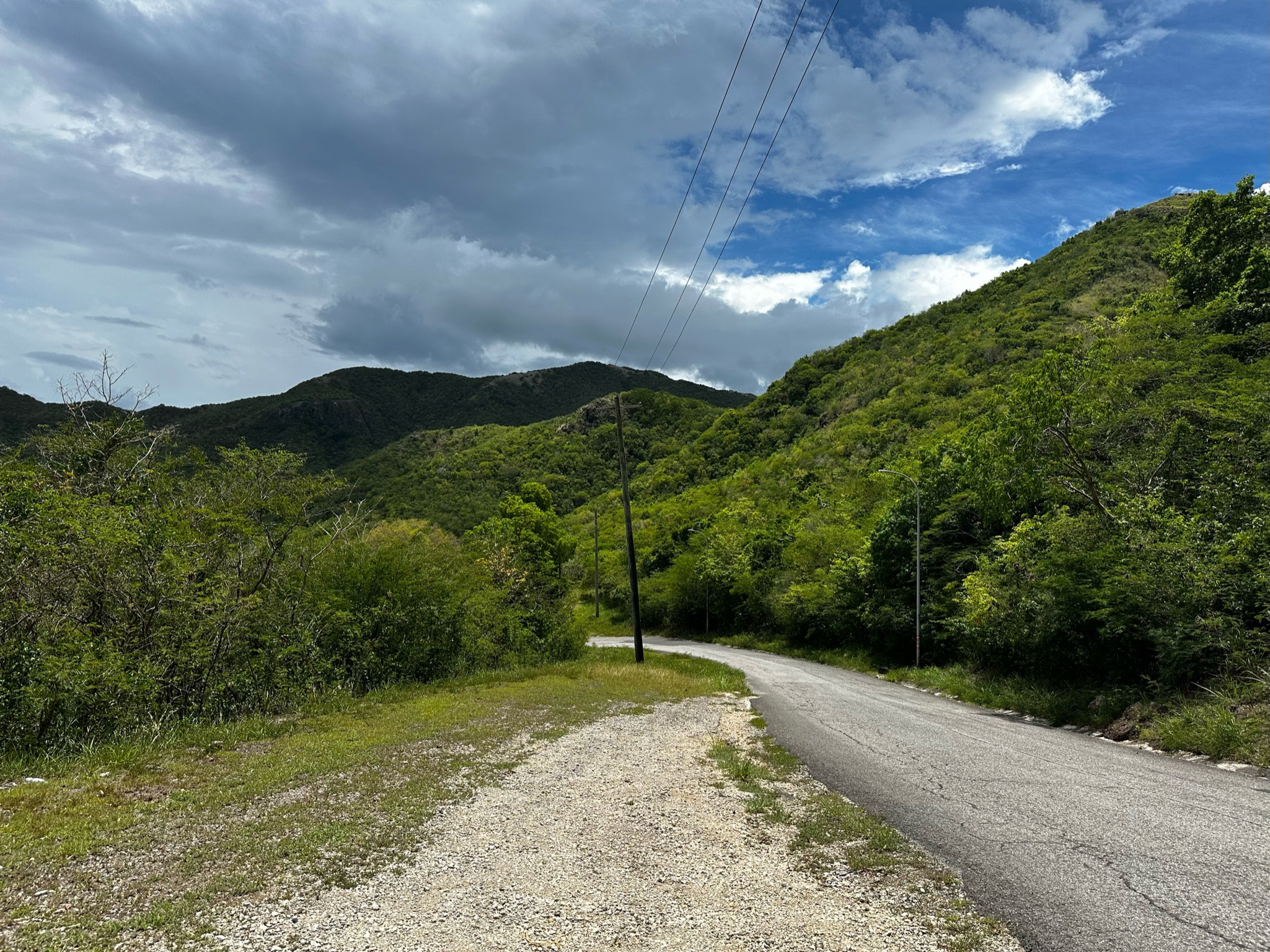
Shekerley Mountains near John Hughes village

This list includes significant mountains and hills located in Antigua and Barbuda. Most of the highest mountains and hills of Antigua are located in the Shekerley Mountains, while all of the highest points of Barbuda are located in the Barbuda Highlands. Out of the sixty-five named peaks in the country, the tallest is Boggy Peak, at a height of 402 metres. Excluding various points on Redonda, the most prominent point outside of the Shekerley Mountains is Mount Thomas in Saint John.

== Table ==
| Mountain or hill | Height (m) | Parish or dependency |
|---|---|---|
| Boggy Peak | 402 | Saint Mary |
| Signal Hill | 370 | Saint Mary |
| Sage Hill | 349 | Saint Mary |
| McNish Mountain | 339 | Saint Mary, Saint John |
| Sugar Loaf Mountain | 309 | Saint Paul |
| Rock Peak | 287 | Saint Mary |
| Monks Hill | 211 | Saint Paul |
| Mount Thomas | 158 | Saint John |
| Monteros Hill | 154 | Saint Mary |
| Bolans Hill | 142 | Saint Mary |
| Santa Maria Hill | 101 | Saint John |
| Parrys Hill | 93 | Saint Peter |
| Dow Hill | 79 | Saint Paul |
| Mosquito Hill | 52 | Saint Mary |

== See also ==
- Geography of Antigua and Barbuda
- Lists of mountains by region
- List of mountain peaks of the Caribbean
