= Bendals =

- Village
- The village in August 2026
- Interactive map of the Bendals main place
- Location within Antigua and Barbuda
- Coordinates: 17°4′45.70″N 61°49′46.56″W
- Country: Antigua and Barbuda
- Island: Antigua
- Parish: Saint John

Area
  - Total: 3.77 km^{2} (1.46 sq mi)

Population (2011)
  - Total: 671
  - Density: 178/km^{2} (461/sq mi)
- Time zone: UTC-4

Bendals is a village in Saint John, Antigua and Barbuda. It is located in the Bendals Valley near the former village of St. Luke. It is a dispersed settlement composed of two non-contiguous settlement areas. The core part of the village had a population of 671 in 2011 over an area of 3.77 square kilometres. Its environs, Green Castle, Emanuel, and Bathlodge, are considered separate villages for statistical purposes. However, many residents consider the three villages to be neighbourhoods of Bendals. This larger area has a population of about one-thousand. The village is located on Bendals Road east of Jennings and west of Buckleys. It is connected to Sawcolts by a small road.

The village formed following the emancipation of slaves in the 1830s. A Moravian settlement was located on the former Bendals Estate established in 1823. This estate eventually industrialised, becoming one of two major factories on the island. Following the closure of the factory in the 1940s and the collapse of the sugar industry in favour of tourism, many Bendals residents now commute into St. John's. The village continues to be the site of two quarrying operations.

== Geography ==
According to the National Bureau of Statistics, the village has a land area of 3.77 square kilometres in two enumeration districts. The northern portion of the village is mostly covered by rural settlement and agricultural rough grazing land. About twenty acres are used for quarrying. The central part of the village is mostly used for crop farming. The southern part of the village is mixed between rural settlement and citronella grass fields. The extreme south is part of the tropical forests of the Shekerley Mountains. Bendals is known for its rich soil.

The village is located on the boundary between the volcanic and Central Plain regions of Antigua. It is at high risk for landslides and low risk for drought. The southern part of the village has an elevation of 26 metres.

The southern part of the village is located about 2.2 kilometres west of Buckleys, 4.1 kilometres southwest of Potters, 5.5 kilometres south of Downtown St. John's, 3.5 kilometres east of Jennings, and 2.8 kilometres northwest of Sawcolts. Bendals borders Bathlodge to the north, St. Claire and Buckleys to the east, John Hughes and the Boggy Peak enumeration district to the south, and Emanuel and Green Castle to the west. The main road in the area is Bendals Road. Bendals is about 9.2 kilometres away from the nearest international air service at V. C. Bird International Airport.

== History ==
=== Formation ===
Bendals was named after a plantation owner. Bendals Estate was founded in 1728 and contained a sugar factory connected to the island's former rail network. Today, the only remnant of the estate is the manager's house. At the time of emancipation in 1833, there were 225 people enslaved here. Other former localities in the vicinity of Bendals included Hamiltons (Hamberly), whose residents moved to Bendals following a series of hurricanes in the 1950s, and St. Luke's, home to an extant Anglican church which was often visited by Bendals residents.

The village itself emerged following emancipation. While there was a Moravian settlement on the sugar estate since 1823, it did not develop into a proper village until freed slaves began to move off the plantation.

=== Post-emancipation history ===
A cane field in Bendals, c. 1920

In the 1856 census, Bendals was listed as having a population of forty-four people in nine homes.

In May 1872, it was mentioned in an Antigua Times report that the government had abandoned its initiative to obtain water from a supposed spring in the village. The government was advised to instead build a reservoir in the area. There were also plans to try to connect the village's water supply to Sawcolts's reservoir by pipe. Bendals was largely spared from the impacts of the droughts of the 1870s, sometimes being the rainiest village on the island. However, Bendals continued to rely on other settlements for drinking water. A concrete company also had property in Bendals at this time.

In 1880, a third-class road connected the village to Belvedere and Swetes. In February 1882, a man was arrested on the estate for smoking a pipe in a cane field, a fire hazard. In January 1883, a Chinese criminal claimed that he had hid his knives in the village. At this time, there was a small community known as the "Chinese Barracks" in the village near Green Castle. In December 1884, the road between St. John's and English Harbour was criticised by a St. John's city councillor for its condition starting at the Methodist cemetery in Bendals. In June 1885, it was mentioned that a vacuum pan, a type of sugar cane boiler, was under construction in at the estate. Its construction faced accidents and delays. A popular nursery rhyme parody mentioned Bendals and Green Castle during a disease outbreak among cattle in Belvedere.

In July 1885, the bridge crossing Bendals Ghaut was described as "so reduced as to endanger the safety of the bridge and roadway approaching same, at the first heavy fall of rain". The flow of water under the bridge was also obstructed. It was proposed by the manager of Belvedere Estate that as a solution, the ghaut could be dammed. He also claimed rights over it as private property. By the end of August, the legislative council ordered that the bridge be immediately cleared and that those that made the obstruction be prosecuted. On 27 January 1887, the legislative council declared the road between Bendals and Hamiltons to be a fourth-class road. In April 1889, it was mentioned that roadworks took place between Bendals and Hermitage. In November 1889, a man died at Holberton Hospital after an accident on the estate. In 1890, cane seeds were taken from Bendals and Belvedere to the Kew Gardens in England.

In September 1890, the watercourse sourced from the Body Ponds flowing through Bendals was officially named the "Body Ponds and Bendals Watercourse". An October 1890 report stated that a bridge should be built in Bendals over the ghaut flowing from Hamiltons. In 1891, a report estimated that it would cost about 2,500 pounds to improve the Bendals stream and its tributaries flowing into Five Island Harbour. In June 1891, the "Body Ponds and Bendals Watercourse" was officially renamed to the "Bendals Stream". On 19 September 1891, a report was released condemning the poor work on clearing the stream and stating that two miles of road between Bendals and Bathlodge had been swept away by the stream. In January 1895, there were three storage basins on the Bendals Stream.

An 1895 obituary mentioned that the Bennett family was held in high esteem in the community and that one of it members had become the manager of the estate. In 1896, it was noted that the village had educational facilities. In 1898, a teenage girl named Eleanor Benjamin was drowned in the Bendals stream by a boy. On 5 June 1900, Bendals was placed into the fifth medical district along with the parish of Saint Mary and villages in Round South. On 9 August 1902, a report stated that the Bathlodge Ghaut often flooded the village's road and blocked access. The wall on the east side of the road was described as useless and business in the village was subject to the ghaut's condition. The road was also filled with potholes and hard for horses to use.

=== Industrialisation ===
José Anjo's postcard entitled A cool spot, Bendall's, c. 1908

In 1903, efforts took place to develop the sugar factory in the village as a "well equipped small factory". A committee was proposed to oversee the development of the factory, although it faced delays. As the factory was constructed, the village became very busy, its roads being filled with traffic. The factory's construction was subsidised by the government. The factory opened on 7 May 1904 in a ceremony attended by the governor. In November 1906, artist José Anjo visited the village and was praised by the West India Committee Circular for his "very beautiful view of Bendall's stream, one of the pretty localities in Antigua".

Proximity to the factory was a selling point at the sale of St. Claire's estate in 1908. It was also claimed that Bendals was a favorable location for the planting of sea island cotton. While the rest of the island's agriculture struggled in the early 1910s, Bendals and Fitches Creek were praised for their improved farming methods. The factory also played an important role in mitigating the effects of the period's poor weather, with sugar production in 1911 only five tons lower than in 1910. The factory also gave local peasants renewed confidence in the sugar industry. The factory even attracted workers from other islands such as Saint Croix.

In 1914, the Bendals Government School closed. The factory closed in 1940 and afterwards, cane from the area was transported by train to the central factory in Gunthropes.

A farm in the village

Foothills of the Shekerley Mountains

=== Modern history ===
In 1950, the population of Hamiltons was moved to Bendals due to severe damage from two hurricanes. Around 1969 the new village school was moved from St. Luke's to its present-day location.

In 1970, Bendals-Belvedere-Lower All Saints had a population of 630. The village was apportioned into the St. Mary's North constituency for the 1971 general election. The first member of parliament elected from the constituency was Progressive Labour Movement politician Robert Hall, who had also bought one of the storerooms from the old estate.

In 1974, the St. Thomas neighbourhood was relocated due to quarry blasts. In 1980, there were protests in the village due to a student named Eldra Bachelor being injured in one of these blasts. In 1989, the village was flooded by Hurricane Hugo. Many homes were damaged in 1995 due to Hurricane Luis. The school in the village also had to close due to ash from the Soufrière Hills eruption. In 2009 the village was the site of a bush fire.

The village's core had a population of 473 in 1991 and 479 in 2001. In 2011 it had a population of 671.

Today, many people from the village commute into St. John's.

== Demographics ==
According to the 2011 census, the core area of Bendals had a population of 671. There were four ethnic classifications recorded in the village: Africans (97.86%), unknown (1.15%), other mixed (0.49%), and Hispanic (0.49%). 85.36% of the population was born in Antigua and Barbuda, with other major countries of birth including Dominica (3.45%), Guyana (3.29%), and Jamaica (3.29%). Of the population born in Antigua and Barbuda, 6.55% had lived abroad at some point in their life. Major religious groups in the village included Anglicans (19.77%), irreligious people (12.03%), and the Church of God (11.20%).

The 2011 census counted 192 households. Based on the main material of outer walls, most homes were constructed with either wood (51.56%), a combination of wood and concrete (22.92%), or concrete blocks (13.54%). 94.27% of homes had sheet metal roofs.

A 2007 report stated that there was some poverty in the village and that employment opportunities and educational services were needed by the population. Many participated in box hand schemes. 1.2% of children in the village in 2005 suffered with malnutrition. The drug trade had also recently reached the village. Some poorer people had nutritional deficiencies due to the transition from home-grown food to fast food. In infrastructure, heavy trucks accessing the quarry contributed to the rapid deterioration of the village's roads and some homes were overcrowded. Many residents also suffer from constant dust, smoke, and rubbish coming from the quarry.

== Features ==
Bendals Primary School

The village can be accessed by Bendals Road. There are also two other access roads which are rarely used. Bendals has multiple churches, supermarkets, a bakery, an agricultural station, a clinic, and a diverse group of skilled workers. There is also an active community association. The village has one school, the Bendals Primary School, a complex composed of five buildings.

Bendals has two quarries in its vicinity, Bendals Quarry and Green Castle Quarry. Restaurants include the Time Rite Bakery and Kush Heights Snakette. TJ's Supermarket is located near the main road.

Green Castle Agricultural Station is located near St. Luke's Anglican Church, the historic church in the area. A Seventh-day Adventist Church, the Church of Christ, and the Zion Church of God Bendals also serve the community.

The Bendals Community Group is the main civic association active in the village.

The Bendals Highway Inn serves tourists.
