= Rock Peak (Antigua) =

Mountain in Antigua and Barbuda

- Location within Antigua and Barbuda

Highest point
- Elevation: 287 m (942 ft)
- Prominence: 149 m (489 ft)
- Coordinates: 17°3′40.88″N 61°51′12.27″W

Geography
- Location: Antigua and Barbuda
- Parent range: Shekerley Mountains

Rock Peak is one of the Shekerley Mountains of Saint Mary, Antigua and Barbuda. Standing at 287 metres above sea level, it is one of the tallest peaks in the range and in the parish. The mountain is located in a small patch of tropical rainforest overlooking the Christian Valley to the south and the villages of Emanuel and Bendals to the north. Rock Peak is part of the Antiguan volcanic suite. It is also the source of four ghauts: one that flows through the Christian Valley into Jolly Harbour, two that flow into small ponds, and one that flows into Cooks Creek.
