= Mount Thomas (Antigua) =

- Location within Antigua and Barbuda

Highest point
- Elevation: 158 m (518 ft)
- Prominence: 153 m (502 ft)
- Coordinates: 17°06′26.28″N 61°53′00.78″W

Geography
- Location: Antigua and Barbuda

Mount Thomas is a mountain on the Five Islands peninsula of western Antigua in the parish of Saint John. It is located near Five Islands village, and overlooks Five Island Harbour and The Flashes. It has an elevation of 158 m (518 ft) and a prominence of 153 m (502 ft). It is the most prominent point on the island outside of the Shekerley Mountains.
