= Signal Hill (Antigua and Barbuda) =

Second-highest point on Antigua island, in Antigua and Barbuda

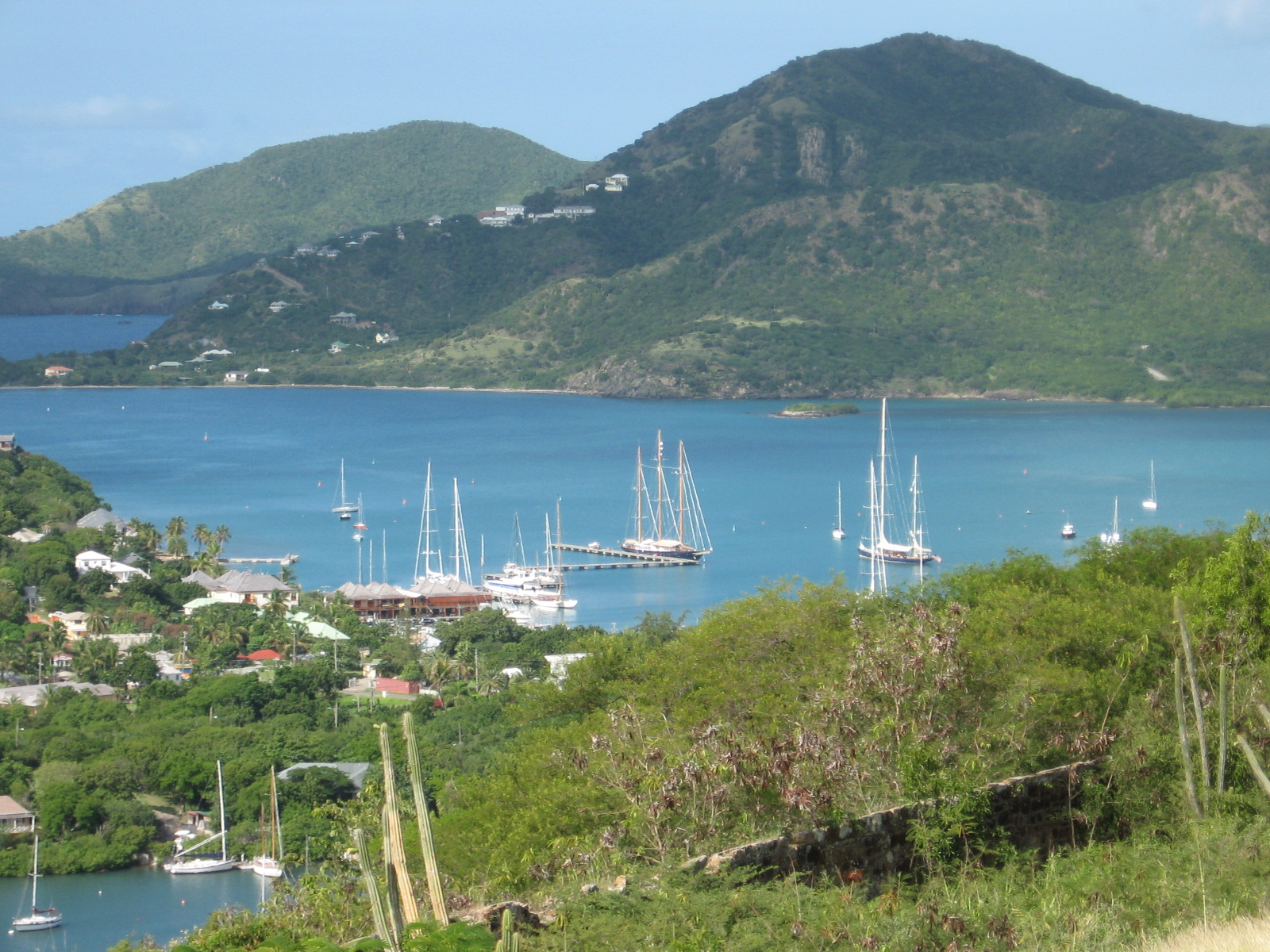
- The Shekerley Mountains with Signal Hill, and Falmouth Harbour.

Highest point
- Elevation: 365 m (1,198 ft)
- Prominence: 233 m (764 ft)
- Coordinates: 17°02′N 61°49′W

Geography
- Location within Antigua and Barbuda
- Location: Antigua and Barbuda
- Parent range: Shekerley Mountains

Signal Hill is a mountain and the second-highest point on Antigua island, in Antigua and Barbuda.

== Geography ==
It is in the Shekerley Mountains range, with an elevation of 365 metres (1,198 ft).

The mountain overlooks the south coast of Antigua to the west of Falmouth Harbour.

The highest point on Antigua is Boggy Peak, also in the Shekerley Mountains.

=== Wallings Forest ===
On the northwest slope of the mountain is Wallings Forest, designated as an important bird area for Antigua and Barbuda. Wallings Forest is home to the Wallings Nature Reserve, established in 2018 as the first Community-Managed National Park in Antigua and Barbuda.

== See also ==
- Landforms of Antigua and Barbuda
- Mountains of the Caribbean
