= Garden Hill (Antigua) =

Mountain in Antigua and Barbuda

- Location within Antigua and Barbuda

Highest point
- Elevation: 135 m (443 ft)
- Prominence: 30 m (98 ft)
- Coordinates: 17°03′05.17″N 61°52′52.88″W

Geography
- Location: Antigua and Barbuda
- Parent range: Shekerley Mountains

Garden Hill is one of the Shekerley Mountains of Saint Mary, Antigua and Barbuda. It has an elevation of 135 m (443 ft) and 30 m (98 ft) of prominence. It overlooks the Orange Valley.
