= Bendals Valley =

Valley of Antigua and Barbuda

- Location within Antigua

Geography
- Country: Antigua and Barbuda
- State: Saint John
- Region: Central Plain
- Coordinates: 17°04′29.31″N 61°50′18.74″W
- River: Cooks Creek

Location
- Interactive map of Bendals Valley

The Bendals Valley is a geographic region in Antigua north of the Shekerley Mountains. Named after the village of Bendals, it is home to some of the highest yielding aquifers on the island. Following Hurricanes Dog and Cat in the 1950s, many people from Hamiltons moved to the valley due to better geography. The government proposed to build a dam in the region in 2025 due to issues with the aging Potworks Dam.
