= Pearns Point =

Westernmost point of Antigua

Coordinates: 17°04′51.39″N 61°54′22.47″W

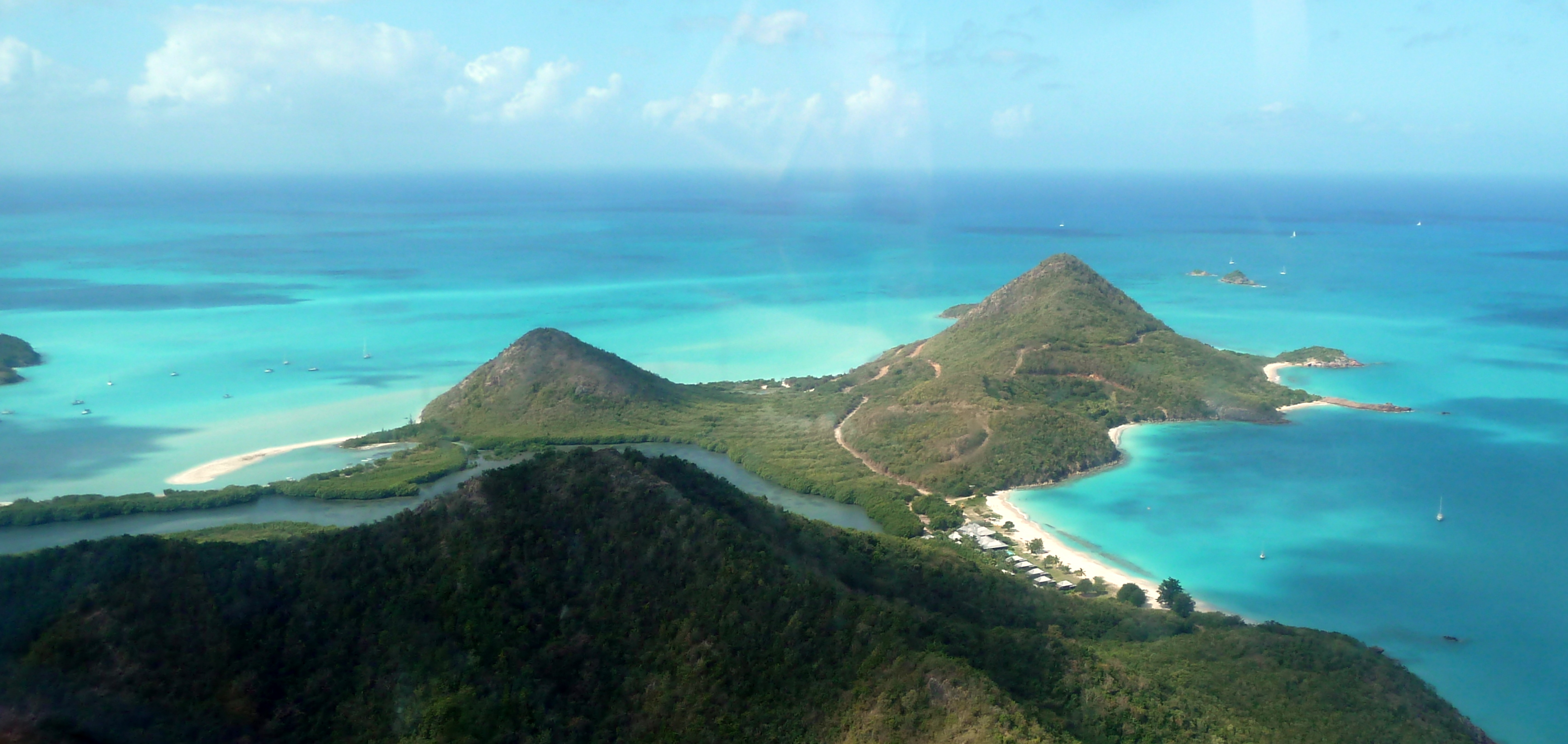
The peninsula in March 2012

Pearns Point is the westernmost point on the island of Antigua. It is a peninsula located to the north of Mosquito Cove, to the south of Five Island Harbour and Hermitage Bay, to the east of the five islands archipelago, and to the west of Jennings to which it is linked by Hermitage Bay Road. Pearns Hill is located on the peninsula at an elevation of 98 m (322 ft). Mosquito Hill is also found here. For the 2011 census, it was enumerated as part of Jolly Harbour.

Environmental issues on the peninsula are primarily the result of climate change and tourism development. Sea level rise at the peninsula is about three to four millimetres annually, and vegetation is often harmed by saline floods. Animal life on the peninsula is limited to seabirds and mongoose. The peninsula is mostly covered by undeveloped forest, with Conocarpus erectus being a native mangrove tree present on the peninsula's coasts. In 2011 the peninsula was quaratined due to the presence of the giant African land snail– this forbade the transport of all contaminated goods from Pearns.

The peninsula is the site of several tourist developments, most notably the Hermitage Bay hotel which is considered to be one of the leading resorts in the Caribbean. It is a recommended investment area by the Citizenship by Investment Programme.
