= National parks of Antigua and Barbuda =

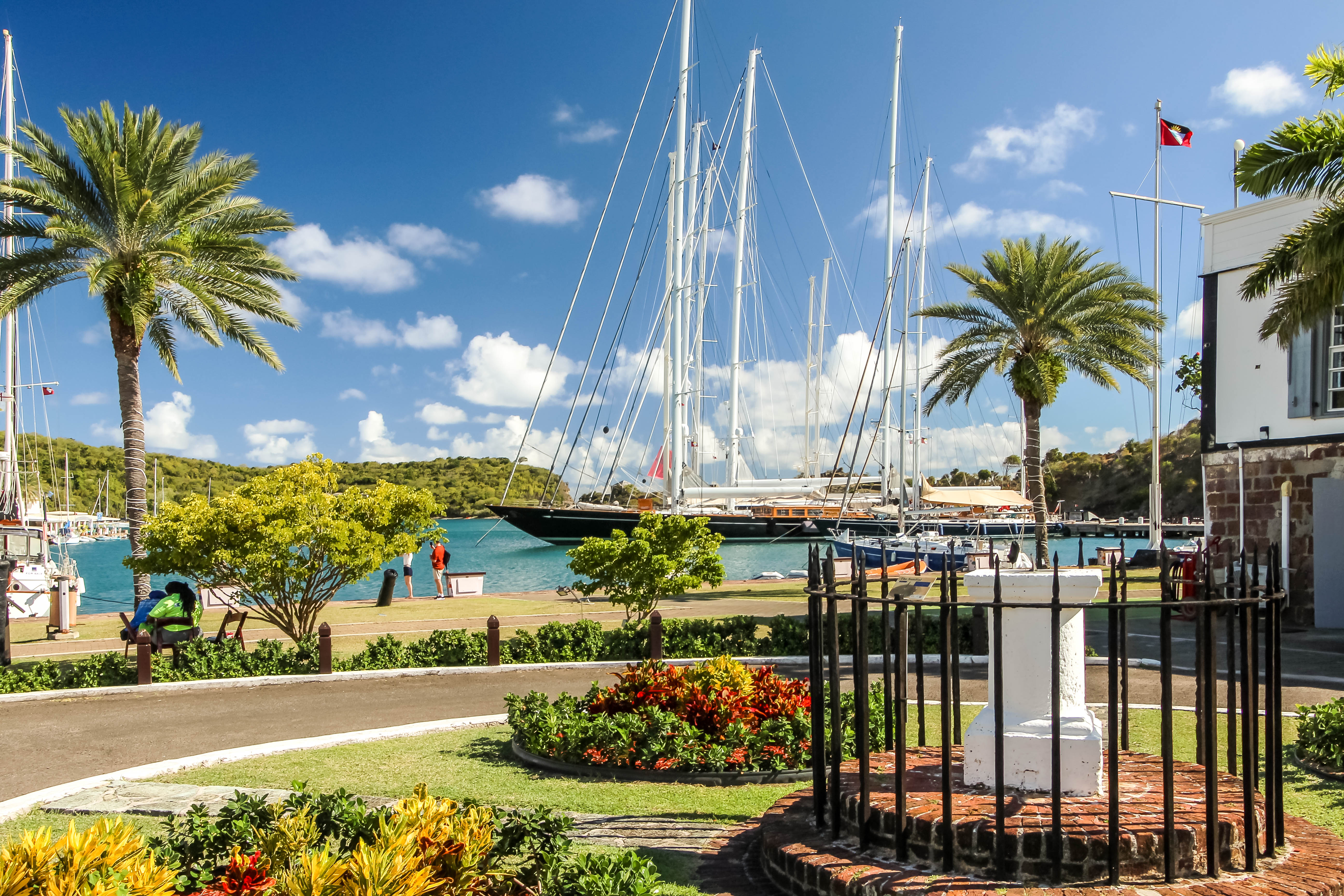
Nelson's Dockyard is the oldest national park in the country

The national parks of Antigua and Barbuda are the four areas deemed by the parliament of Antigua and Barbuda to be of immense national value and worthy of protection. National parks in the country are overseen by the National Parks Authority, an agency within the Antiguan and Barbudan government responsible for the preservation of natural beauty within these parks, the encouragement of sustainable tourism and related amenities, and the general oversight of these areas. In national parks, human activity is heavily regulated, including permanent residence, sport and play, usage of vehicles and watercraft, and related activities.

== List ==
Name	Image	Parish	Area	Date established
Nelson's Dockyard National Park		Saint Paul	630 ac	13 December 1984
Devil's Bridge National Park		Saint Philip	245 ac	22 August 2008
Fort Barrington National Park		Saint John	85 ac	22 August 2008
Green Castle Hill National Park		Saint John	86 ac	22 August 2008

== See also ==
- Forest reserve (Antigua and Barbuda)
