= Mount Carmel (Antigua) =

Mountain in Antigua and Barbuda

- Location within Antigua and Barbuda

Highest point
- Elevation: 126 m (413 ft)
- Prominence: 8 m (26 ft)
- Coordinates: 17°00′41.22″N 61°49′10.50″W

Geography
- Location: Antigua and Barbuda
- Parent range: Shekerley Mountains

Mount Carmel is one of the Shekerley Mountains of Saint Mary, Antigua and Barbuda. It has an elevation of 126 m (413 ft) and 8 m (26 ft) of prominence. It is located to the south of Fisher Hill.
