= University of the West Indies (disambiguation) =

The University of the West Indies or UWI is a regional university system scattered across the Caribbean region. It may also refer to the flagship unit in Mona, Jamaica (UWI Mona).

The University of the West Indies may also refer to the following:

- University of the West Indies at Cave Hill located in Barbados
- University of the West Indies at St. Augustine located in Trinidad and Tobago
- University of the West Indies at Five Islands located in Antigua and Barbuda
- University of the West Indies Open Campus headquartered in Barbados, with several centers scaterred across the Caribbean

== See also ==
- University of the French Antilles
