= Pigeon Point, English Harbour =

Location in English Harbour

Coordinates: 17°0′35.46″N 61°46′32.16″W

Pigeon Point is a beach and location in English Harbour. It is located on the Middle Ground peninsula, which separates Falmouth Harbour from Freeman's Bay, the two natural ports of the town. It is located on the west side of the peninsula, at the mouth of Falmouth Bay, and extends in a crescent from Pigeon Point in the north to Blake's Point in the south.

Like many of Antigua's beaches, it is a tree-lined beach with white sand. It is easily accessible from downtown and is one of the island's popular weekend beaches. It has small infrastructure such as showers, playground and a beach bar. In 1984, it was integrated into Nelson's Dockyard National Park, which is the largest national park on the island at over 40 km². In 1988, it was declared closed to private development by the government along with seven other beaches.

The Middle Ground Trail stretches from Fort Berkeley to Nelson's Dockyard on the other side of the peninsula.
