= Forest reserve (Antigua and Barbuda) =

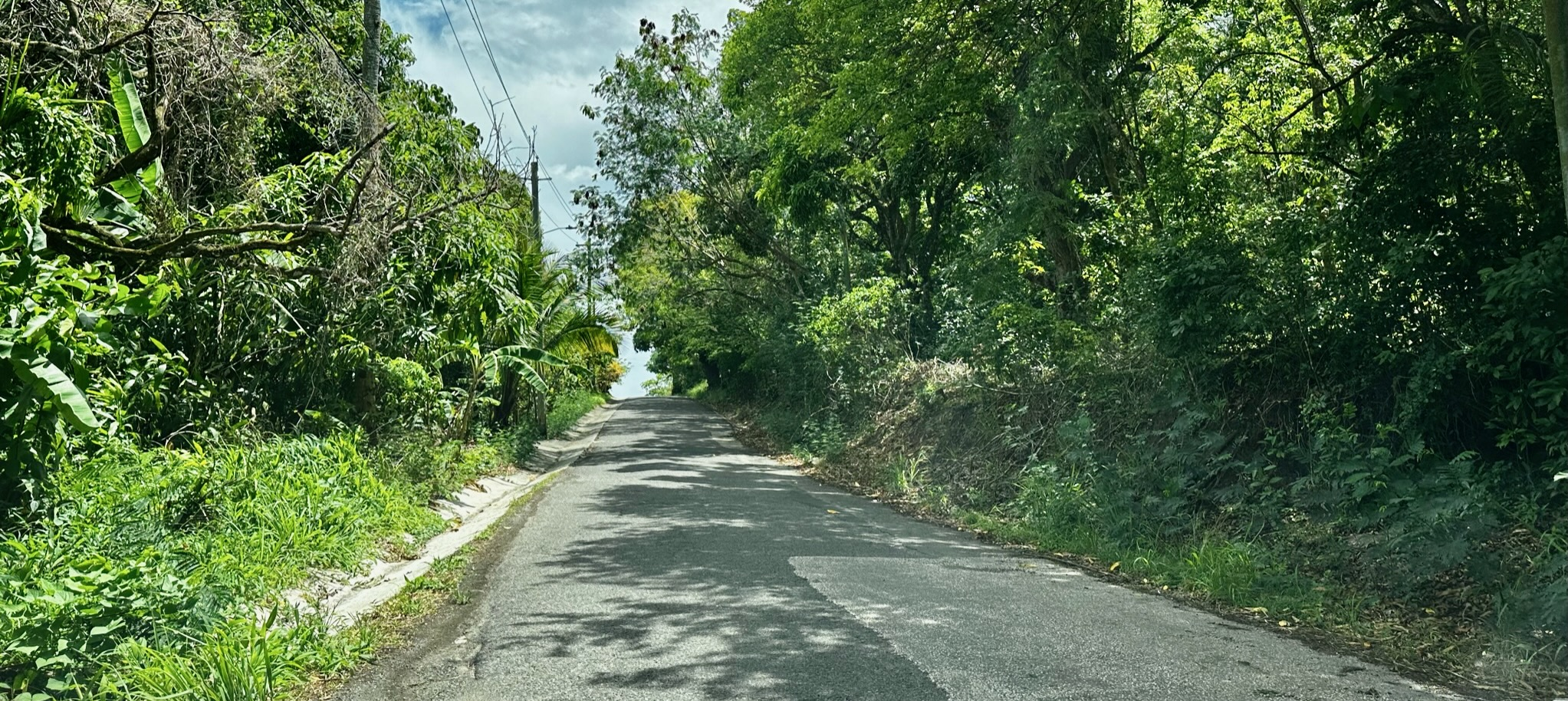
Wallings, the only community-managed forest reserve in the country

Antigua and Barbuda has seven official forest reserves, including six on Antigua, one on Redonda, and none on Barbuda. Antigua and Barbuda has legally had a system of forest reserves since June 1941, with the passing of the Forestry Act. Forest reserves are under the supervision of the country's environmental director. The governor-general may appoint subordinate forest officers responsible for enforcing environmental legislation in these reserves. The minister with responsibility for agriculture may declare any forest or adjacent property to be part of a reserve. These reserves are intended to preserve the local environment and prevent deforestation.

== List ==
Name	Island	Location	Official description
Christian Valley	Antigua	17°03′13.7″N 61°51′03.3″W	Biodiverse area
Body Ponds	Antigua	17°03′43.3″N 61°49′10.5″W	Biodiverse area, water resources
Redonda	Redonda	16°56′18″N 62°20′42″W	Wildlife
Sugar Loaf	Antigua	17°01′58.7″N 61°47′01.3″W	Biodiverse area
Black Ghaut	Antigua	17°04′06.9″N 61°43′42.4″W	Wetland
Gaynors	Antigua	17°04′06.3″N 61°43′08.2″W	Biodiverse area
Wallings	Antigua	17°02′17.2″N 61°49′27.6″W	Biodiverse area

== See also ==
- National parks of Antigua and Barbuda
