= Wallings Reservoir =

Reservoir in Saint Mary, Antigua and Barbuda

- Interactive map of Wallings Reservoir
- Location: Wallings, Saint Mary, Antigua and Barbuda
- Coordinates: 17°2′7.21″N 61°49′30.51″W
- Type: Reservoir
- Built: 1890
- First flooded: 1900

Wallings Reservoir is a reservoir located in the Wallings Forest of Saint Mary, Antigua and Barbuda, near John Hughes.

Construction began in 1890, initially designed to hold 13 million gallons of water sourced from the valleys and aquifers of the surrounding Shekerley Mountains. Many who worked on its construction were migrants from nearby islands. Eventually, it came to be a major regional water source, supporting fifteen villages. After a drought starting in 1909, the reservoir was empty for three years until 1912. In 1945, a second, smaller dam was built nearby.

The reservoir and the surrounding forest are an Important Bird Area. There are also several plant species present including mango, banana, ironwood, and white cedar.
