= Five Islands, Antigua and Barbuda =

Five Islands
- Village
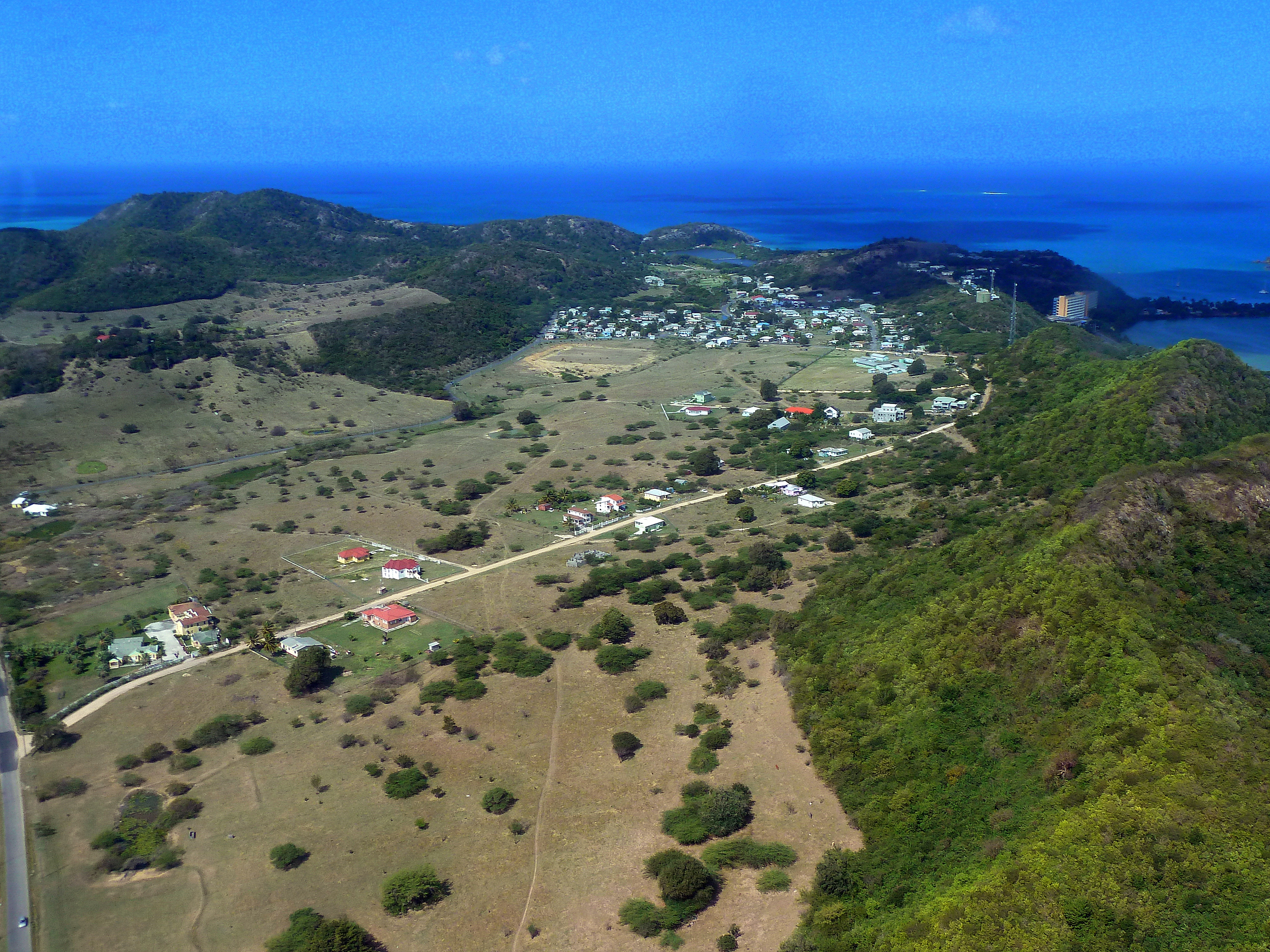
- Aerial view of Five Islands in 2012
- Interactive map of the Five Islands main place
- Location within Antigua
- Coordinates: 17°07′09.10″N 61°52′58.20″W
- Country: Antigua and Barbuda
- Island: Antigua
- Parish: Saint John

Area
  - Total: 3.65 km^{2} (1.41 sq mi)

Population (2011)
  - Total: 337
  - Density: 92.32/km^{2} (239.1/sq mi)
- Time zone: UTC-4 (AST)

Five Islands is a village in Saint John, Antigua and Barbuda. It is located on a small peninsula in the far west of Antigua, east of the St. John's, Antigua and Barbuda urban area. The village had a population of 337 in 2011 and a total area of 3.65 square kilometres. It is bounded by Yeptons to the north and Five Islands Harbour to the south.

Once known as Galley Bay Village, it was the site of the Five Islands Plantations, a pair of sugar plantations founded in the late seventeenth century. The village eventually transitioned from agriculture to tourism, struggling with poor infrastructure, water resources, and relative isolation from the rest of the island. During the transition, the village also toyed with the idea of industrialisation. Today, the village is home to several famous beaches and a campus of the University of the West Indies. The village was named for the five rock islands in the harbour and is connected to St. John's by a single road. The village also had a long relationship with the Moravian Church that reflects in the village's modern demographics.

== Geography ==
According to the National Bureau of Statistics, Five Islands has an area of 3.65 square kilometres. The village's northeast is covered by a thin patch of tropical forest that extends into Yeptons. Just south of this forest is land mostly used for improved grazing. The northeastern area also contains the densest rural settlement which is entirely surrounded by this improved grazing land. The southeastern part of the village is mostly covered by improved grazing and The Flashes. The western part of the village is covered by a thick tropical forest with some salt ponds, mangroves, and tourism developments near the coast. There are several waterbodies in the village, including some of the largest ponds on the island. The village is located in the Ottos and Rough Mountain soil series. The Ottos series is composed of mostly brown clay soil, with the surface being stiff and grey. There is some alkaline in the soil, especially at lower levels. The series was originally covered in low forest and scrubland and today is mostly covered in dense grasses. The Rough Mountain series covers parts of the village and has mostly volcanic attributes, as Five Islands is on the cusp of Antigua's volcanic and Central Plain geologic formations. The settled portion of the village is at risk of both landslides and drought.

The village borders Yeptons to the north and east and Five Islands Harbour to the south and west. The village is 4.1 kilometres from downtown St. John's, 4.7 kilometres from Creekside, 5.0 kilometres from Jennings, 5.9 kilometres from Jolly Harbour, and 6.0 kilometres from central Bolans. It is 10.1 kilometres from the nearest international air service at V. C. Bird International Airport. Notable hydrographic features include Hansons Bay, Five Islands Harbour, Pinching Bay, and Hawksbill Bay. Gray's Farm Main Road links the peninsula to the rest of Antigua.

== History ==
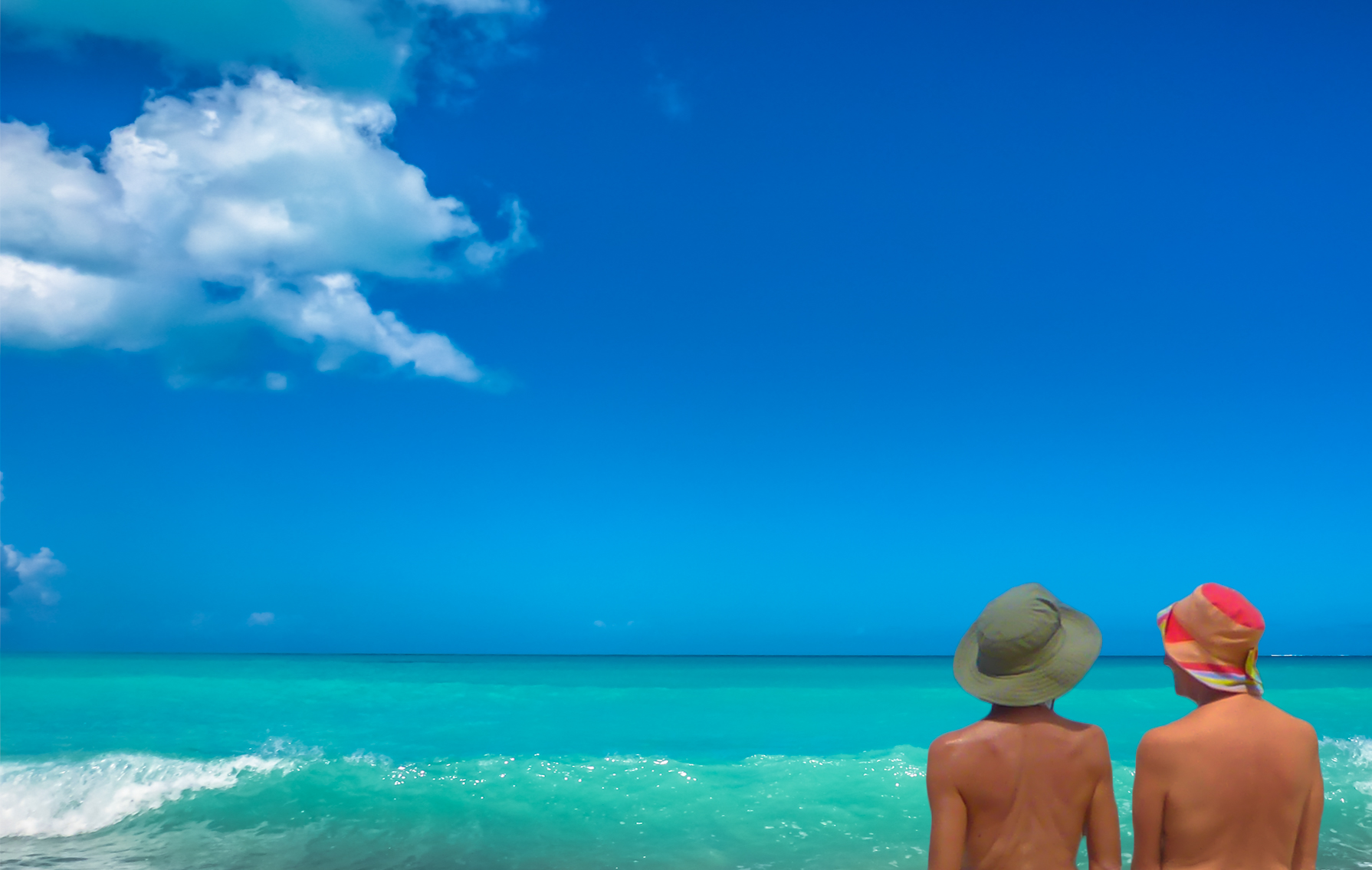
Eden Beach near Five Islands Village.

The Five Islands Plantations were some of the oldest in colonial Antigua, established in the seventeenth century. It was located in the Five Islands Division, one of the second-level administrative divisions of the parish of Saint John. A nearby plantation, Hawksbill, was also the site of an Antiguan legislative assembly meeting in 1649.

Thomas Turner and John Bridges likely owned the Five Islands Plantations in the 1660s, before it was listed as property of Robert Carden in 1668. Carden sold 300 acres of the plantation for £14,000 in 1678, in addition to 80 acres that went to Samuel Martin. In 1679, another 100 acres, also possibly associated with Five Islands, were sold to Thomas Dipford and John Mitchell. After 1707, Scottish settlers formed the largest group of new European arrivals on the island, establishing several powerful families including that of Walter Sydserf, who owned the plantations in 1750. In 1763 the estate was inherited by William Thomas, and the Thomases owned the estate until 1872 when it was passed on to Stephen J. Hill. In 1829, the estate contained 703 acres and 215 slaves. It was at this time that tamarind trees grew here, many of which were harvested and shipped overseas. The estate's owners were given £3,589. 15s. 1p. by the government for the liberation of 250 enslaved people in 1833. In the 1856 census, the area was listed as Galley Bay and had a population of 367– 190 men and 177 women in 52 households. Dozens more were living on the various surrounding estates. During the American Civil War, Five Islands benefitted from increased cotton prices.

On 30 March 1872 one road, listed simply as "Five Islands road", was named as being the main transport link in to village. On 13 February 1873, the plantations' estate house was put up for auction. On 21 June 1873, a news report noted that the Five Islands road was "fair" up until it reached Yeptons Hill when it began to deteriorate in condition, although it was still considered to be passable.

In April 1882, a labourer named Baptist Daniel was charged with setting a cane field on fire at one of the plantations. A Mr. Russel notice the flames and called for help. Daniel was later released however due to a lack of evidence. Around this time, local auctions would often be held at the dwelling house on the plantation. On 30 July 1885 the public pond in Five Islands was mentioned as being completely cleaned out. It was also in the summer of 1885 that the Five Islands area was experiencing a drought– while the rest of the island was experiencing relatively good rains, by 31 July Five Islands had only experienced about eight inches of rain. Many of the ponds were also described as being dry and some people in the area were profiting off of transporting water between nearby ponds and the village. The village also lost much of its livestock. The recent pond-cleaning was noted as not solving many of the village's water issues and the spring at Galley Bay which many people on the peninsula relied on was deemed too salty. A ghaut, which usually only passed over the main road in the rainy seasons, was known to have damaged it as an apparent result of its removal from the list of scheduled roads. By December 1885 proposals were in place to reinstate the road's scheduled status. In January 1888, the sloop Breeze, carrying ice, wrecked and was destroyed on Weymouth Reef and the crew was forced to make a difficult escape to Five Islands. In July 1889, local resident C. Daniell was praised by the Antigua Teachers' Association for her essay Perseverance. The Moravian Church was active in Five Islands throughout this era, and the village had a school once overseen by Port Christopher.

In July 1893, the Five Islands plantations were described as being managed as an outstation of the Greenbay estate. In May 1895 Five Islands was mentioned as being in a water shortage. In 1895 there were also talks of including the Five Islands peninsula in a proposed light railway connecting St. John's and English Harbour. Some also argued during this time that Five Islands Harbour should have been the location of a major industrial centre on Antigua, a status that was instead given to St. John's when it was laid out in the seventeenth century. Five Islands was devastated in an August 1899 hurricane, with several historic sites destroyed along with the deaths of horses and cattle. In total, 12 homes were destroyed.

In June 1906, the ponds in Five Islands were described by one local resident as being filled with weeds. Local roads were also described as being mucky after rainfall and the village was noted to be in drought. In the 1910s, several events were known to be hosted in the village, including the Five Islands Mission Festival, the Love Feast, and the Sacred Concert. An anonymous traveller to the village said in November 1911 "[i]t was a long time since I had been to Five Islands, but never before over such a nasty mucky road". On 31 October 1912, colonial governor Hesketh Bell visited the village by automobile to inspect the harbour.

The Five Islands peninsula area has had an elected parliamentary constituency, St. John's Rural West, as early as the 1951 general election. Historically, it has been one of the stronger areas for the United Progressive Party and its precursors. In 1970, the village and its environs had a population of 378. In 1991 the village had a population of 316, and in 2001 it had a population of 395. In 2019, the University of the West Indies opened a campus in the village that was originally intended to be a public school. The campus is currently set to receive a large, Saudi-funded expansion starting in 2026 that will reshape the village's appearance. If completed, it will be one of the largest university campuses in the Caribbean.

== Demographics ==
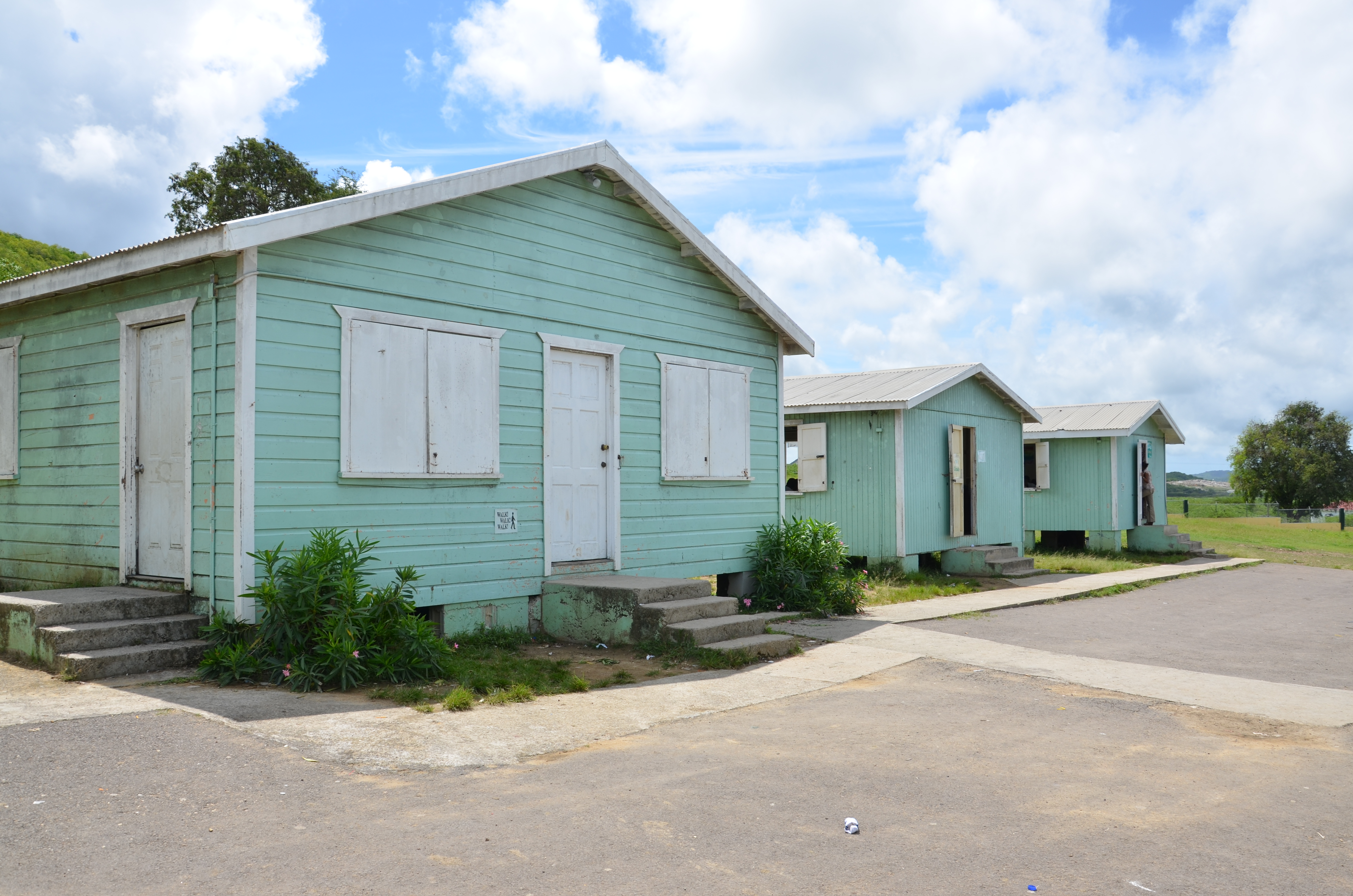
Five Islands Primary School

As of 2011, the village had a population of 337. 96.39% of the population were African descendants, 1.97% were 'other mixed', 0.98% unknown, and 0.66% were 'other'. 81.64% of the population was born in Antigua and Barbuda: of them, 8.84% had lived abroad at some point in their life. Other countries of birth included Dominica (7.87%), Guyana (2.62%), the United States (1.64%), and Saint Vincent and the Grenadines (1.64%). Major religious groups included Moravians (51.32%) and Pentecostalists (16.89%). A 2007 report noted that many Five Islanders struggled to access distant pharmacies in the St. John's area.

In 2011, Five Islands had 109 households. Based on the main material of outer walls, homes were most commonly constructed with wood (40.37%), a combination of wood and concrete (24.77%), concrete (24.77%), and concrete blocks (7.34%). 55.96% of homes had sheet metal roofs and 42.20% had wood shingles.

== Features ==
There is one primary school, Five Islands Primary School, in the village. The University of the West Indies opened its fourth physical campus at Five Islands in 2019, serving Antigua and Barbuda and other Eastern Caribbean countries. There are a few restaurants in the village and a Moravian church that has a graveyard. There are also several villas and cottages, although most tourism on the peninsula takes place in a resort area just north of the village in Yeptons. There are also several trails and hills in the area, including Mount Thomas and Table Hill.
