= Sage Hill (Antigua) =

Mountain in Antigua and Barbuda

- Location within Antigua and Barbuda

Highest point
- Elevation: 349 m (1,145 ft)
- Coordinates: 17°02′43.1″N 61°50′18.3″W

Geography
- Location: Antigua and Barbuda
- Parent range: Shekerley Mountains

Sage Hill is a mountain and the third highest point in Antigua and Barbuda. Located in the Shekerley Mountains of Saint Mary, the hill overlooks the settlement of Sawcolts as well as the Christian Valley. Sage Hill is home to the ruins of a sugar estate that was centered around one of the most valuable springs on the water-scarce island. The estate's mill tower continues to stand and the estate was home to 125 enslaved individuals at the time of emancipation in 1833. The hill has an elevation of 349 metres (1,145 feet). The hill is located in the island's volcanic region.
