= Parrys Hill =

Mountain in Antigua and Barbuda

- Location within Antigua and Barbuda

Highest point
- Elevation: 93 m (305 ft)
- Prominence: 59 m (194 ft)
- Coordinates: 17°04′16.35″N 61°45′35.09″W

Geography
- Location: Antigua and Barbuda
- Parent range: Shekerley Mountains

Parrys Hill is the highest point in Saint Peter, Antigua and Barbuda. It has an elevation of 93 m (305 ft) and a prominence of 59 m (194 ft). It is located near Parrys, south of Pares.
