= Green Castle, Antigua and Barbuda =

Coordinates: 17°4′37″N 61°50′15″W

Green Castle
- Village
- A lot in the village, 2026
- Interactive map of the Green Castle main place
- Country: Antigua and Barbuda
- Parish: Saint John

Area
  - Total: 0.76 km^{2} (0.29 sq mi)

Population (2011)
  - Total: 243

Green Castle is a village in Saint John, Antigua and Barbuda. It had a population of 243 people in 2011. Some residents consider it to be a neighbourhood of Bendals.

== Geography ==
According to the Antigua and Barbuda Statistics Division, the village had a total area of 0.76 square kilometres in 2011. It is located near Green Castle Hill, a national park.

== Demographics ==
There were 243 people living in Green Castle as of the 2011 census. The village was 96.36% African, 0.91% East Indian (India), 0.91% mixed black/white, 0.91% other, and 0.91% not stated. The population was born in different countries, including 71.36% in Antigua and Barbuda, 10.45% in Jamaica and 5.45% in Guyana. The population had diverse religious affiliations, including 19.44% Anglican, 19.44% Evangelical, 17.59% Adventist and 12.96% irreligious. There is also a sizable Rastafarian minority at 6.02%.
