= Botts Peak =

Mountain in Antigua and Barbuda

- Location within Antigua and Barbuda

Highest point
- Elevation: 325 m (1,066 ft)
- Prominence: 30 m (98 ft)
- Coordinates: 17°03′06.60″N 61°51′49.54″W

Geography
- Location: Antigua and Barbuda
- Parent range: Shekerley Mountains

Botts Peak is one of the Shekerley Mountains of Saint Mary, Antigua and Barbuda. It has an elevation of 325 m (1,066 ft) and 30 m (98 ft) of prominence. It overlooks Bolans.
