= McNish Mountain =

Mountain in Antigua and Barbuda

- Location within Antigua and Barbuda

Highest point
- Elevation: 339 m (1,112 ft)
- Prominence: 59 m (194 ft)
- Coordinates: 17°03′30.0″N 61°50′33.6″W

Geography
- Location: Antigua and Barbuda
- Parent range: Shekerley Mountains

McNish Mountain, also known as Table Mountain, is located in Saint John, Antigua and Barbuda. The mountain is visible from the village of Buckleys and straddles the border between Saint John and Saint Mary. It is part of the Shekerley Mountains and is located in the island's volcanic suite. On the mountain is a fevergrass meadow and a signal tower.

The mountain is located in a tropical forest, at the northernmost extent of the Leeward Islands moist forests on the island. The mountain has clay loam soil experiencing severe erosion– all topsoil has been eroded and only some subsoil remains. On the mountain was Allen's Plantation, which has a standing but abandoned sugar mill. The area has views of St. John's and can only be reached by a difficult climb. There is a small salt pond in the area.

The village of Hamiltons was once located around here but it since has been abandoned.
