= Bathlodge =

Coordinates: 17°5′16″N 61°49′49″W

- Village
- Interactive map of Bathlodge
- Country: Antigua and Barbuda
- Parish: Saint John

Area
  - Total: 1.04 km^{2} (0.40 sq mi)

Population (2011)
  - Total: 314

Bathlodge is a village in Saint John, Antigua and Barbuda. It had a population of 314 people in 2011. Some residents consider it to be a neighbourhood of Bendals.

== Geography ==
According to the Antigua and Barbuda Statistics Division, the village had a total area of 1.04 square kilometres in 2011.

== Demographics ==
There were 314 people living in Bathlodge as of the 2011 census. The village was 96.13% African, 2.82% other mixed, 0.70% other, and 0.35% unknown. The population was born in many different countries, including 74.65% in Antigua and Barbuda, 7.04% in Guyana, and 5.28% in the United States. The population had diverse religious affiliations, including 26.15% Pentecostal and 19.79% Anglican.
