= Sawcolts =

- Settlement
- Location within Antigua Location within Antigua and Barbuda Location within the Caribbean
- Country: Antigua and Barbuda
- Parish: Saint Mary Parish
- Community: John Hughes

Sawcolts is a small settlement in the southwest of the island of Antigua. It is located to the east of Sage Hill in the Shekerley Mountains, the low range which skirts the island's southeastern coastline. The township is located to the north of Fig Tree Drive, the scenic route which connects Swetes and the south coast at Old Road. For census purposes, it is included within John Hughes.
