= Bermudian Valley Division =

Division of Antigua

Bermudian Valley
- Division
- Coordinates: 17°3′57″N 61°52′26″W
- Country: Antigua and Barbuda
- Parish: Saint Mary

Bermudian Valley is a division of Saint Mary, Antigua and Barbuda. It was named after the former trade town of Bermudian Valley. Today, it contains the largest settlement in the parish, Bolans, and its environs. The division was sometimes known as simply the Valley Division.
