= Sugar Loaf Mountain (Antigua) =

Mountain in Antigua and Barbuda

- Location within Antigua and Barbuda

Highest point
- Elevation: 309 m (1,014 ft)
- Prominence: 122 m (400 ft)
- Coordinates: 17°1′28.47″N 61°47′51.61″W

Geography
- Location: Antigua and Barbuda
- Parent range: Shekerley Mountains

Sugar Loaf Mountain is one of the Shekerley Mountains of Saint Paul, Antigua and Barbuda, near the small settlement of Dieppe Bay. It is located in the continuous stretch of forest between Old Road and the Central Plain, one of the easternmost parts of the Antiguan volcanic suite. It is the fifth highest mountain on the island and it is known for its views over Falmouth Harbour. It is a relatively short hike but is quite steep with several different routes. The mountain is the source of two ghauts: one flowing into Rendezvous Bay and one flowing into Falmouth Harbour. It stands at an elevation of 309 metres.
