= St. Luke, Antigua and Barbuda =

St. Luke
- Former village
- The area c. 1902

- Location within Antigua
- Coordinates: 17°04′30.07″N 61°50′04.00″W
- Country: Antigua and Barbuda
- Parish: Saint John

St. Luke was a village in the Bendals Valley of Saint John, Antigua and Barbuda. The village was centred around St. Luke's Anglican Church, one of the last functioning buildings in the community. The village has been referenced in the name of the All Saints East and St. Luke constituency since redistricting in 1984. The village's church was an important place of worship for slaves and many were buried at the church cemetery. A 1959 map showed a cluster of now-disappeared buildings around the church.

A schoolhouse was located at the church. The village was located near the Bendals Stream.
