= Cherry Hill (Antigua) =

Mountain in Antigua and Barbuda

- Location within Antigua and Barbuda

Highest point
- Elevation: 172 m (564 ft)
- Prominence: 59 m (194 ft)
- Coordinates: 17°01′09.90″N 61°47′18.20″W

Geography
- Location: Antigua and Barbuda
- Parent range: Shekerley Mountains

Cherry Hill is one of the Shekerley Mountains of Saint Paul, Antigua and Barbuda. It has an elevation of 172 m (564 ft) and 59 m (194 ft) of prominence. It is one of the easternmost hills in the chain.
