= Winter Hill (Antigua) =

Mountain in Antigua and Barbuda

- Location within Antigua and Barbuda

Highest point
- Elevation: 50 m (160 ft)
- Prominence: 19 m (62 ft)
- Coordinates: 17°00′18.03″N 61°49′57.18″W

Geography
- Location: Antigua and Barbuda
- Parent range: Shekerley Mountains

Winter Hill is one of the Shekerley Mountains of Saint Mary, Antigua and Barbuda. It has an elevation of 50 m (164 ft) and 19 m (62 ft) of prominence. It forms a peninsula and overlooks Cades Bay.
