= Ebenezer, Antigua and Barbuda =

Ebenezer
- Village
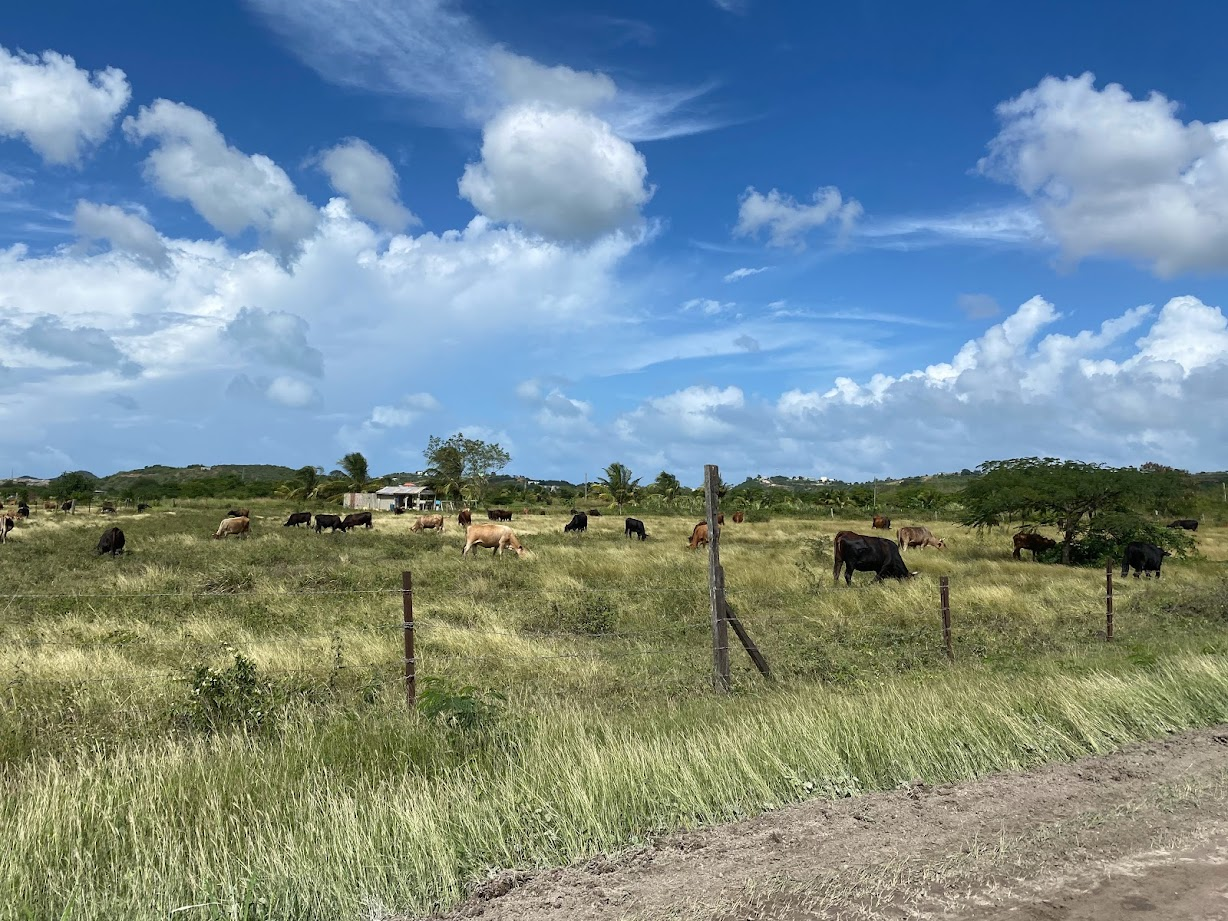
- A farm in Ebenezer on Valley Road
- Interactive map of the Ebenezer main place
- Location within Antigua
- Coordinates: 17°4′46.56″N 61°51′18.61″W
- Country: Antigua and Barbuda
- Island: Antigua
- Parish: Saint Mary
- Major division: Jennings-Ebenezer

Population (2011)
  - Village: 398
  - Metro: 1,603

Ebenezer is a village in Saint Mary Parish, Antigua and Barbuda.

It is located next to the village of Jennings.

== Demographics ==
Ebenezer has two enumeration districts.

- 82300 EbenezerHall
- 82400 Ebenezer-GreenHill

=== Census data (2011) ===
Q48 Ethnic	Counts	%
African descendent	352	88.33%
Caucasian/White	14	3.45%
East Indian/India	1	0.27%
Mixed (Black/White)	3	0.80%
Mixed (Other)	10	2.39%
Hispanic	7	1.86%
Other	2	0.53%
Don't know/Not stated	10	2.39%
Total	398	100.00%

Q49 Religion	Counts	%
Adventist	78	19.68%
Anglican	13	3.19%
Baptist	4	1.06%
Church of God	21	5.32%
Evangelical	5	1.33%
Methodist	1	0.27%
Moravian	162	40.69%
None/no religion	23	5.85%
Pentecostal	14	3.46%
Rastafarian	6	1.60%
Roman Catholic	30	7.45%
Weslyan Holiness	1	0.27%
Other	27	6.91%
Don't know/Not stated	12	2.93%
Total	397	100.00%
NotApp :	1	

Q55 Internet use	Counts	%
Yes	153	38.46%
No	242	60.74%
Don't know/Not stated	3	0.80%
Total	398	100.00%

Q58. Country of birth	Counts	%
Antigua and Barbuda	305	76.66%
Other Caribbean countries	2	0.53%
Canada	2	0.53%
Dominica	13	3.18%
Dominican Republic	5	1.33%
Guyana	20	5.04%
Jamaica	8	2.12%
Monsterrat	1	0.27%
St. Kitts and Nevis	1	0.27%
St. Lucia	1	0.27%
St. Vincent and the Grenadines	1	0.27%
Trinidad and Tobago	4	1.06%
United Kingdom	4	1.06%
USA	11	2.65%
USVI United States Virgin Islands	4	1.06%
Not Stated	15	3.71%
Total	398	100.00%

Q71 Country of citizenship 1	Counts	%
Antigua and Barbuda	337	84.62%
Other Caribbean countries	2	0.53%
Canada	1	0.27%
Dominica	11	2.65%
Dominican Republic	1	0.27%
Guyana	18	4.51%
Jamaica	7	1.86%
Monsterrat	1	0.27%
Trinidad and Tobago	1	0.27%
United Kingdom	1	0.27%
USA	5	1.33%
Not Stated	13	3.18%
Total	398	100.00%

Q71 Country of citizenship 2 (country of second citizenship)	Counts	%
Other Caribbean countries	4	9.76%
Canada	1	2.44%
Dominica	2	4.88%
Dominican Republic	4	9.76%
Guyana	2	4.88%
Jamaica	1	2.44%
St. Lucia	2	4.88%
St. Vincent and the Grenadines	2	4.88%
Trinidad and Tobago	1	2.44%
United Kingdom	5	12.20%
USA	18	41.46%
Total	43	100.00%
NotApp :	355	

Q75 Educational level	Counts	%
None	18	4.51%
Day care	18	4.51%
Pre-school	24	6.10%
Infant/Kindergarten	5	1.33%
Primary/elementary (1-3)	20	5.04%
Primary/elementary (4-7)	50	12.47%
Junior Secondary	10	2.39%
Secondary (Form 1–3)	27	6.90%
Secondary (Form 4–5)	133	33.42%
Sixth Form (A'Level) - Upper	1	0.27%
Post Secondary	4	1.06%
Post Sec/Pre-University/College	14	3.45%
Post Primary - Vocational/Trade	26	6.63%
Special School/Education	1	0.27%
University	18	4.51%
Other	2	0.53%
Don't know/Not stated	26	6.63%
Total	398	100.00%

Q73 Institution attending	Counts	%
Daycare	5	4.72%
Preschool	16	14.15%
Gov. or Gov. Assisted Primary School	31	27.36%
Private Primary School	14	12.26%
Secondary	27	24.53%
Community/State College (inc. Sixth Form and Post Secondary)	7	6.60%
Adult education	3	2.83%
University	5	4.72%
Other (inc. Special Education)	3	2.83%
Total	112	100.00%
NotApp :	286	

Q82 Training qualification	Counts	%
None	44	34.43%
Certificate with examination	49	37.70%
Certificate without exam	21	16.39%
Diploma or Advanced Diploma	2	1.64%
First degree or Post Graduate Degree	2	1.64%
Professional Qualification	2	1.64%
Don't know/Not stated	8	6.56%
Total	129	100.00%
NotApp :	269	

Q117 MoneyOverseas (money from friends and relatives overseas)	Counts	%
Under 100 EC$	290	96.83%
100 to 499 EC$	2	0.70%
500 to 999 EC$	5	1.76%
2,000 to 4,999 EC$	2	0.70%
Total	300	100.00%
NotApp :	98	

Q76 Examination	Counts	%
None	150	37.67%
School leaving Certificate	67	16.71%
High School Certificate (HSC)	20	5.04%
Cambridge School /CXC	24	6.10%
GCE 'O' level/CXC General	57	14.32%
GCE 'A' Levels, CAPE	2	0.53%
College certificate	8	2.12%
Associate Degree	6	1.59%
Batchelor's Degree	12	2.92%
Professional Certificate	4	1.06%
Master's or Doctoral Degree	1	0.27%
Other	2	0.53%
Don't know/Not stated	44	11.14%
Total	398	100.00%

Q116.13 Unemployment benefits	Counts	%
Yes	1	0.35%
No	295	97.89%
Not stated	5	1.75%
Total	301	100.00%
NotApp :	97	

Q116.2 Employment (includes those under 15)	Counts	%
Yes	173	57.54%
No	123	40.70%
Not stated	5	1.75%
Total	301	100.00%
NotApp :	97	

Q91 Business earning	Counts	%
Under $1,000 EC per month	10	33.33%
1,000 to $1,999 EC per month	3	11.11%
2,000 to $2,999 EC per month	3	11.11%
3,000 to $4,999 EC per month	5	18.52%
$5,000 EC and over per month	7	25.93%
Total	29	100.00%
NotApp :	363	
Missing :	6	
