= Spring Hill (Antigua) =

Mountain in Antigua and Barbuda

- Location within Antigua and Barbuda

Highest point
- Elevation: 128 m (420 ft)
- Prominence: 8 m (26 ft)
- Coordinates: 17°01′41.97″N 61°47′31.33″W

Geography
- Location: Antigua and Barbuda
- Parent range: Shekerley Mountains

Spring Hill is one of the Shekerley Mountains of Saint Paul, Antigua and Barbuda. It has an elevation of 128 m (420 ft) and 8 m (26 ft) of prominence. It overlooks the Central Plain.

A village was once located here with a population of 116 in 1856.
