= The Flashes (Antigua) =

Protected wetland in Antigua and Barbuda

- Location within Antigua
- Location: Antigua and Barbuda
- Nearest city: Ebenezer, Saint Mary
- Coordinates: 17°05′59.2″N 61°52′10.6″W
- Area: 185 ha (460 acres)
- Established: 2019; 7 years ago
- Governing body: National Parks Authority

The Flashes are a protected mangrove wetland in the northern portion of Saint Mary, Antigua and Barbuda in the Halls neighbourhood of Ebenezer. The Flashes are located near Hansons Bay, part of Five Islands Harbour. Cooks Creek passes through The Flashes. The Cooks landfill is also located in the area due to its very low population density. The Flashes are an Important Bird Area. The Flashes are protected under the Environmental Protection and Management Act of 2019, being categorized as an inland wetland, mangrove area, and a scrubland. The protected area covers 185 hectares. 90 species of birds are present in the area including the Cape May warbler and the Prothonotary warbler.
