= Hamiltons, Antigua and Barbuda =

Hamiltons
- Ghost village
- Location within Antigua
- Coordinates: 17°03′39″N 61°50′34″W
- Country: Antigua and Barbuda
- Parish: Saint John
- Division: St. John's

Population (1856)
  - Total: 202

Hamiltons (also known as Hamberly) is a ghost village in Saint John, Antigua and Barbuda. It had a population of 202 in 1856 in 44 houses. The village was founded by emancipated slaves in 1834, named after a property granted to John Hamilton in 1679. Located in a small salient of the parish of Saint John, the area in 1775 had a small hamlet and a windmill, while a map from 1891 map shows it as the largest village in central Antigua, exceeding the size of All Saints. In 1891 the village had a church named after Saint John.

The village was abandoned in 1950 following extensive damage by Hurricane Dog and Hurricane Baker, and the people of the village were relocated to nearby Emanuel as well as Bendals. At the time of its depopulation the village was home to three families. Due to the village's location between the northern slopes of the Shekerley Mountains, a reservoir was built, although many remnants of the village still remain.
