= Box hand =

Antiguan and Barbudan traditional lending model

Box hand, also known simply as box, is a traditional community lending model in Antigua and Barbuda where members of a community pay into a "box" monthly, and members of the box receive a portion of the total until every member of the box has had at least one turn to withdraw. The model originates from the Yoruba concept of esusu, and the idea has spread throughout the Caribbean. Box hands are often used in charities and among people who have shared common experiences.
