= Green Castle Hill =

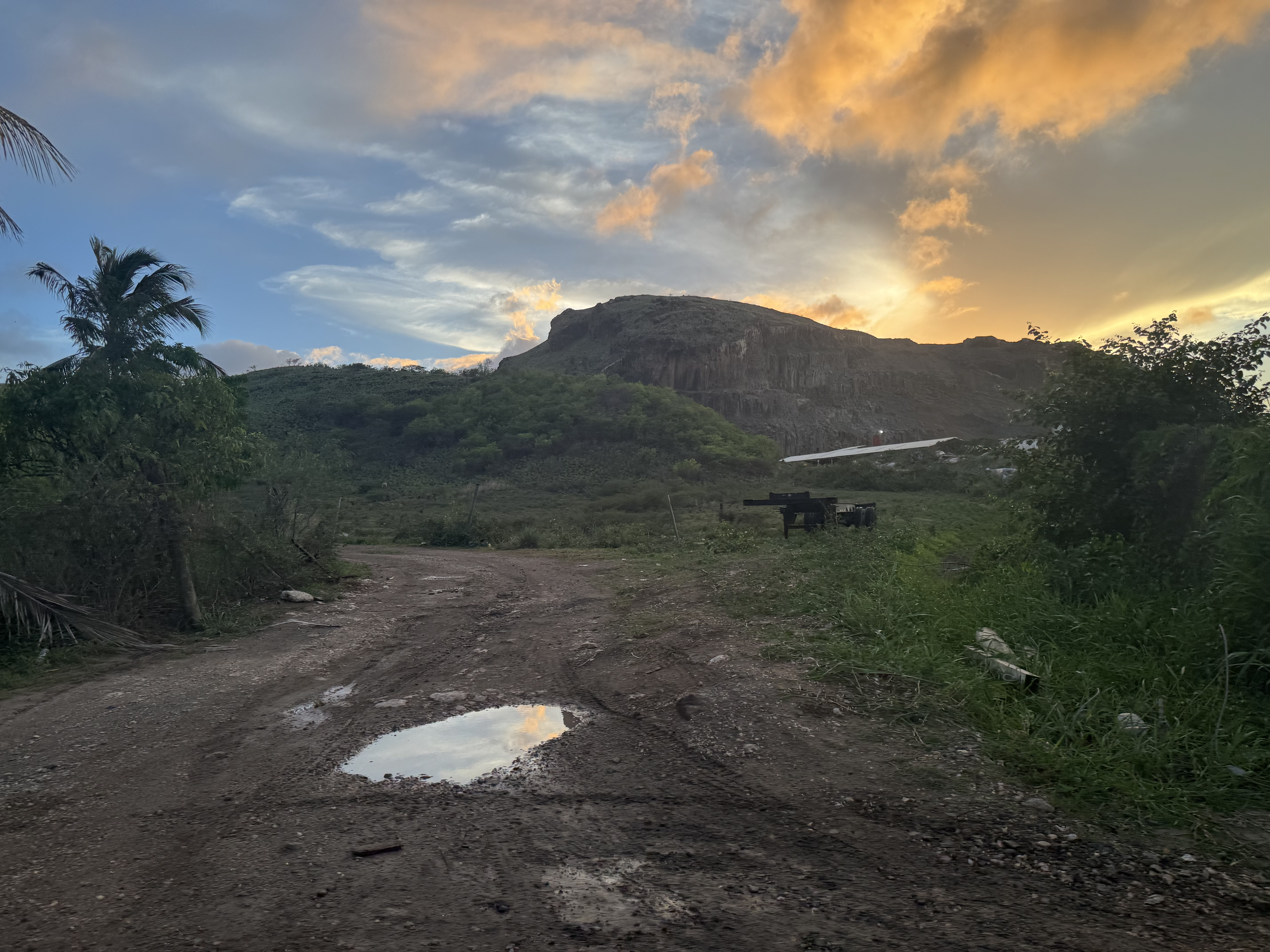
- The hill in August 2026

Highest point
- Elevation: 162 m (531 ft)
- Prominence: 95 m (312 ft)
- Coordinates: 17°4′24.73″N 61°51′1.60″W

Geography
- Location within Antigua and Barbuda
- Location: Antigua and Barbuda
- Parent range: Shekerley Mountains

Green Castle Hill is a hill near Green Castle, Antigua and Barbuda. The site has been considered a national park since 2008, the first protected site in the Shekerley Mountains. Located on the hill is a set of pre-Columbian stone monuments often referred to as "Antigua's Stonehenge". It is likely that this location was used for rituals and observing the night sky. The west coast of Antigua and the Central Plain can be seen from the hill. This area was also home to a sugar plantation that was most notably owned by Samuel Martin. At the time of emancipation in 1834, it was home to 319 slaves.
