= Wallings =

Forest reserve in Antigua

Wallings Nature Reserve
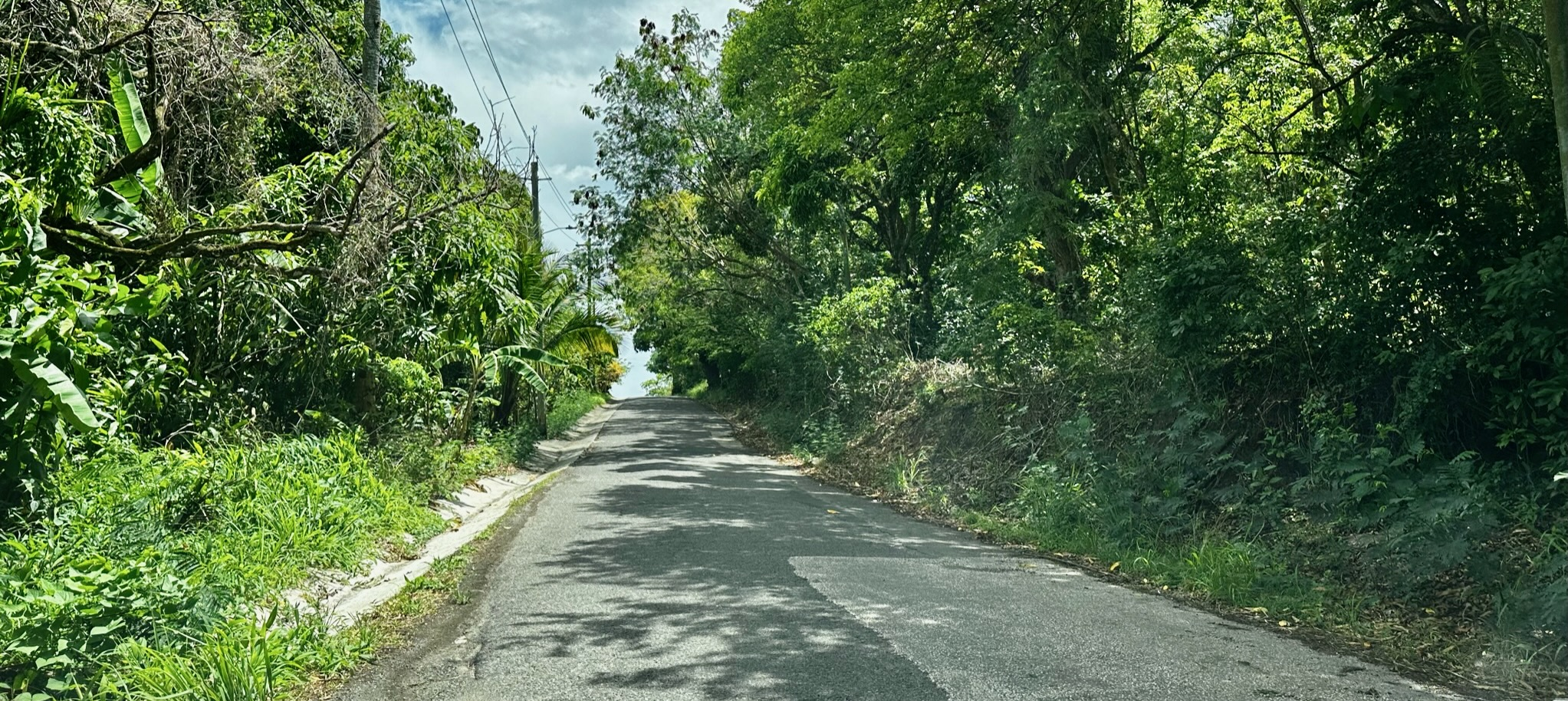
- Fig Tree Drive at the edge of the park

- Location within Antigua
- Location: Antigua and Barbuda
- Nearest city: John Hughes, Saint Mary
- Coordinates: 17°02′17.2″N 61°49′27.6″W
- Established: 2018; 8 years ago
- Governing body: Wallings Nature Reserve, Inc.
- Website: https://wallingsnaturereserve.org

Wallings is a forest and locale located in the Shekerley Mountains of Antigua. Wallings is an official forest reserve located in government lands in the Leeward Islands moist forests. One of seven forest reserves under the Environmental Protection and Management of 2015, the park is intended to protect its unique wildlife and forest cover.

It is an important bird area for Antigua and Barbuda. There are ceramic period artifacts here.

The Wallings Nature Reserve was formally established in 2018 as the first community-run national park in the country. The head office of the park is located in John Hughes. Prior to the establishment of the park, the locality was mostly used for its water resources– a reservoir and dam were constructed here in 1890, as well as another in 1945.
