= Orange Valley (Antigua) =

Official historic site of Antigua and Barbuda

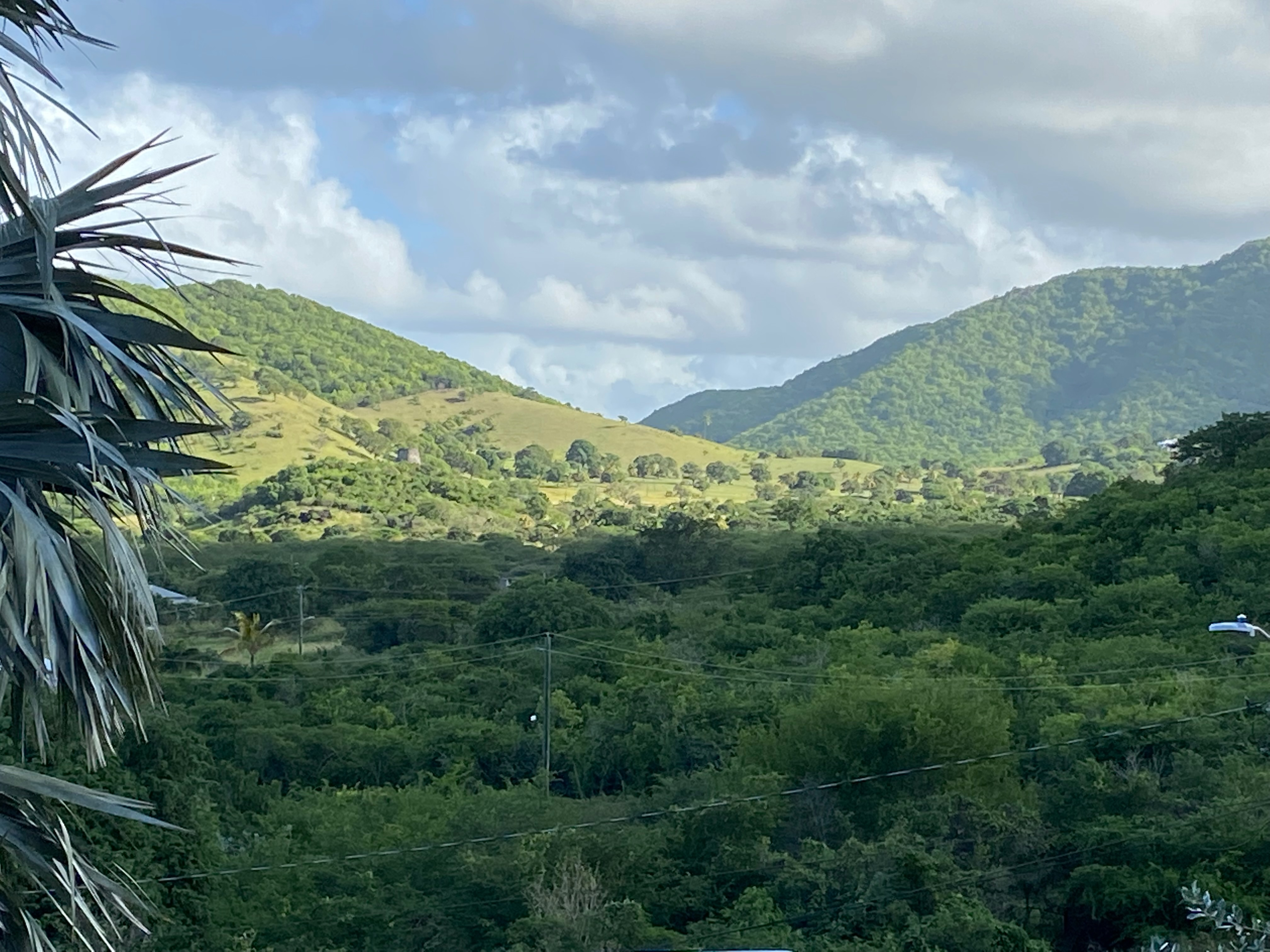
- Orange Valley with mill visible

- Location within Antigua
- 17°02′45.6″N 61°53′00.4″W
- Location: Saint Mary, Antigua and Barbuda

History
- Built: 1750

Historical Site of Antigua and Barbuda

Orange Valley is a valley of the Shekerley Mountains and a historical site of Antigua and Barbuda. The valley is home to Orange Valley Mill, a sugar plantation that was home to 100 enslaved people at the time of emancipation in 1834. The valley is adjacent to the Darkwood Beach swamp, and many churches use this area for camping and ceremonies. The Orange Valley Heliport is located in the area. The former trade town of Bermudian Valley was once located here.
