= University of the West Indies at Five Islands =

Public research university in Five Islands, Antigua and Barbuda

Coordinates: 17°07′08″N 61°52′50″W

- Motto: Oriens Ex Occidente Lux (Latin)
- Motto in English: A Light Rising From The West
- Type: Regional, public, autonomous university
- Established: 2019
- Affiliations: Association of Commonwealth Universities (ACU); Caribbean Community; Association of Atlantic Universities
- Chancellor: Mr. Robert Bermudez
- Vice-Chancellor: Sir Hilary Beckles
- Principal: Professor Densil Williams
- Students: 147
- Undergraduates: 147
- Location: Five Islands, Antigua and Barbuda
Colors
- Website: fiveislands.uwi.edu

The University of the West Indies at Five Islands is a public university in Five Islands, Antigua and Barbuda. It is the newest of 5 general campuses in the University of the West Indies system.

== History ==
Antigua and Barbuda Prime Minister Gaston Browne approached the UWI to establish a campus in the country. In fact, the Prime Minister stated that if the UWI was not willing to be a partner to establish a university in Antigua and Barbuda, he would seek another partner. As the UWI vice-chancellor noted, the post-secondary education participation rate of students of the OECS sub-region was significantly below that of the countries with landed campuses and even the rest of the hemisphere. Data backs up that the average tertiary gross enrolment rates (GER) for Barbados, Jamaica, and Trinidad and Tobago are much higher than the GERs for other contributing countries that do not have a landed campus. Other attempts to establish UWI campuses, such as in Grenada, have been considered but not yet fulfilled.

The ability to complete the first one or two years of a degree or even a full degree in a student's home country is a significant cost saving for the student and the government, where it provides student financial assistance. Positioning the UWI campus at an already constructed complex reduces the needs for new construction, saving the government further money. However, the Prime Minister is continuing to seek funding to expand the campus, including a possible US$20 million donation from China.

On 27 May 2019, the University Finance and General Purposes Committee (UF&GPC) of the UWI System approved the establishment of Five Islands campus. The first group of 147 admitted students were matriculated on 27 September 2019 and are currently pursuing studies in the Schools of Humanities and Education; Management, Sciences and Technology; and Health and Behavioural Sciences.

== Campus ==
The UWI Five Islands campus is sited 7.5 km from the capital, St. John's, co-located with a campus of the Antigua and Barbuda College of Advanced Studies. The building itself was originally built by a Chinese state construction firm for a secondary school that was never opened, due to a change of government. Instead, it was retrofitted and transferred to the college. Built to accommodate up to 750 students, it consists of 6,450 square-metres and has various regular and specialised learning spaces. The college's schools of business, education and nursing are presently located in the complex. As many of these students are enrolled in the first two years of franchised UWI programmes, they will be able to complete their degree programmes without having to leave the country.

== Global initiatives ==
Harvard University has expressed willingness with UWI Five Islands to work out cooperation arrangements that would benefit the university, in acknowledgment of Harvard University's historical relationship with slavery, particularly confronting past injustices and their legacies. The Harvard Law School was founded on an endowment in 1815 that was funded from slavery on the Isaac Royall Jr.’s plantation on Antigua.

== Schools and programmes ==
Tuition for bachelor's degree programmes at UWI Five Islands is the lowest among all the landed units of the UWI System. In an effort to make the university more attractive, the Government of Antigua and Barbuda said it will be offering scholarships to students from across six countries of the Organisation of Eastern Caribbean States (OECS).

Unlike the other landed campuses of the UWI, which have faculties, the Five Islands campus is composed of four schools:

=== School of Humanities and Education ===
- Bachelor of Education
  - Mathematics specialisation
  - Language and Literacy specialisation
  - Curriculum specialisation

=== School of Business and Management ===
- Bachelor of Social Sciences
  - Economics
  - Computer Science
  - Information Technology
  - Accounting
  - Finance
  - Banking
  - Management
  - Marketing
  - Tourism and Hospitality.

=== School of Health and Behavioural Sciences ===
- Bachelor of Nursing

=== School of Science, Computing, and Artificial Intelligence ===
- Bachelor of Computer Science
- Bachelor of Computer Science and Management
- Bachelor of Information Technology
- Bachelor of Data Science, Innovation Management and Computer Science

== See also ==
- University of the West Indies
- Antigua and Barbuda College of Advanced Studies
