= Monks Hill (Antigua) =

Hill of Antigua

- Location within Antigua and Barbuda

Highest point
- Elevation: 211 m (692 ft)
- Prominence: 130 m (430 ft)
- Coordinates: 17°01′48.4″N 61°46′32.2″W

Geography
- Location: Antigua and Barbuda
- Parent range: Shekerley Mountains

Monks Hill is located at the very eastern end of the Shekerley Mountains of Saint Paul, Antigua and Barbuda. Overlooking the town of Falmouth, the hill rises above the Central Plain and Falmouth Harbour. The mountain and Fort George are considered to be a historical site of Antigua and Barbuda.

The mountain is covered by tropical forest and has clay loam soil– this soil has severe erosion and all top soil has been lost along with some subsoil.

Guinea Bush estate, another historic site, was located near the top of the hill.
