= Santa Maria Hill =

Mountain in Antigua and Barbuda

- Location within Antigua and Barbuda

Highest point
- Elevation: 101 m (331 ft)
- Prominence: 76 m (249 ft)
- Coordinates: 17°09′18.89″N 61°49′13.18″W

Geography
- Location: Antigua and Barbuda

Santa Maria Hill is a hill located in the parish of Saint John, Antigua and Barbuda north of the city. It has an elevation of 101 m (331 ft) and a prominence of 76 m (249 ft). Contrary to popular belief, the hill was not named by Christopher Columbus.
