= Mosquito Hill =

Mountain in Antigua and Barbuda

- Location within Antigua and Barbuda

Highest point
- Elevation: 52 m (171 ft)
- Prominence: 47 m (154 ft)
- Coordinates: 17°04′47.79″N 61°53′44.60″W

Geography
- Location: Antigua and Barbuda

Mosquito Hill is a peak located on the Pearns Point peninsula of Saint Mary, Antigua and Barbuda, overlooking Jolly Harbour. The hill has an elevation of 52 m (171 ft) and prominence of 47 m (154 ft).
