= Fisher Hill (Antigua) =

Mountain in Antigua and Barbuda

- Location within Antigua and Barbuda

Highest point
- Elevation: 231 m (758 ft)
- Prominence: 60 m (200 ft)
- Coordinates: 17°00′54.80″N 61°49′18.11″W

Geography
- Location: Antigua and Barbuda
- Parent range: Shekerley Mountains

Fisher Hill is one of the Shekerley Mountains of Saint Mary, Antigua and Barbuda. It has an elevation of 231 m (758 ft) and 60 m (197 ft) of prominence. It overlooks Rendezvous Bay.
