= Bermudian Valley =

- Ghost town
- Location within Antigua
- Coordinates: 17°02′38″N 61°53′07″W
- Country: Antigua and Barbuda
- Parish: Saint Mary
- Division: Bermudian Valley

Bermudian Valley is a ghost town in Saint Mary, Antigua and Barbuda. Bermudian Valley was granted town status in 1675, the designation establishing the settlement as one of six official places of trade. Bermudian Valley was the headtown of the eponymous Bermudian Valley Division, which continued to be an administrative entity after the town's depopulation. Bermudian Valley was abadoned in 1842, around the same time as Bridgetown. The present-day village of Ffryes is located where the town once stood, and the valley itself is now known as the Orange Valley.
