= Christian Valley =

Official historic site of Antigua and Barbuda

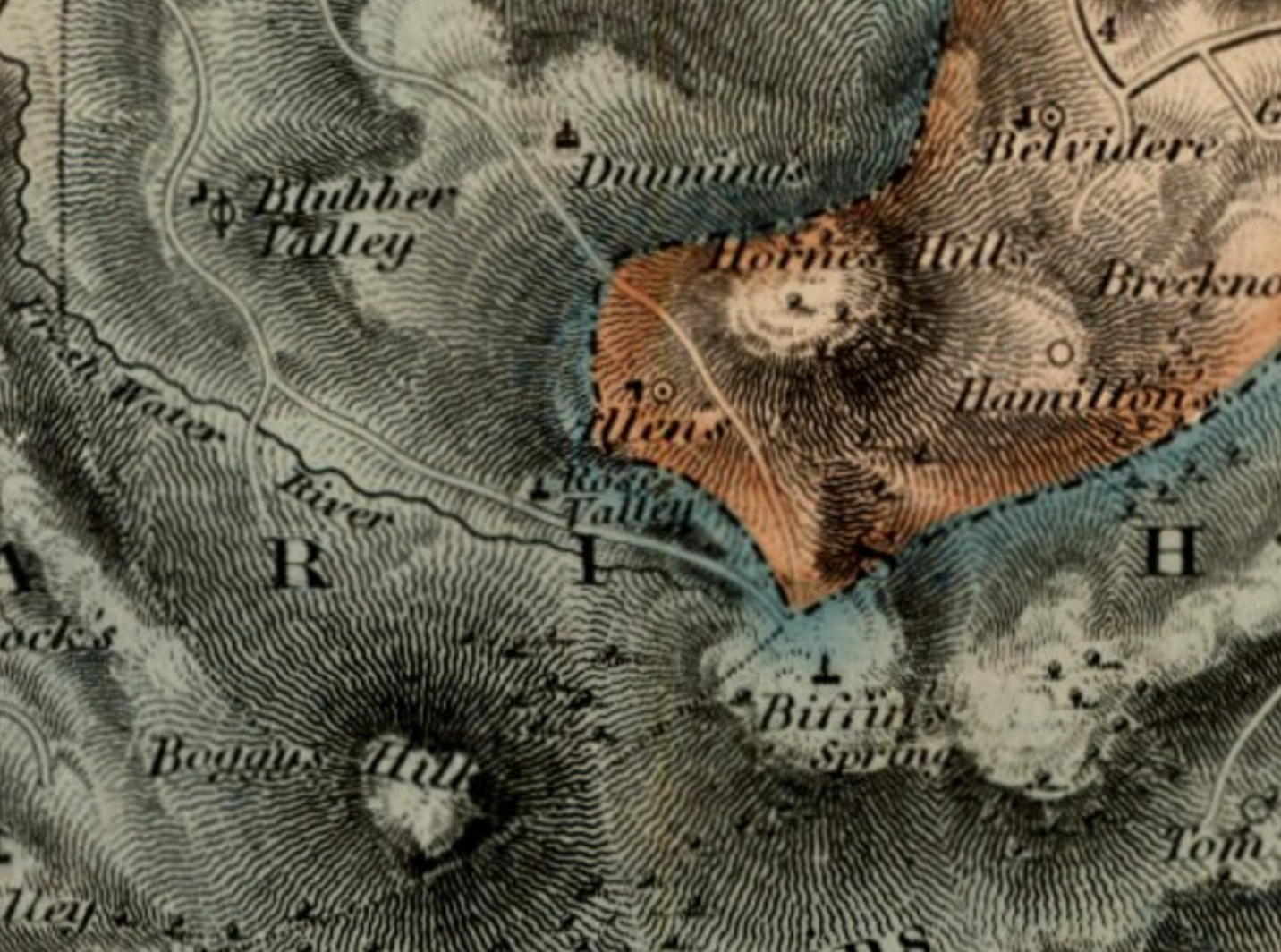
- An 1829 map referring to the area as "Rose Valley"

- Location within Antigua and Barbuda
- 17°03′13.7″N 61°51′03.3″W
- Location: Saint Mary, Antigua and Barbuda

History
- Built: 1777

Historical Site of Antigua and Barbuda

Christian Valley, formerly known as Roses Valley, is a valley and forest reserve in the Shekerley Mountains of Saint Mary, Antigua and Barbuda. The valley was home to a slave estate, sometimes referred to as Biffins and a former creek known as the Fresh Water River. Some communities of escaped slaves also inhabited the surrounding hills and built trails that are still used today. The slave estate was established in 1777, named after Biffin's Spring, the river's source. This spring is today known as the Christian Valley Waterfall. In 1779 the estate was owned by Mathew Christian, its namesake. Following the abolition of slavery in 1833, the estate's owners were granted 2,746 pounds for the 198 enslaved persons at the estate.

Today the valley is known for its scenic views of the mountains, and the Christian Valley Agricultural Station, a government operated station home to a large portion of the island's mature fruit trees. The valley contains many of the rare bird species of the Leeward Islands and is considered a Key Biodiversity Area. The valley is state owned and its water flows into a nearby bay, similar in geography to the former Fresh Water River. Proposed 1990s legislation to protect the valley from deforestation has not yet been enacted.
