= Jennings, Antigua and Barbuda =

Jennings
- Village
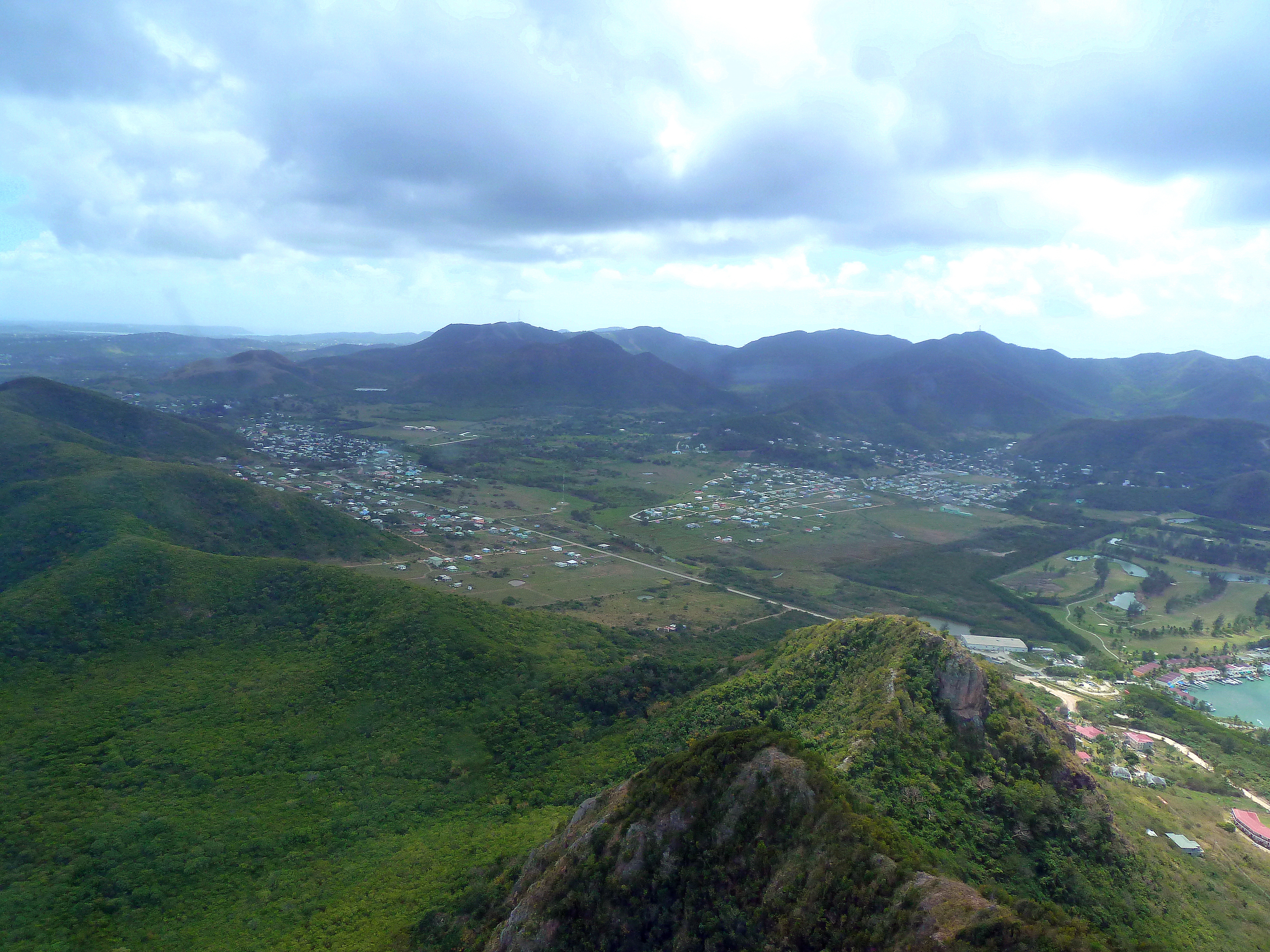
- A view of Bolans and Jennings
- Interactive map of the Jennings main place
- Location within Antigua and Barbuda
- Coordinates: 17°4′38.82″N 61°52′4.04″W
- Country: Antigua and Barbuda
- Island: Antigua
- Civil parish: Saint Mary Parish
- Time zone: UTC-4 (AST)

Jennings is a small settlement in the parish of Saint Mary on the island of Antigua, in Antigua and Barbuda. It is located in the west of the island. The village is on the road between St. John's and of Bolans, and some three kilometres from Five Island Harbour on the west coast.
