= Emanuel, Antigua and Barbuda =

Emmanuel
- Village
- The village in 2026
- Interactive map of the Emanuel main place
- Location within Antigua and Barbuda
- Coordinates: 17°4′20.42″N 61°50′24.54″W
- Country: Antigua and Barbuda
- Island: Antigua
- Civil parish: Saint John Parish

Government
  - Type: Village Council (possibly dissolved)

Population (2011)
  - Total: 398
- Time zone: UTC-4 (AST)

Emmanuel is a village in Saint John Parish, Antigua and Barbuda. Some residents consider it to be a neighbourhood of Bendals.

== Demographics ==
Emmanuel has two enumeration districts.

- 34201 Emmanuel_1
- 34202 Emmanuel_2

=== Census data (2011) ===
==== Individual ====
Q48 Ethnic	Counts	%
African descendent	375	94.44%
East Indian/India	7	1.67%
Mixed (Black/White)	1	0.28%
Hispanic	10	2.50%
Don't know/Not stated	4	1.11%
Total	398	100.00%

Q49 Religion	Counts	%
Adventist	61	15.36%
Anglican	92	23.18%
Baptist	19	4.75%
Church of God	51	12.85%
Methodist	12	3.07%
Moravian	17	4.19%
Nazarene	1	0.28%
None/no religion	29	7.26%
Pentecostal	40	10.06%
Rastafarian	19	4.75%
Roman Catholic	21	5.31%
Weslyan Holiness	1	0.28%
Other	29	7.26%
Don't know/Not stated	6	1.40%
Total	395	100.00%
NotApp :	2	

Q55 Internet Use	Counts	%
Yes	134	33.61%
No	259	65.28%
Don't know/Not stated	4	1.11%
Total	398	100.00%

Q61 Lived Overseas	Counts	%
Yes	20	6.79%
No	273	93.21%
Total	293	100.00%
NotApp :	105	

Q71 Country of Citizenship 1	Counts	%
Antigua and Barbuda	343	86.39%
Other Asian and Middle Eastern countries	1	0.28%
Dominica	9	2.22%
Dominican Republic	3	0.83%
Guyana	15	3.89%
Jamaica	14	3.61%
St. Lucia	1	0.28%
St. Vincent and the Grenadines	2	0.56%
United Kingdom	1	0.28%
USA	3	0.83%
Not Stated	3	0.83%
Total	398	100.00%

Q58. Country of birth	Counts	%
Other Latin or North American countries	1	0.28%
Antigua and Barbuda	293	73.61%
Dominica	21	5.28%
Dominican Republic	6	1.39%
Guyana	22	5.56%
Jamaica	27	6.67%
Monsterrat	2	0.56%
St. Lucia	2	0.56%
St. Vincent and the Grenadines	8	1.94%
United Kingdom	2	0.56%
USA	9	2.22%
USVI United States Virgin Islands	1	0.28%
Not Stated	4	1.11%
Total	398	100.00%

Q71 Country of Citizenship 2 (Country of Second/Dual Citizenship)	Counts	%
Dominica	14	26.00%
Dominican Republic	3	6.00%
Guyana	6	10.00%
Jamaica	13	24.00%
Monsterrat	3	6.00%
St. Lucia	1	2.00%
St. Vincent and the Grenadines	4	8.00%
United Kingdom	1	2.00%
USA	7	12.00%
Other countries	2	4.00%
Total	55	100.00%
NotApp :	342	

==== Household ====
There are 145 households in Emmanuel.

Q3 Main roofing material	Counts	%
Concrete	4	2.76%
Sheet metal	125	86.21%
Shingle (asphalt)	13	8.97%
Shingle (Other)	1	0.69%
Other (inc. improvised, tarpaulin, tile)	2	1.38%
Total	145	100.00%

Q2 Main Material of outer walls	Counts	%
Concrete	14	9.66%
Concrete/ Blocks	18	12.41%
Wood	91	62.76%
Wood and concrete	22	15.17%
Total	145	100.00%

Q5 Type of dwelling	Counts	%
Separate house	137	94.48%
Double house/duplex	7	4.83%
Do not know/Not stated	1	0.69%
Total	145	100.00%

Q7 Land tenure	Counts	%
Leasehold	6	4.14%
Owned/Freehold	67	46.21%
Rented	17	11.72%
Rented free	27	18.62%
Other (inc. permission to work land, sharecropping, squatted)	12	8.28%
Don't know/not stated	16	11.03%
Total	145	100.00%

Q6 Type of ownership	Counts	%
Owned with mortgage	9	6.21%
Owned outright	97	66.90%
Rent free	2	1.38%
Rented Private	26	17.93%
Other (inc. leased, rented Gov., squatted)	2	1.38%
Do not know/Not stated	9	6.21%
Total	145	100.00%

Q11 Garbage disposal	Counts	%
Garbage truck Private	2	1.38%
Garbage truck Public	143	98.62%
Total	145	100.00%

Q4 Year built	Counts	%
Before 1980	12	8.28%
1980–1989	22	15.17%
1990–1999	37	25.52%
2000–2006	17	11.72%
Year 2007	1	0.69%
Year 2008	10	6.90%
Year 2009	5	3.45%
Year 2010	2	1.38%
Don't Know/not stated	39	26.90%
Total	145	100.00%

Q12 Main source of water	Counts	%
Private, piped into dwelling	2	1.38%
Public standpipe	21	14.48%
Public piped into dwelling	91	62.76%
Public piped into dwelling	2	1.38%
Cistern/tank	28	19.31%
Other (inc. private not into dwelling, well/tank, spring/river)	1	0.69%
Total	145	100.00%

Q23 3b Laptop Computer	Counts	%
Yes	33	22.76%
No	112	77.24%
Total	145	100.00%

Q24 Motor Vehicles	Counts	%
0	72	53.73%
1	45	33.58%
2	15	11.19%
3	2	1.49%
Total	134	100.00%
Missing :	11	

Q23 9 Mobile Device	Counts	%
Yes	124	85.52%
No	21	14.48%
Total	145	100.00%

Q23 3a Desktop Computer	Counts	%
Yes	27	18.62%
No	118	81.38%
Total	145	100.00%

Q23 10 Radio	Counts	%
Yes	115	79.31%
No	30	20.69%
Total	145	100.00%

Q25 4 Internet access	Counts	%
No	65	44.83%
Yes	26	17.93%
Don't know/not declared	54	37.24%
Total	145	100.00%

Q27 Crime Reported	Counts	%
No	1	20.00%
Don't know/Not stated	4	80.00%
Total	5	100.00%
NotApp :	140	
