= Boggy Peak =

Highest point of Antigua

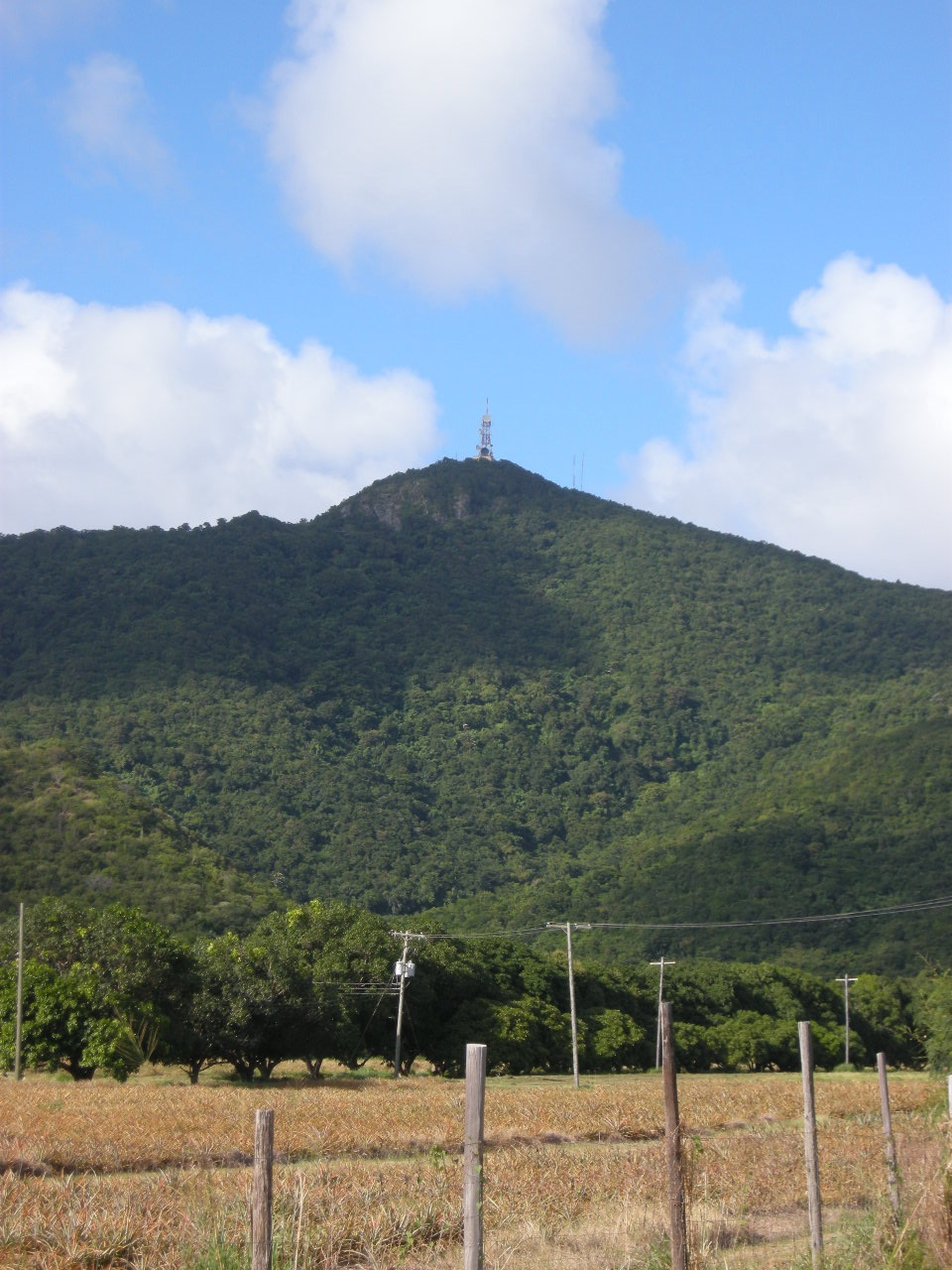

Highest point
- Elevation: 402 m (1,319 ft)
- Prominence: 402 m (1,319 ft)
- Listing: Antigua's highest point
- Coordinates: 17°02′41″N 61°51′40″W

Geography
- Location within Antigua and Barbuda
- Location: Antigua and Barbuda
- Parent range: Shekerley Mountains

Boggy Peak (/boʊɡi/) is a mountain located in the southwest of Antigua, a constituent island of the archipelagic country of Antigua and Barbuda. At a height of 1,319 feet (402 m), it is the highest point of the Shekerley Mountains and the island as a whole.

In 2009, Boggy Peak was renamed Mount Obama by then prime minister of Antigua and Barbuda Baldwin Spencer, in honour of then US president Barack Obama. The name change was criticised by the parliamentary opposition at the time and reverted in 2016 by the government that succeeded Spencer's.

== Geography ==
Boggy Peak lies in the southwest corner of Antigua and is a part of the Shekerley Mountains. It rises to a height of 1,319 feet (402 m), making it the highest point of the Shekerley Mountains and the highest point on Antigua.

== History ==
Boggy Peak was historically the location of sugarcane plantations toiled by plantation slaves. The name Boggy Peak originated from slave masters who told stories about the dangers of the bogeyman (local spelling boggy man) who lived on the mountain. This was done to discourage slaves from escaping and running away (like the Antiguan Maroons).

On 5 November 2008, then prime minister of Antigua and Barbuda Baldwin Spencer sent a congratulatory letter to then US president-elect Barack Obama, in which he expressed his intention to change the name of Boggy Peak to Mount Obama. Political analyst Avel Grant commented that the move could attract tourism to the island. The name change was made official on 4 August 2009 and criticised by members of the opposition Labour Party, who called the decision "silly". The original name was restored by decision of the Cabinet of Antigua and Barbuda in 2016.

== See also ==
- Geography of Antigua and Barbuda
