= Falmouth Harbour =

Natural harbour on the southern coast of Antigua

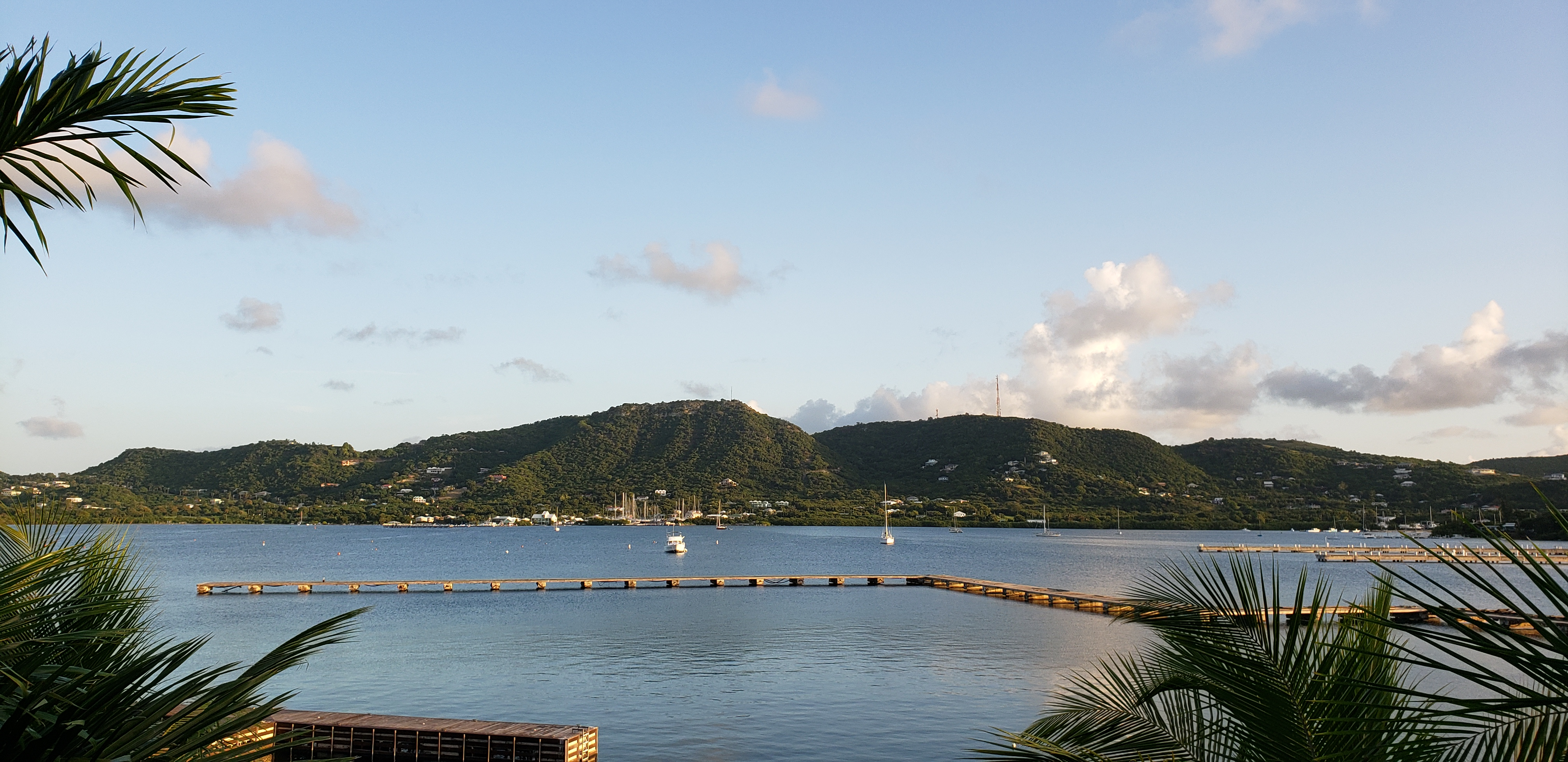
Falmouth Harbour, Antigua

Location of Falmouth Harbour on Antigua island, within Antigua and Barbuda

Falmouth Harbour is a horseshoe-shaped bay and natural harbour on the far southern coast of the island of Antigua in Antigua and Barbuda.

The town of Falmouth in Saint Paul is located on it.

== Geography ==
The small township and port of Falmouth lies close to its northern shore. English Harbour is located close to its eastern shore. Its geographic coordinates are 17°1′0″N 61°46′0″W.

The harbour lies close to the eastern end of the Shekerley Mountains, a range of hills along Antigua's southern coast. Monk's Hill, the easternmost peak in the range, lies immediately to the north of the bay.

== See also ==
- Category:Antigua
