= Five Island Harbour =

Coordinates: 17°06′N 61°54′W

Location of Five Island Harbour on Antigua island, in Antigua and Barbuda

Five Island Harbour is a large bay on the west coast of the island of Antigua, in Antigua and Barbuda.

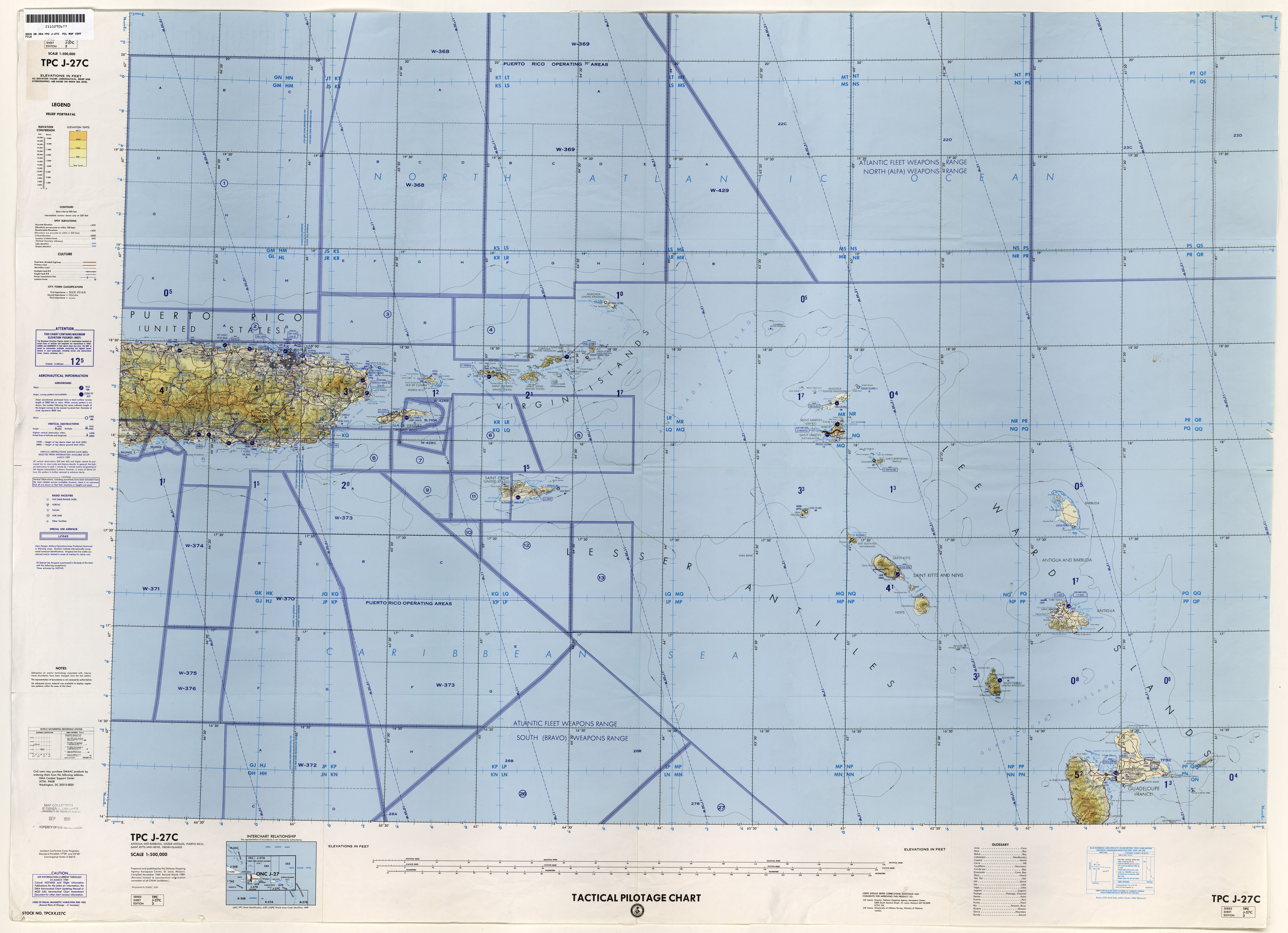
Map of the region including Five Island Harbour (DMA, 1989)

It is located 5 kilometres (3.1 mi) southwest of the nation's capital city of St. John's.

The town of Five Islands is on a peninsula along its northern shoreline. The Flashes are a mangrove and scrubland area where Cooks Creek meets the bay.

== See also ==
- Category:Antigua
