= Shekerley Mountains =

Mountains in Antigua and Barbuda

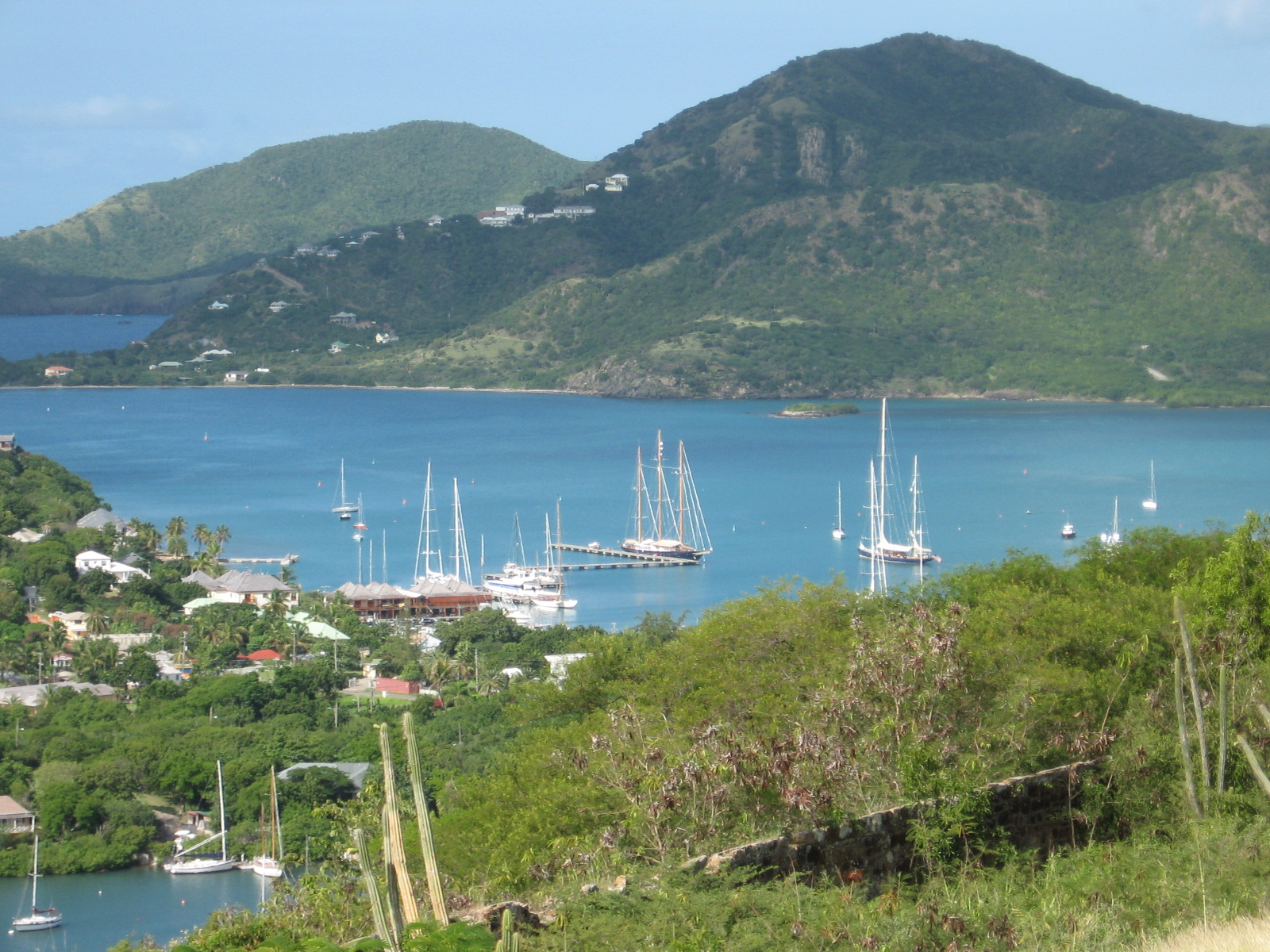
- The eastern Shekerley Mountains and Falmouth Harbour

Highest point
- Peak: Boggy Peak
- Elevation: 402 m (1,319 ft)
- Coordinates: 17°2′36.17″N 61°50′50.93″W

Geography
- Location within Antigua and Barbuda
- Location: Antigua and Barbuda
- Region: Caribbean

The Shekerley Mountains are a low mountain range in southwestern Antigua. The range contains all of the highest peaks in Antigua and Barbuda. There are several peaks that are higher than 100 metres (about 300 feet), including Boggy Peak, the tallest. The mountains are the centre of a cultural region known as Round South, and they extend across three parishes– Saint John, Saint Mary, and Saint Paul. The mountains are sparsely populated, with about one-thousand people living in the chain's various communities, most notably in John Hughes.

The mountains contain many valleys, including Christian Valley, Orange Valley, and Dark Valley. Historically, many of the island's sugar estates were located in the mountains, although few Antiguan Maroon communities formed due to legends of a "boggy man", this being the origin of the name "Boggy Peak". While the origin of the name Shekerley is unknown, it is probably based on a proper name in common with much of the island's other geographic names. It used to be referred to in the possessive form "Shekerley's Mountains" on many maps from the island's early colonisation.

The mountains are located in the volcanic region of Antigua. The range stretches for 15 kilometres (9.3 mi) along the south coast of the island, from Johnsons Point in the west, to Falmouth Harbour in the east. The chain is a proposed conservation site, with some minor areas including the Wallings Forest being an Important Bird Area and national park. The Shekerley Mountains coincide with the Antiguan portion of the Leeward Islands moist forests, and this is the only part of the country with a tropical monsoon climate.

== Geography ==
The range stretches for 15 kilometres (9.3 mi) along the south coast of the island, from near Johnsons Point in the west, to Falmouth Harbour and Falmouth, near English Harbour in the east.

=== Prominent hills ===
All of the highest points on Antigua island are in the Shekerley Mountains range.

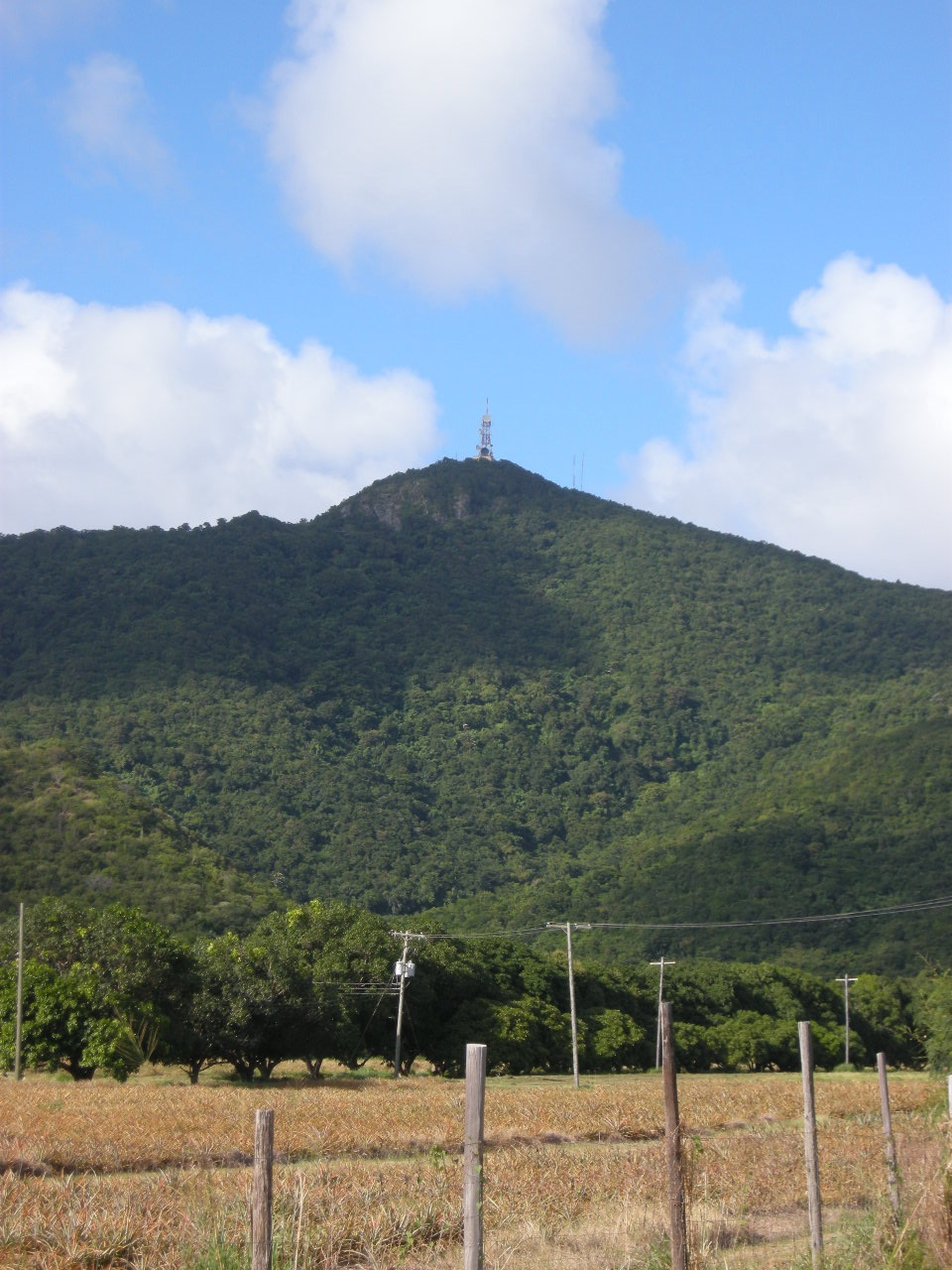
Boggy Peak in the Shekerley Mountains.

The most prominent hills of the Shekerley Mountains include:

- Boggy Peak, the highest and formerly named Mount Obama
- Monks Hill
- Signal Hill
- Sage Hill
- Green Castle Hill
- Bolans Hill
- McNish Mountain
- Cades Peak
- Botts Peak
- Spring Hill
- Cherry Hill
- Fisher Hill
- Winter Hill
- Mount Carmel
- Garden Hill

== Human activity ==
The Shekerley Mountains are the centre of the Round South cultural region. Communities in and near the mountains speak South Antiguan. The primary human settlements in the area are John Hughes and Ffryes. The valleys of the mountains used to support more settlements, including the now-abandoned Bermudian Valley town, Hamiltons and Roses Village. The sugar estates that dotted the chain also had populations of about a few dozen each.

The mountains are nearly encircled by Antigua's road network, including Valley Road, the primary throughfare in Saint Mary, Old Road, and Fig Tree Drive, which cuts directly through the eastern portion of the chain through John Hughes. Ecotourism and agriculture continue to be the area's dominant industries. There are several officially protected forests in the range, including Wallings near John Hughes.

Demographically, the villages in the area have lower immigration than the national average and are mostly made up of African desendants. Most people in the region are Protestant Christians. These villages sometimes received immigrants in the 19th and 20th centuries at the economic peak of the region. The mountains also were encircled by the old rail network. While the area once had light industry and many farms, the area is now one of the most deprived in the country and many people commute into Bolans and into the Central Plain.

== See also ==
- Landforms of Antigua and Barbuda
- Mountain ranges of the Caribbean
