= List of pre-Columbian sites in Antigua and Barbuda =

Indigenous and archaeological sites in Antigua and Barbuda

Pre-Columbian Antigua and Barbuda was home to hundreds of villages and several hundred other places of human activity between the arrival of the Archaic culture around 3700 BC and the European colonization of the islands starting in the late 17th century. These sites were distributed throughout the modern-day country, most densely along the coasts.

== List ==
This is a partial list of pre-Columbian sites in the country:

Site	Island	Coordinates
Boiling Rocks	Barbuda	17°33′10.07″N 61°44′35.86″W
Cades Bay	Antigua	17°01′36.95″N 61°51′46.35″W
Doigs	Antigua	17°01′02.21″N 61°48′38.62″W
Elliot's	Antigua	17°04′09.89″N 61°43′53.03″W
Green Castle Hill	Antigua	17°4′24.73″N 61°51′1.60″W
Guava	Barbuda	17°36′55.66″N 61°49′03.44″W
Highland Road	Barbuda	17°39′59.00″N 61°47′39.54″W
Indian Creek	Antigua	17°00′34.76″N 61°44′40.77″W
Indian Town Trail	Barbuda	17°40′26.80″N 61°46′30.15″W
Jolly Beach	Antigua	17°04′03.79″N 61°53′20.27″W
Little Deep	Antigua	17°03′31.35″N 61°40′43.08″W
Long Island	Antigua	17°09′18″N 61°45′12″W
Mamora Bay	Antigua	17°00′59.35″N 61°44′19.50″W
Mill Reef	Antigua	17°03′24.15″N 61°40′40.80″W
Muddy Bay	Antigua	17°04′47.41″N 61°42′17.74″W
Royall's	Antigua	17°09′48.72″N 61°48′51.75″W
Seaview	Barbuda	17°40′44.38″N 61°46′46.93″W
Sufferers	Barbuda	17°33′23.76″N 61°44′27.43″W
The River	Barbuda	17°35′30.6″N 61°49′10.9″W
Twenty Hill	Antigua	17°6′8″N 61°46′11″W
Welches	Barbuda	17°34′39.63″N 61°44′29.15″W
Winthrope's Bay	Antigua	17°08′44.37″N 61°47′04.00″W
