= Old Road Division =

Division of Antigua

Old Road
- Division
- Coordinates: 17°01′N 61°50′W
- Country: Antigua and Barbuda
- Parish: Saint Mary

Old Road is a division of Saint Mary, Antigua and Barbuda. It contains the parish's headtown Old Road and other villages along Antigua's southwest coast including parts of Crabs Hill, and all of Johnsons Point and Urlings. It is bounded to the north by the Shekerley Mountains. Major roads in the area include Valley Road, Old Road, and Fig Tree Drive.
