= Mamora Bay (Indigenous site) =

Archaelogical site in Antigua

- location in Antigua and Barbuda
- 17°00′59.35″N 61°44′19.50″W
- Location: near English Harbour, Saint Paul, Antigua and Barbuda
- Region: Antigua and Barbuda

Mamora Bay is a Ceramic and post-Saladoid site in Saint Paul, Antigua and Barbuda. It is about 3 kilometres from the nearest major town, English Harbour. This site was a village likely inhabited between 900 and 1200 AD. The material culture at this site is similar to that of nearby Indian Creek and Coconut Hall.
