= Doigs (Indigenous site) =

Archaelogical site in Antigua

- location in Antigua and Barbuda
- 17°01′02.21″N 61°48′38.62″W
- Location: near Old Road, Saint Mary, Antigua and Barbuda
- Region: Antigua and Barbuda

Doigs is a Ceramic period site in Saint Mary, Antigua and Barbuda. It is about 4 kilometres from the nearest major town, Old Road. The site is near Ding-a-Dong-Nook, the site of a conflict between indigenous people and early British settlers that resulted in the deaths of much of a governor's family. There was activity at the site around 250 AD. Shell tools, beads, and ceramics have been found at the site.
