= Coconut Hall (Indigenous site) =

Archaelogical site in Antigua

- location in Antigua and Barbuda
- 17°06′38.42″N 61°43′45.62″W
- Location: near Parham, Saint Peter, Antigua and Barbuda
- Region: Antigua and Barbuda

Coconut Hall is a post-Saladoid site in Saint Peter, Antigua and Barbuda. It is about 3.5 kilometres from the nearest major village, Parham. Radiocarbon analysis suggests that the site was inhabited between 900 AD and 1200 AD. Artifacts at the site resemble those found at Muddy Bay, Blackman's, and Mamora Bay.
