= List of museums in Antigua and Barbuda =

This is a list of museums in Antigua and Barbuda.

- Museum of Antigua & Barbuda
- Dockyard Museum
- Betty's Hope Museum

== See also ==
- List of museums by country
