= Royall's (Indigenous site) =

Archaelogical site in Antigua

- location in Antigua and Barbuda
- 17°09′48.72″N 61°48′51.75″W
- Location: near Hodges Bay, Saint John, Antigua and Barbuda
- Region: Antigua and Barbuda

Royall's is a Ceramic period site in Saint John, Antigua and Barbuda. It is located in Hodges Bay and was likely inhabited between 250 AD and 650 AD. It was likely located on a now dried-up creek and various ceramic creations including vessels and masks have been found at the site.
