= Indian Town Trail =

Archaelogical site in Barbuda

- location in Antigua and Barbuda
- 17°40′26.80″N 61°46′30.15″W
- Location: Two Foot Bay, Barbuda Antigua and Barbuda
- Region: Antigua and Barbuda

Indian Town Trail is a post-Saladoid site in Barbuda, near Seaview. It is about 6.6 kilometres from the nearest major village, Codrington. Deposits of charcoal used for cooking have been found at the site. Road constrction in the area revealed two burials. The diet of the villagers was mostly based on fish and other seafood. The site was inhabited for a lengthy continuous period between the first millennium BC to the middle part of the second millennium AD.
