= Crabbs Hill =

Village in Antigua

- Village
- Interactive map of the Crabbs Hill main place
- Location within Antigua and Barbuda
- Coordinates: 17°02′04″N 61°53′28″W
- Country: Antigua and Barbuda
- Island: Antigua
- Civil parish: Saint Mary Parish

Government
  - Type: Village Council (possibly dissolved)
  - MP: Dwayne George

Area
  - Land: 0.57 km^{2} (0.22 sq mi)

Population (2011)
  - Total: 142
  - Density: 250/km^{2} (650/sq mi)
- Time zone: UTC-4 (AST)

Crabbs Hill (Note: Alternatively rendered in modern and historical sources as Crabbes Hill, Crabs Hill, Crabb Hill, Crab Hill, or Crabbe Hill.) is a village in Saint Mary, Antigua and Barbuda. Crabbs Hill had a population of 142 people over 0.57 square kilometres. The village is surrounded by the forests of the Shekerley Mountains and is located on Antigua's southwest coast, with Montserrat being visible from its two beaches: Crabbs Hill beach and Turner's. Crabbs Hill emerged after the emancipation of slaves in Antigua and today is one of the smallest standalone villages on the island. The village is located on Valley Road between Ffryes and Johnsons Point.

== Geography ==
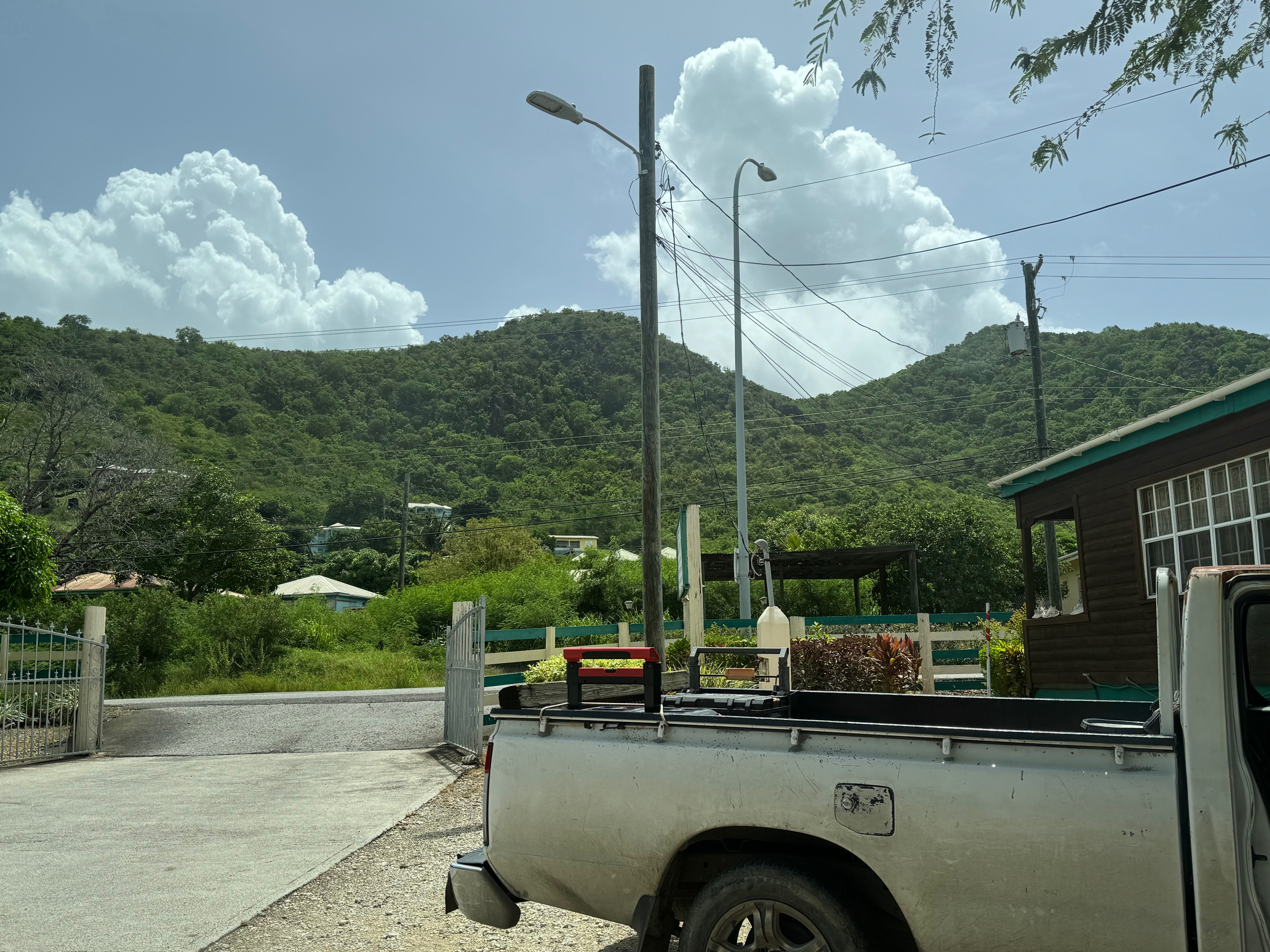
View of the village's homes

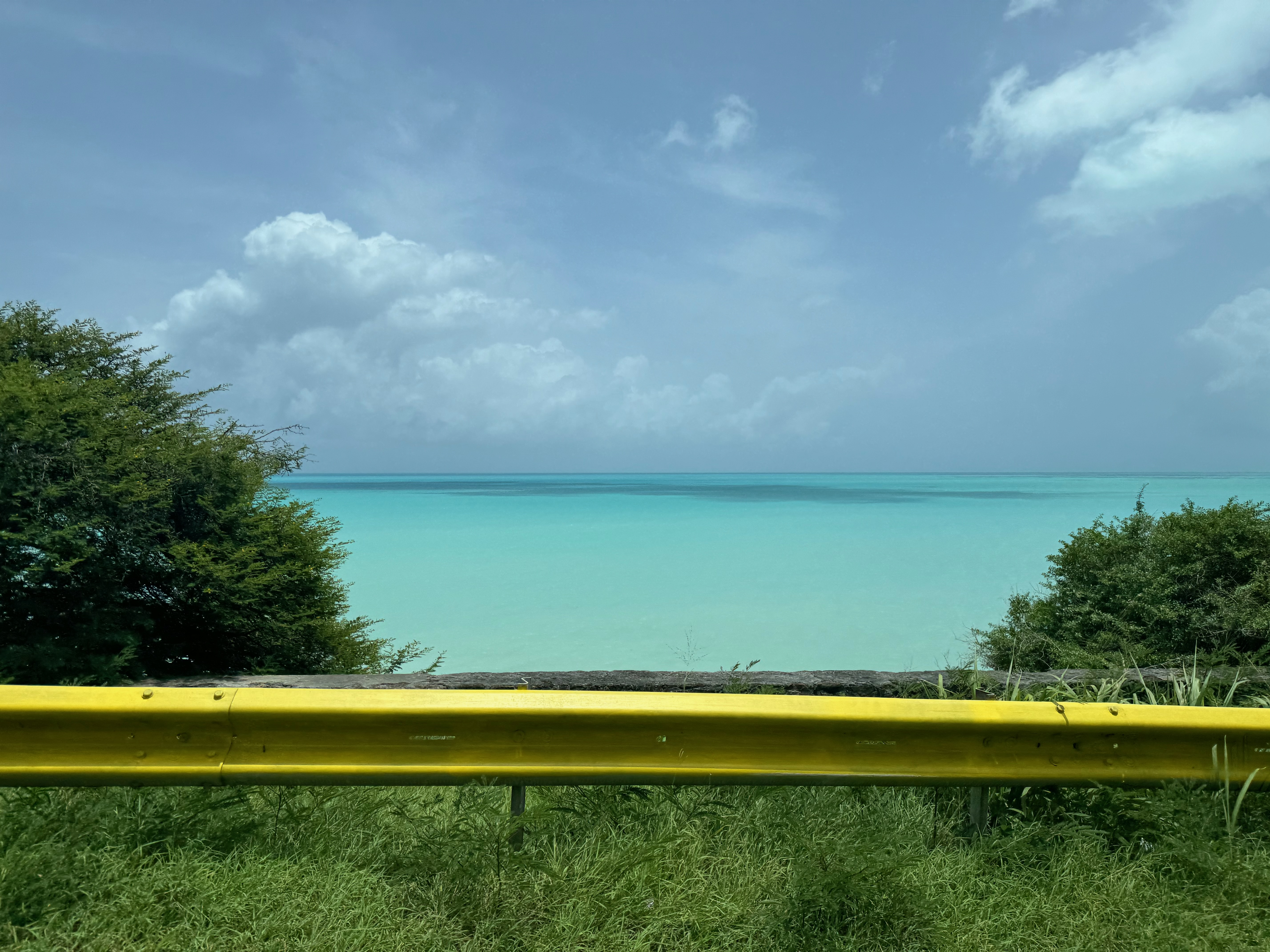
View of the Caribbean Sea in the northern part of the village

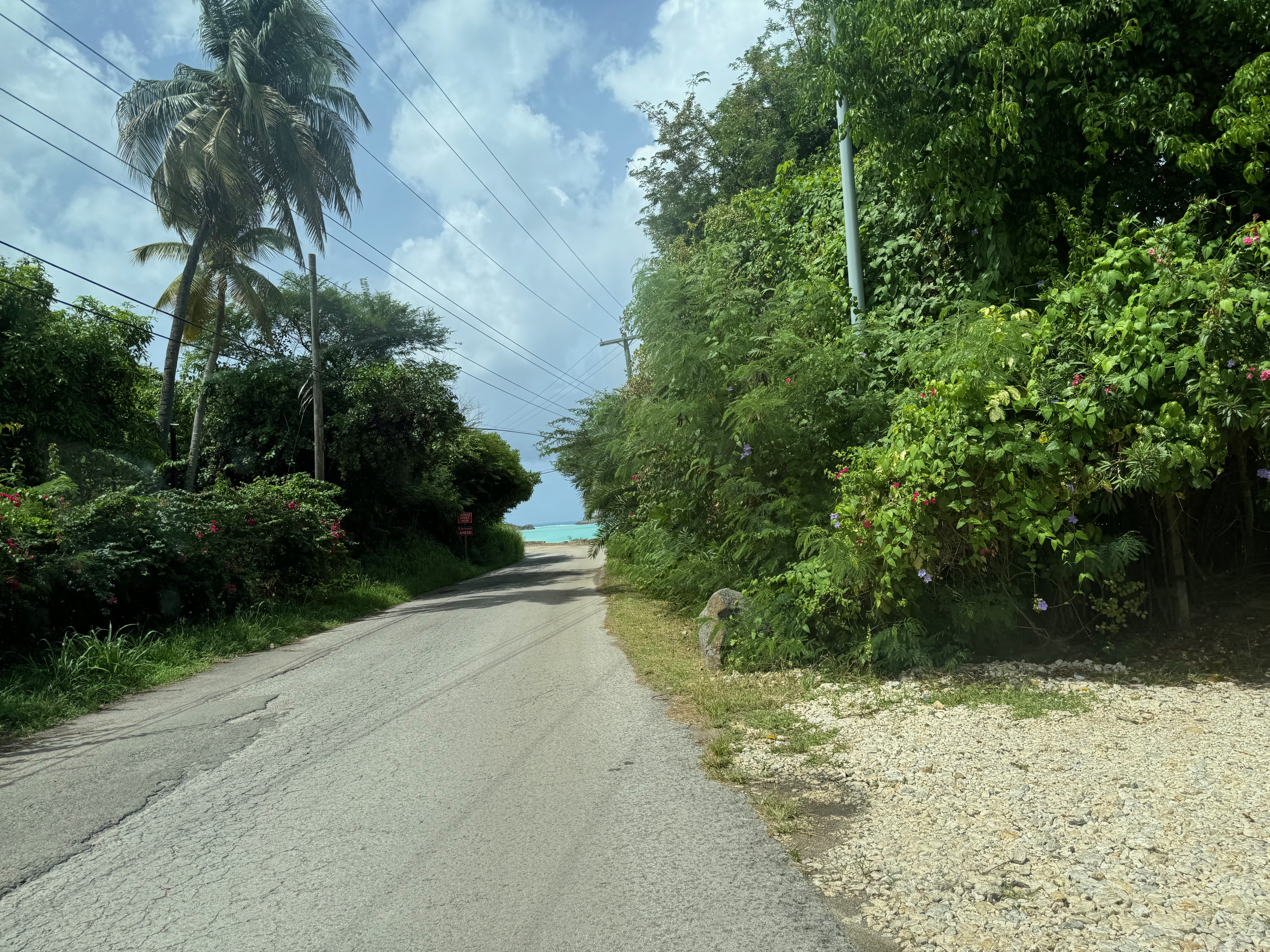
A road in the village

According to the National Bureau of Statistics, Crabbs Hill has a land area of 0.57 square kilometres in one enumeration district. Crabbs Hill is located at the foothills of the Shekerley Mountains on the coast of Picarts Bay, where the tropical forests of the mountains meet the sea. The eastern, inland portion of the village is primarily covered by the Leeward Islands moist forests, which encircle the main area of rural settlement in the western area directly along the coast. On the coasts there are also some very small portions of mangrove wetlands. The entire coastline is covered by land used for recreational purposes, namely Turner's Beach and Crab Hill Beach, with Turner's also slightly extending into neighbouring Johnson's Point. There are a few small ponds and other water bodies in the village, the largest of which is located at (17°01′44.27″N 61°53′20.46″W).

Crabbs Hill is located in Antigua's volcanic formation. Most of the village is deemed to have high or highest risk during landslides. The village is at moderate risk for drought. The most densely settled portion of the village has an elevation of about 19 metres.

Crabbs Hill is located about 0.9 kilometres northwest of Johnson's Point, 1.8 kilometres northwest of Urlings, 2.2 kilometres southwest of Ffryes, 3.7 kilometres southwest of Bolans and Jolly Harbour, and 5.2 kilometres northwest of Old Road. Crabbs Hill borders the Boggy Peak locality to the northeast, Johnson's Point to the southeast, and the Caribbean Sea between Antigua and Montserrat to the west. Montserrat is easily visible from the village's beaches. The primary thoroughfare in the village is Valley Road, an official highway that connects St. John's to Urlings via Jennings and Bolans.

== History ==
Crabbs Hill is not known to have had any sugar estates within its boundaries. An 1829 map shows a hill labeled "Crab Hill" but no settlement is shown here. However, the 1856 census mentions the village as having a population of 133 (60 men and 73 women in 23 homes), thus, it can be concluded that Crabbs Hill was one of the villages that emerged following emancipation.

On 23 August 1888, an anonymous villager wrote to the Antigua Observer about the situation in Crabbs Hill. The resident stated that a tree was blocking the main roadway in the village and that it was a severe hazard to the village's residents. A letter to the Antigua Standard from 6 March 1889 also repeated these complaints, stating that even if the governor decided to come to the village to check on the situation, his horse would likely fall off the cliff into the sea given the severity of the road's decay. The resident said that a rotting wooden railing installed by the government on the side of the road was ineffective and that a wall should be placed there instead. An October 1890 report on the conditions of the roads stated that the road in Crabbs Hill was by far the most dangerous road in the area, and that while it was not particularly steep, it was only twelve feet wide and that the dry wall and wooden fence used to keep travellers from falling into the sea was often destroyed by the heavy rains. It proposed detonating explosives to give the road more space and building a larger causeway near the pond adjacent to Darkwood Beach to allow for easier travel.

In 1893 Crabbs Hill was one of several villages on the island affected by a disease killing off much of the island's pigs. On 12 April 1894 the Observer reported that the Leeward Islands government was working on improving the poor water situation in the village. It was mentioned that the government had once attempted to build a reservoir in Crabbs Hill but this proved a failure. It was stated that while there was a natural spring in the village that residents used to get drinking water, attempts to deepen it resulted in the water being too salty. In December 1897 the representative for the Valley district brought attention to the state of the Crabbs Hill road during a sitting of the legislative council.

On 19 September 1911, eleven people were fined or imprisoned due to noisy and disorderly conduct in the village. For Carnival celebrations in August 1914 a motorcade passed through the village, with an article stating that "[t]he owners of motor cars for hire ought to do a busy trade on that day". A 1915 article notes that residents of Crabbs Hill and surrounding villages had trouble dealing with the long distance between them and their assigned magistrates' court in St. John's.

On 4 December 1950, John Sebastian was mentioned as being the chairperson of the Crabbs Hill and Johnsons Point village council. When universal suffrage was introduced in the colony in the 1951 general election, Crabbs Hill was zoned into the Saint Mary electoral district, which overwhelmingly voted to support ATLU candidate Bradley Carrott over competitor Harold Wilson. In 1956 Carott was put on the council unopposed.

In 1991, Crabbs Hill had a population of 186. In 1999, Hurricane Jose severely impacted the village, being declared one of three "disaster areas" in Antigua by the government. 64 of the 81 houses in the village were either damaged or destroyed in the hurricane. In 2001 Crabbs Hill had a population of 174.

== Demographics ==
In 2011, Crabbs Hill had a population of 142 people in one enumeration district. Major ethnic groups in the village included African descendants (93.28%), whites (3.73%), and other mixed (2.99%). Most of the people in the village (61.94%) were Anglican, with significant populations of Pentecostalists (7.46%) and Baptists (6.72%). Most of the population (85.82%) were born in Antigua and Barbuda, with other major countries of birth including Canada (3.73%), Dominica (2.24%), and the United States (2.24%). A 2007 report found that the village had slightly higher living conditions than Johnsons Point and slightly lower living conditions than downtown English Harbour. As of 2008, the village is considered upper low income, with similar incomes to downtown English Harbour and central Villa.

In 2011, there were 48 households in Crabbs Hill. Most homes in the village were built with either concrete blocks (45.83%) or a combination of wood and concrete (25.00%). 91.67% of homes had sheet metal roofs. Of people born in Antigua and Barbuda, 15.65% had lived abroad at some point in their life.

== Features ==
Crabbs Hill can be accessed by Valley Road which connects it to St. John's via Jennings and the Bolans-Jolly Harbour area. Continuing on the road southbound, Johnson's Point, Urlings, Old Road, and Fig Tree Drive can also be accessed. The two main beaches in the village are Crabbs Hill Beach and Turner's Beach, with Turner's Beach being well known on the island for its clear waters and white sandy beaches. From both of the village's beaches, one can see a view of the entire island of Montserrat. The village goes right up to the shore, and there are several restaurants in the area including OJ's Beach Bar and Jacqui O's Beach House. Near Turner's Beach there is a restaurant named after it. There are also several hotels including Keyonna Beach in the village's boundaries.
