= Welches (Barbuda) =

Archaelogical site in Barbuda

- location in Antigua and Barbuda
- 17°34′39.63″N 61°44′29.15″W
- Location: Salt Lake, Barbuda, Antigua and Barbuda
- Region: Antigua and Barbuda

Welches is a Ceramic period site in Barbuda. It is about 11 kilometres from the nearest major village, Codrington. It was likely the site of a prehistoric village. Excavation has not yet commenced at this site.
