= Sufferers (Barbuda) =

Archaelogical site in Barbuda

- location in Antigua and Barbuda
- 17°33′23.76″N 61°44′27.43″W
- Location: Salt Lake, Barbuda, Antigua and Barbuda
- Region: Antigua and Barbuda

Sufferers is a Ceramic period site in Barbuda. It is about 12.1 kilometres from the nearest major village, Codrington. It was a village, likely inhabited between 550 AD and 900 AD. It is located on Gravenor Bay and was likely associated with prehistoric economic activity in the area.
