= Little Deep =

Archaelogical site in Antigua

- location in Antigua and Barbuda
- 17°03′31.35″N 61°40′43.08″W
- Location: near Freetown, Saint Philip, Antigua and Barbuda
- Region: Antigua and Barbuda

Little Deep is an Archaic period site in Saint Philip, Antigua and Barbuda. It is about 3.2 kilometres from the nearest major village, Freetown. It is located near the Mill Reef site and it is the oldest known archaeological site on Antigua, dating to c. 3106 BC.
