= Rail transport in Antigua and Barbuda =

The network in 1957

Antigua had a rail system from around 1903 to 1971. These railways were constructed to connect the various sugarcane plantations that dominated the island's economy. All six parishes of Antigua were connected by these lines and the primary junction was located in Gunthropes, home to the island's head sugar factory. The factory was opened in 1905 and reached out in five directions. The network was a 762 mm (30 inch) gauge system. There were many lines and branches on the system, including the Sugar Terminal in St. John's. Before steam locomotives were introduced to the island, it is likely that animal traction was used instead.

Antigua's transition to a tourism economy caused the network's demise. Following the 1971 election, the new government made it a priority to abandon sugar, and the Gunthropes factory was closed by 1973. The government converted five cars and the No. 5 "George" locomotive to be part of a tourist railway dubbed "The Sunshine Shu Shu", although this quickly failed and the equipment was abandoned. A total of 26 locomotives were used in the system, with 19 remaining and 5 being on island. Some of the tracks are still visible, although a significant portion of it has been stolen for scrap metal.

In 2011, a project between the Museum of Antigua and Barbuda, the Betty's Hope Trust, the government, and other stakeholders successfully restored four locomotives by 2015. These are on display at the museum. It was also proposed that some be displayed at Betty's Hope although this process has encountered delays. A 0.5 km-long working narrowgauge railway was also proposed. A request was also made to the operators of the St. Kitts Scenic Railway to return one of the locomotives to Antigua, although this request was declined.
