= Archaic period in Antigua and Barbuda =

Historical period in Antigua and Barbuda

The Archaic period in pre-Columbian Antigua and Barbuda began with the arrival of the Archaic people on canoes c. 3685 BC in Barbuda and c. 3100 BC in Antigua and ended between 250 BC and 100 BC after a period of coexistence with the Ceramic culture. Archaic sites dotted the entire coastline of Antigua, and much of Barbuda especially along the South Coast. The Archaic people were hunter-gatherers and did not live in permanent settlements– they instead lived in small bands. It is unclear where the Archaic people originated from. It is likely that they either arrived from South America and the Greater Antilles, or from the Yucatán Peninsula in Mexico. These people spoke an unknown language, although these people are very commonly, albeit incorrectly, known as the Siboney (or Ciboney).

The Archaic people are distinguished from other indigenous groups by their use of flint blades. Based on evidence from the Strombus Line, Archaic people in Barbuda likely used lithic materials transported from Antigua. Their technologies have a greater resemblance to those once used in the Greater Antilles compared to those used in the rest of the Lesser Antilles. Artifacts typical of this culture include blades, knives, pestals, and axes. Archaic people tended to live directly along the coast to access seafood. Major archaic sites on Antigua include Winthrope's Bay, Jolly Beach, and Twenty Hill, and major archaic sites on Barbuda include The River and Boiling Rocks.
