= Winthrope's Bay =

Archaelogical site in Antigua

- location in Antigua and Barbuda
- 17°08′44.37″N 61°47′04.00″W
- Location: near Coolidge, Saint George, Antigua and Barbuda
- Region: Antigua and Barbuda

Winthrope's Bay is an Archaic and post-Saladoid site in Saint George, Antigua and Barbuda. It is about 1.6 kilometres from the nearest major village, Coolidge. The site was primarily used for its strategic location near Long Island, which was used for flint resources as far away as Barbuda. It is one of the oldest sites on the island, with radiocarbon dating suggesting activity as late as 1,387 BC.
