= Dockyard Museum =

Museum in Antigua and Barbuda

Coordinates: 17.007987°N 61.765290°W

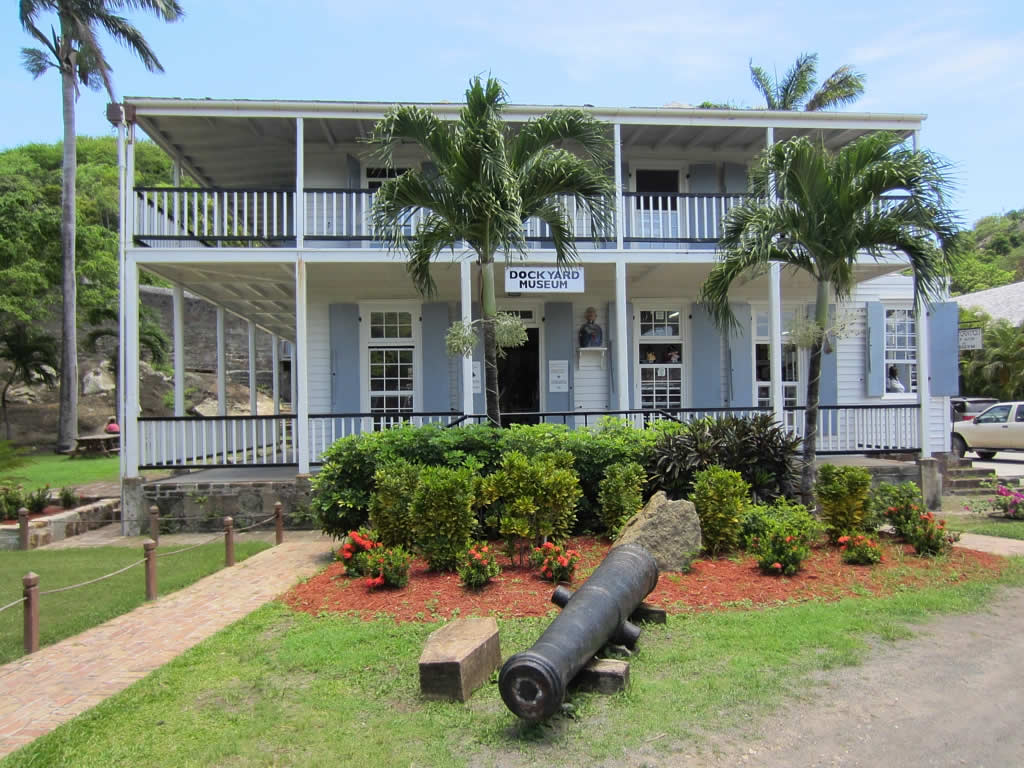
Dockyard Museum at Nelson's Dockyard on Antigua island.

The Dockyard Museum is a museum located at Nelson's Dockyard in English Harbour, Saint Paul Parish on Antigua island, in Antigua and Barbuda. The museum opened in 1997, however the dockyard itself dates fromm 1725, making it the only continuously operating Georgian dockyard in the world.

== History ==
The dockyard first came into use in 1725, when sugar traders in Antigua offered use of the harbour to the Royal Navy. However, the majority of buildings in the dock weren't constructed until the latter half of the 18th century. The original boathouse was constructed in 1797, but was damaged by both an earthquake and a hurricane in the 19th century, so only its stone pillars remain.

After this, a further boathouse was established in 1855, originally serving as the Officer's quarters. The Royal Navy abandoned the dockhouse in 1889, leaving it empty until restoration work began in 1955, with the support of Princess Margaret, who visited that year, and Lady Churchill. The refurbished building was opened in 1961.

The boathouse itself served as offices for the National Park service until 1997, at which point it opened as a museum.

In 2016, the dockyard area was inscribed as a UNESCO World Heritage Site.

The dockyard area celebrated its 300th anniversary in 2025.

== Collections ==
The museum highlights the history of the dockyard, which is the only continuously operating Georgian Era dockyard in the world. They hold a bed which Horatio Nelson is believed to have slept in. The museum also displays current historical and archaeological research from the island.

== See also ==
- Category:Antigua
- List of museums in Antigua and Barbuda
