= Sail Loft Pillars =

Official historic site of Antigua and Barbuda

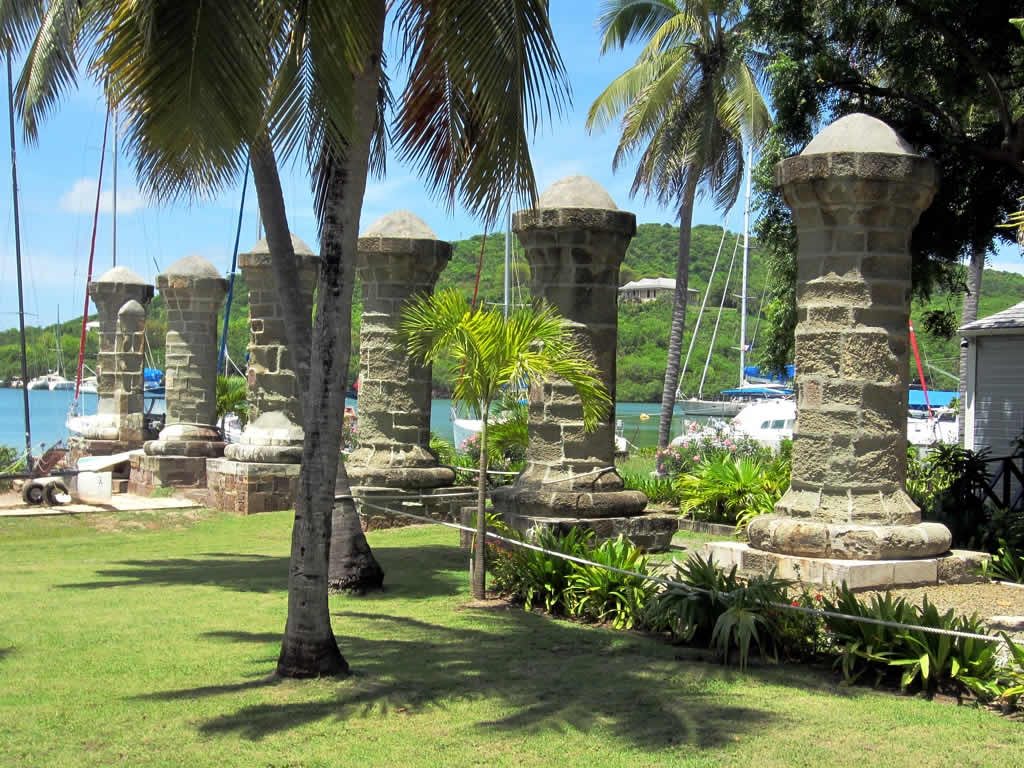
- The pillars in July 2011.

- Location within Antigua and Barbuda
- 17°00′30.94″N 61°45′57.18″W
- Location: English Harbour

History
- Built: 1797

Historical Site of Antigua and Barbuda

The Sail Loft Pillars, also known as the Sail Loft Columns or Boat House Pillars, are a historic site in Nelson's Dockyard, English Harbour. It is one of the Antigua Naval Dockyard and Related Archaeological Sites, a UNESCO World Heritage Site. They were built in 1797 and once supported the now-destroyed Sail Loft building– a building similar in appearance to the Sawpit Shed.
