= Pre-Columbian Antigua and Barbuda =

Pre-Columbian Antigua and Barbuda included the Archaic tribes, the Arawak, (Note: Specifically the eastern branch of the Taíno) and the Kalinago. The oldest major site on Antigua dates to c. 3106 BC, and the oldest site on Barbuda dates to c. 3685 BC. The Kalinago primarily referred to Antigua as Wa'ladli, Barbuda as Wa'omoni, and Redonda as Ocananmanrou.

== Name ==
Pre-Columbian cultures used several names to refer to the islands that make up the present day name of Antigua and Barbuda. Kenneth Dick finds the following indigenous names for Antigua in Spanish and other colonial literature (including spelling variations):

| Name | Source | Language | Meaning |
|---|---|---|---|
| Otialadli Waladli Wa'ladli | F. Raymond Breton (1666) | Kalinago | Island of fish oil |
| Warladli | Desmond V. Nicholson | Kalinago | Island of fish oil |
| Warikad | Desmond V. Nicholson | Kalinago | Island of rape |
| Yarumaqui | Desmond V. Nicholson | Arawak (Note: Eastern Taíno dialect) | Dagger tree island |

The same source records that Barbuda was referred to as Ouahomoni (spelling variation of the more commonly used Wa'omoni; according to Breton), and that Redonda was referred to as Ocanamainrou (now spelled as Ocananmanrou), also according to Breton. None of the country's other islands are mentioned in the work.

== History ==
=== Archaic period (c. 3000–250 BC) ===
The Archaic tribes were hunter-gatherers, usually traveling in small groups rather than living in villages. The most important archaic sites include Twenty Hill, River (Barbuda), and Jolly Beach. They likely discovered Antigua and Barbuda on canoes originating from Central or South America. Their language is unknown and were characterised by shell and stone tools. According to carbon dating, the oldest discovered minor site on Antigua dates back to 3106 BC in Little Deep, and the oldest discovered site on Barbuda dating to 3685 BC in the River area.

=== Ceramic and post-Saladoid periods (c. 500 BC–1500 AD) ===
The Ceramic period began with the arrival of Arawak, specifically the eastern Taíno, from Venezuela. They arrived by canoe up the Caribbean islands. They were agricultural, made pottery, and established the first villages. They at first coexisted with the Archaic tribes, resulting in an overlap between the eras. Some historians have said that the Kalinago (Island Caribs) likely replaced the Arawaks, but because of nearly no evidence of cultural change other than less advanced pottery, this has been hard to make certain. It is thought that if this theory is correct, that the two groups coexisted and mixed. Nevertheless, there is documented Kalinago presence on the islands during the colonial era.

One source states that the Arawak inhabited Antigua from c. 35 AD to c. 1100 AD, later being replaced by the ceramic-making Saladoids, who were replaced by the Kalinago in 1500 AD. These people are known to have maintained many fishing villages. The most recent carbon dated site in the country dates to 1505 AD in Indian Town, Barbuda. Kalinago attacks on Codrington from Dominica and Saint Vincent continued until the early 1700s.

== Culture ==
The Arawaks and Kalinago did not wear clothes, but on occasion would wear a belt or an apron. They had long hair with a fringe near the eyebrows, and women would comb the men's hair and grease it to make it appear darker. The Kalinago would flatten babies' foreheads to appear more attractive. Modified fish vertebrae were used to make earrings. Necklaces were made using transparent fish bones and seashells, snail shells and bird feathers were also used. People would often redden their body daily to please their enemies, and used black face paint from gum tree root. The face paint was used during feasts and fighting.

=== Cuisine ===
Most food was obtained by fishermen, with fish being shot with bow and arrows, and then being retrieved through diving. Digging sticks were used to make gardens and fire was used to clear forests. Food was often roasted on a boucan, which left an ash layer that was scraped off. Cassava was the staple food of the islanders, as it traveled well on their canoes and could be processed to make flour. Red-rumped agouti was a species of rodent that was hunted by dogs and was smoked and boiled in cassava juice. Large birds were grilled and small birds were boiled. Fish and crabs were also boiled. Tomali (now known in Antigua as pepper pot) was a method of food storage that 17th-century missionaries described as unhygienic. Maize and native fruits were also consumed, as well as alcoholic wi'ku and raw fish eyes.

== Art ==
Amerindians made pottery using flint, stone, and shell tools, which were believed to ward off evil spirits with their designs.

=== Boats ===
The first Arawakan Antiguan boats were hollowed out tree trunks, sometimes having planks on the sides. A boat-building village was likely located near the east of Monks Hill, due to many conch-shell hand adzes and other tools being found in the area. The trees were cut down and hollowed on the spot after a year-long seasoning process. The bare hull was then taken to the village for finishing. For launching, the canoes could be slipped down a steep hill, for example in Falmouth Harbour. The canoes were used for communication, fishing, and inter-island trade.

== Architecture ==
With the arrival of the Arawaks, the first houses and villages were built to tend to their cassava crops. Missionaries and historians have noted that the homes were about 12 feet across and 25 feet high, with a tall central post holding up the roof. The height was used to make rainwater quickly run off the roof. On the top of the roof, a rock was balanced, which was believed to bring good luck to the inhabitants of the house. Hammocks were also hung from the central post of the home to the round surrounding wall.

== Society ==
The Arawakans worshipped three gods, Yocahu, Atabeyra, and Opiyel Wa'obiran. Yocahu was believed to be the supreme god, Atabeyra the goddess of fertility and childbirth, and Opiyel Wa'obiran took the form of a dog and was the guardian of the spirits of the dead. Sprits were believed to live in zemis (or zemies), images that were made of cotton, coral, stones, shells, and other materials. Shamans were medicine men and "priests", who were believed to be able to influence powerful sprits. The villages were administered by elders or chiefs. About 125 prehistoric villages have been identified by archaeologists as of 2022. Narcotics and incense burners were heavily used.

Petrogylphs were believed to be protection from evil spirits. The only known petroglyphs in the country are located in Indian Cave, Barbuda.

== Language ==
The language spoken by the Archaic cultures is unknown. Their successors, the eastern Taíno (more broadly referred to as the Arawak) spoke the eastern dialect of the Taíno language. The Kalinago spoke the Kalinago language. It is likely that towards the end of the period of indigenous settlement on the island, women would speak Taíno and men Kalinago even though they were one homogenous ethnic group: a form of diglossia also seen in the Garifuna language.

== See also ==
- Indigenous peoples of the Caribbean
- List of pre-Columbian sites in Antigua and Barbuda
- Pre-Columbian Jamaica
