= Elliot's (Indigenous site) =

Archaelogical site in Antigua

- location in Antigua and Barbuda
- 17°04′09.89″N 61°43′53.03″W
- Location: near Newfield, Saint Philip, Antigua and Barbuda
- Region: Antigua and Barbuda

Elliot's is a Ceramic period site in Saint Philip, Antigua and Barbuda. It is about 1.4 kilometres from the nearest major village, Newfield. It is located along Ayers Creek and was likely a permanent settlement, with evidence of agriculture. Religious icons, decorations, and ceramics have all been found at the site.
