= Highland Road =

Archaelogical site in Barbuda

- location in Antigua and Barbuda
- 17°39′59.00″N 61°47′39.54″W
- Location: East Coast, Barbuda, Antigua and Barbuda
- Region: Antigua and Barbuda

Highland Road is a post-Saladoid site in Barbuda. It is about 4.1 kilometres from the nearest major village, Codrington. It is located close to the colonial Highland House site. It was studied by David Watters in the 1980s and 1990s. This site was likely a village with similar characteristics to other post-Saladoid findings.
