= Desmond V. Nicholson =

Antiguan-British author (1925–2006)

Desmond Vernon Nicholson
- Born: July 9, 1925; Southsea, Hampshire
- Died: January 24, 2006 (aged 80)
- Occupations: Soldier; Historian

Desmond Vernon Nicholson was an Antiguan-British author, soldier, and historian who wrote over twenty books and articles about Antigua and Barbuda in his retirement. Born in Southsea, Hampshire, Nicholson served in the Royal Corps of Signals from 1946 to 1948. Nicholson's father, V. E. B. Nicholson, had been involved in the restoration of Nelson's Dockyard and he himself decided to move to the island in the 1980s during his retirement.

In addition to his several books, Nicholson also founded the Historical and Archaeological Society (1971), the Museum of Antigua and Barbuda, and assisted in the restoration of the dockyard. He was appointed director of the Dockyard Museum in 1996 and also assisted in the foundation of Antigua Sailing Week.

Nicholson participated in the 1947 AAA Championships, and was the champion for the high jump.

== Selected works ==
- Nicholson, Desmond V. (1983). English Harbour, Antigua: An Historical and Archaeological Sketch. Antigua Archaeological Society.
- Nicholson, Desmond V. (1983). The Story of the Arawaks in Antigua and Barbuda. Antigua Archaeological Society. ISBN 978-0-900001-17-8.
- Nicholson, Desmond V. (1991). Antigua, Barbuda and Redonda: A Historical Sketch. Museum of Antigua and Barbuda.
- Nicholson, Desmond V. (1984). Place Names in Antigua & Barbuda. Antigua Archeol. & Hist. Soc.
- Nicholson, Desmond V. (2001). Heritage Landmarks: Antigua and Barbuda. Museum of Antigua and Barbuda.
- Multer, H. Gray; Weiss, Malcolm Pickett; Nicholson, Desmond V. (1986). Antigua: Reefs, Rocks & Highroads of History. Leeward Islands Science Associates.
