= Old Road, Antigua and Barbuda =

Old Road
- Town
- Town of Old Road
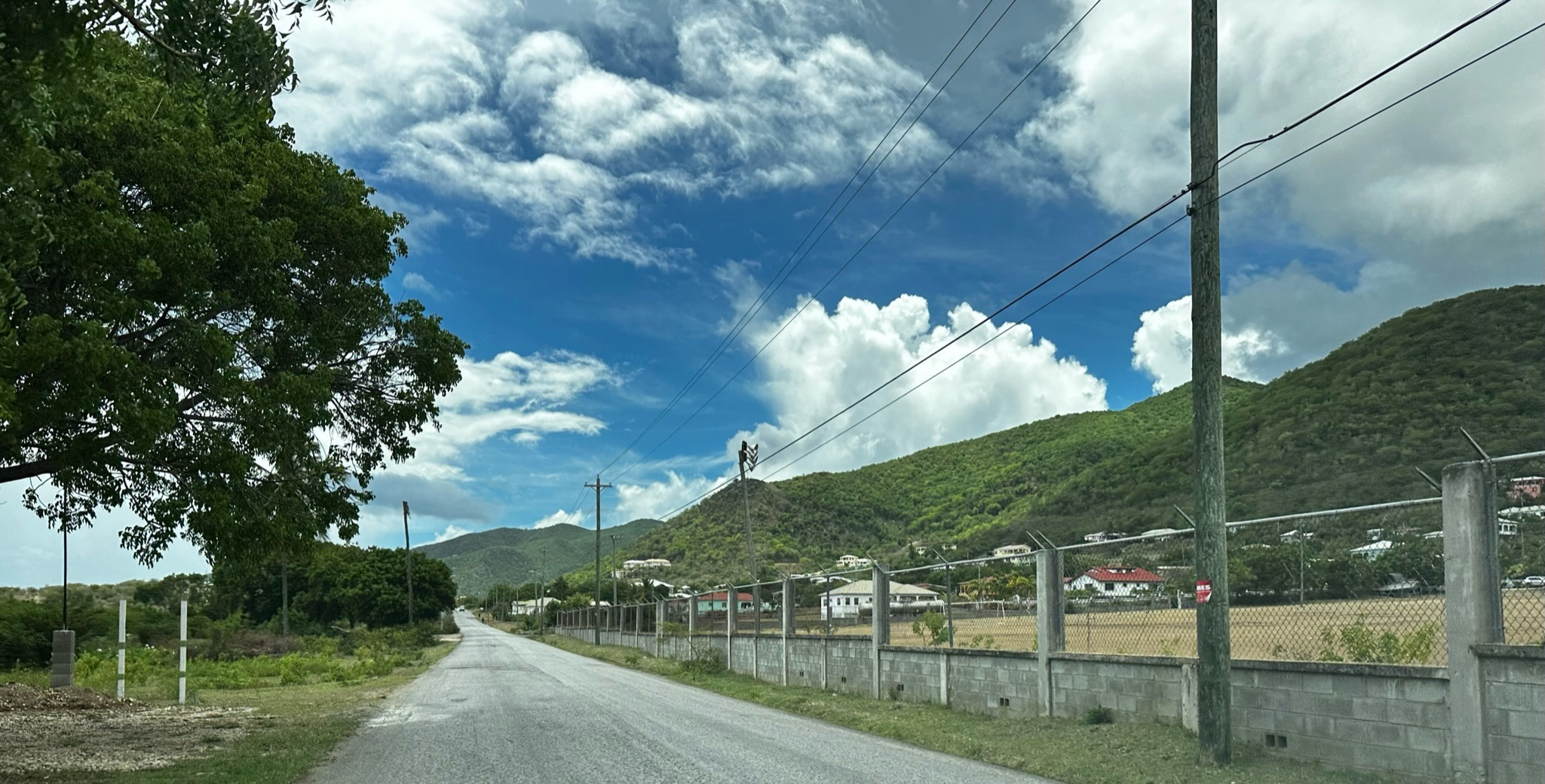
- Old Road in 2023
- Interactive map of the Old Road main place
- Location within Antigua and Barbuda
- Coordinates: 17°01′N 61°50′W
- Country: Antigua and Barbuda
- Island: Antigua
- Parish: Saint Mary
- Division: Old Road
- Founded: 1700s

Area
  - Total: 10.325 km^{2} (3.987 sq mi)

Population (2011)
  - Total: 1,251
  - Density: 121.16/km^{2} (313.8/sq mi)
- Time zone: UTC-4 (AST)

Old Road (South Antiguan: Hol' Roud [(h)ɔl roʊd]), officially known as the Town of Old Road, is a town located on a roadstead in the parish of Saint Mary, Antigua and Barbuda. It is overlooked by Boggy Peak, which lies to its northwest. Old Road was founded in the 1700s, and in the 1850s was still a tiny settlement of 96, smaller than its neighbour to the west, Urlings. Old Road has since grown to a population of 1,251 in 2011, and is now the tenth largest settlement in the country. Old Road is smaller than Willikies, but is larger than Montclear, Skyline, and Potters Village. Old Road is separated from much of Antigua by the Shekerley Mountains. The village is located on Andy Roberts Drive which to the east, merges onto Fig Tree Drive leading to John Hughes, and to the west, continues through Urlings, Crabs Hill, and Johnsons Point before merging onto Valley Road in Ffryes village.

Old Road contains a sports complex, Morris Bay beach, Carlisle Bay beach, and the St. Mary's parish church. Old Road also has a primary school, and in sports, is home to the Old Road F.C. and a cricket club.

== History ==
=== Pre-independence ===
Old Road was historically home to a few sugar estates in the 1700s, such as Morris' estate. A map from the sugar era also suggests other sugar estates in what is now Old Road. The town was formerly known as Carlisle Road. In 1856, Old Road had 96 people—49 women and 47 men. There were seventeen freehold tenures, seven leasehold tenures, and one tenancy at will. There were 25 occupied homes in the town.

=== Post-independence ===
Since the founding of the town in 1700s, the town has since grown to a population of 1,251 in 2011, making it the country's tenth largest settlement. Old Road has been dominated by the United Progressive Party, with all of the polling stations in the town being overwhelmingly dominated by the party in the 2023 Antiguan general election.

== Geography ==
Old Road is located in the southwestern portion of Antigua and is overlooked by the Shekerley Mountains. Old Road has six neighbourhoods and enumeration districts, Old Road North, Claremont, Old Road Central, Old Road Morris Bay, and the neighbourhoods of Old Road West #1 and #2. Morris Bay and Claremont are the two neighbourhoods with sea access, the other neighbourhoods are landlocked. Old Road borders Urlings to the west, Boggy Peak enumeration district to the north, John Hughes to the north, and Swetes, Liberta, and Dieppe Bay to the east.

== Demographics ==
Population census
Year	Pop.	±% p.a.
1856	96	—
1991	1,029	+1.77%
2001	1,093	+0.61%
2011	1,251	+1.36%
Source: 1856 Census, 2001 Census, 1991 Census

There were six enumeration districts in Old Road for the 2011 census. Old Road had a population of 1,251 in 2011. 33.45% of the population was Adventist, 26.44% were Moravian, 23.40% were Anglican, 1.35% had none/no religion, 0.42% were Rastafarian, and the remainder were of varioius other denominations and faiths. 97.64% of the population was African descendant, 0.51% were white, 0.08% were Indian (India), 0.08% were mixed black/white, 0.42% were other mixed, 0.34% were Hispanic, 0.34% were some other ethnicity, and 0.59% didn't know or didn't state. 90.04% of the population was born in Antigua and Barbuda, 0.51% in other Caribbean countries, 0.25% in Canada, 0.25% in other Asian countries, 2.36% in Dominica, 0.17% in the Dominican Republic, 0.68% in Guyana, 0.42% in Jamaica, 0.17% in Montserrat, 0.42% in St. Kitts and Nevis, 0.08% in St. Lucia, 0.08% in St. Vincent and the Grenadines, 0.08% in Trinidad and Tobago, 0.93% in the United Kingdom, 1.86% in the United States, 0.93% in the U.S. Virgin Islands, and 0.76% not stated.

== Economy ==
In 2011, 950 residents were asked their job status. The majority (62.67%) had a job and worked, followed by those who were retired (13.44%). Of the 61 business owners in the town, 27.59% had their business make under 1,000 $EC per month, 24.14% made 1,000 to 1,999 $EC per month, 22.41% made 2,000 to 2,999 $EC per month, 8.62% made 3,000 to 4,999 $EC per month, and 17.24% made 5,000 $EC and over per month. Out of the 585 workers in Old Road, 22.38% were paid government employees, 1.99% were paid statutory body employees, 56.50% were paid private employees, 1.81% were private home employees, 3.07% were self-employed with paid employees, 12.82% were self-employed without paid employees, 0.90% had another worker status, and 0.54% didn't know or didn't state. 950 people received money from overseas. 98.56% received under EC$100, 0.33% received 100 to 499 EC$, 0.44% received 500 to 999 EC$, 0.44% received 1,000 to 1,999 EC$, 0.11% received 2,000 to 4,999 EC$, and 0.11% received 5,000 to 99,999 EC$.

== Governance and politics ==
In Old Road, there is no local government. Polling district "D" includes Old Road. In the 2023 general elections, all four polling stations were overwhelmingly won by the UPP. Station #1 had 219 electors with 130 UPP votes and 40 ABLP votes, station #2 had 278 electors with 148 UPP votes, 55 ABLP votes, and 4 DNA votes, station #3 had 225 electors with 108 UPP votes, 60 ABLP votes, and one rejected ballot, and station #4 had 169 electors, with 92 UPP votes, 28 ABLP votes, and 1 DNA vote. It is not stated by the Ministry of Public Safety what division the town is patrolled by, however, the closest division to the town is the "D" division, and the closest police station to the town is in Johnsons Point.

== Infrastructure ==
=== Housing ===
In 2011, there were 419 households in the town. 1.67% of dwellings used concrete as the main material of outer walls, 36.04% used concrete blocks, 34.13% used wood, 1.19% used wood and brick, 26.25% used wood and concrete, 0.24% used wood and galvanized, and 0.48% used another material. 2.63% of dwellings used concrete as the main roofing material, 63.72% used sheet metal, 3.82% used asphalt shingles, 28.64% used other shingles, 0.48% used wood shingles, and 0.72% used other materials. 96.66% of dwellings were separate dwellings, 0.95% were part of a private house, 0.48% were duplexes, 0.48% were business & dwellings, 1.19% were other types of dwellings including townhouses and barracks, and 0.24% dn/ns. 1.91% of land tenures are leasehold, 67.06% are owned or freeheld, 12.41% are rented, 11.46% are rented free, 0.95% are other tenures, and 6.21% dn/ns. 12.65% of dwellings are owned with mortgage, 68.02% are owned outright, 1.91% are rent free, 10.50% are rented private, 1.43% are other, and 5.49% dn/ns.

== Neighbourhoods ==
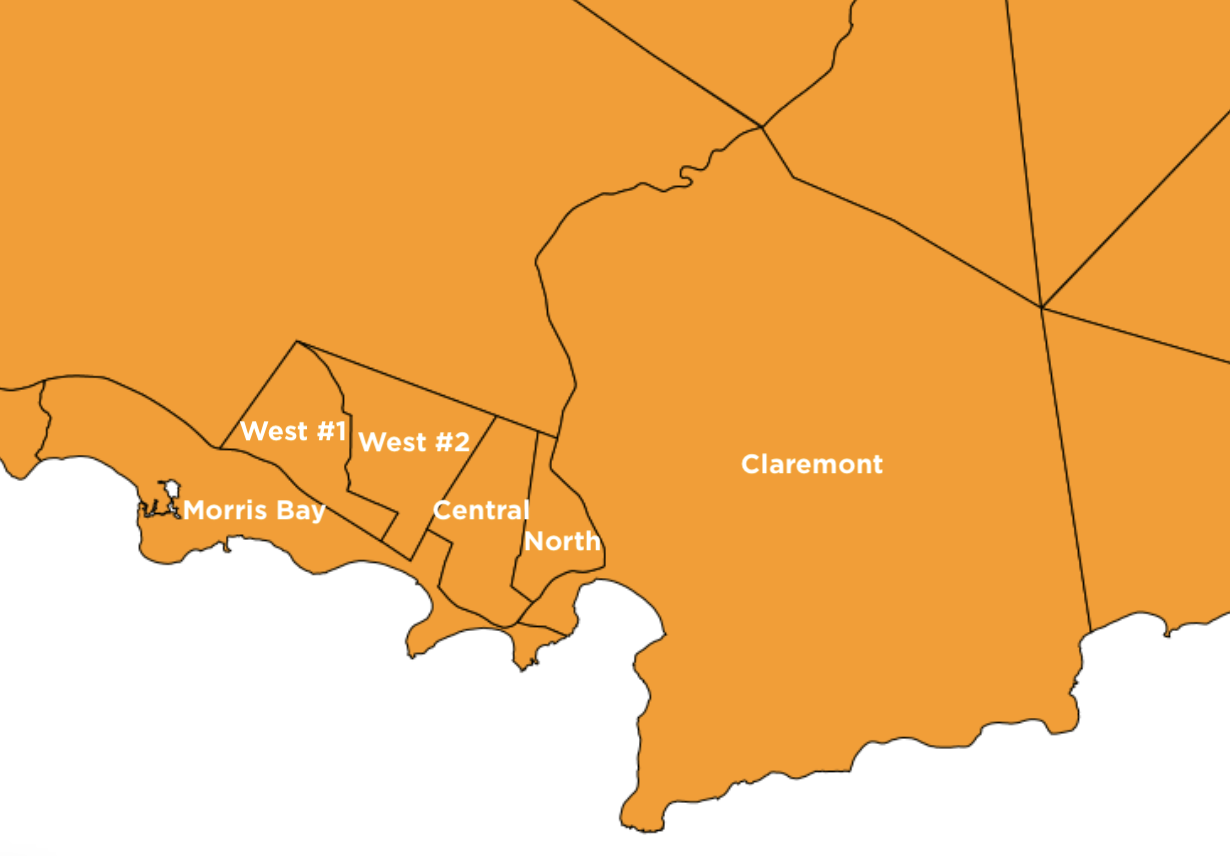
Old Road neighbourhood map

=== Old Road North ===
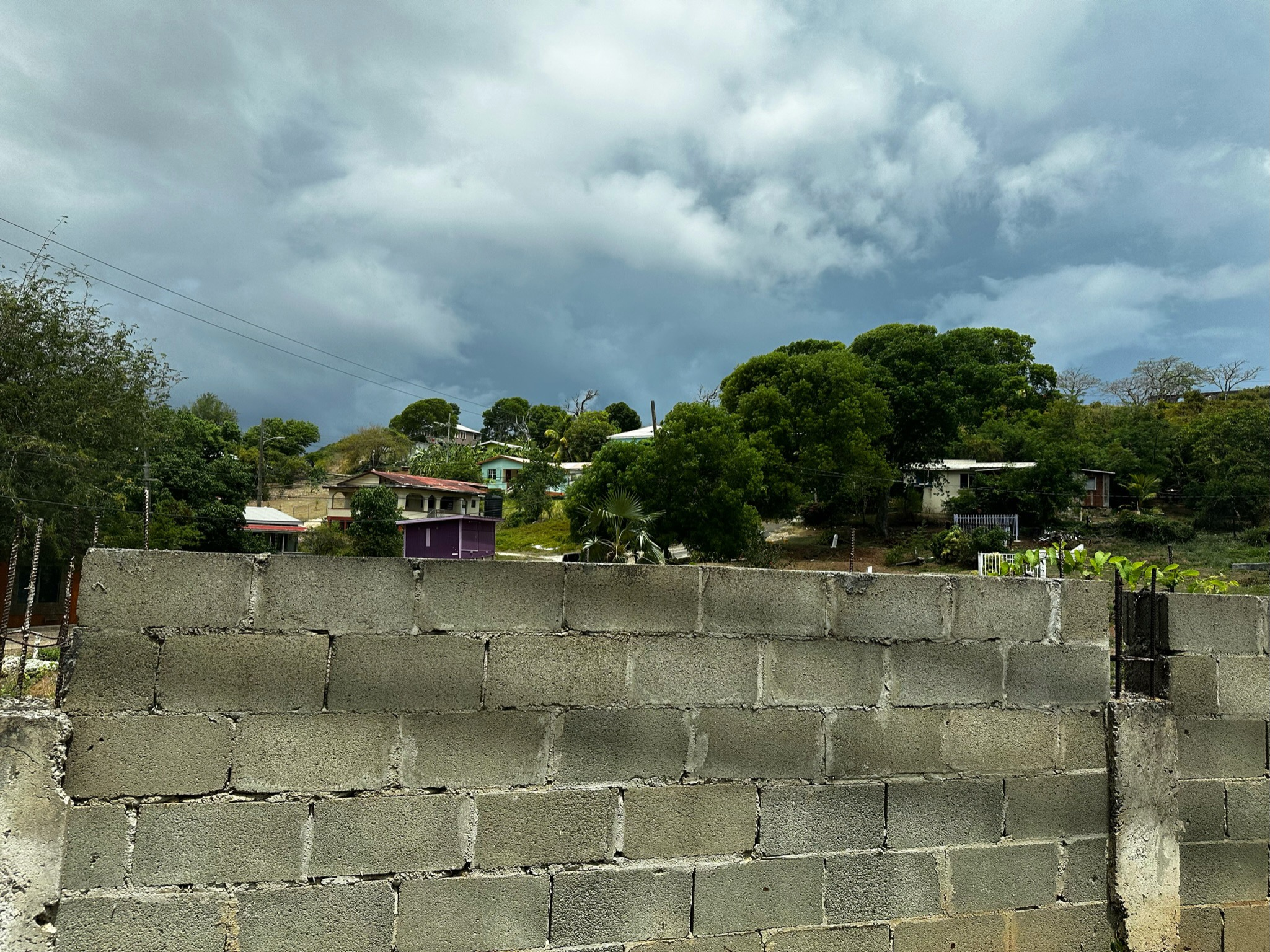
Houses in Old Road North, 2023

This neighbourhood coincides with enumeration district 80800 and is 0.23 square km. In 2011, 201 people lived in this neighbourhood. 97.37% of the population was born in Antigua and Barbuda, 0.53% in Dominica, 0.53% in Guyana, 0.53% in the United States, and 1.05% not stated. 98.95% of the population was African descendant, 0.53% was other mixed, and 0.53% didn't know or didn't state. 41.58% of the population was Adventist, 20.53% were Anglican, 12.63% were Moravian, and 2.11% were irreligious. The remainder were various other denominations and faiths.

=== Old Road Claremont ===
This neighbourhood coincides with enumeration district 80900 and is 7.75 square km. In 2011, the neighbourhood had 174 people. 99.39% were African descendant and 0.61% were white. 26.67% were Adventist, 32.12% were Anglican, 24.85% were Moravian, 0.61% were none/no religion, and the remainder were various other denominations and faiths. 95.76% of the population was born in Antigua and Barbuda, 0.61% in Canada, 0.61% in Dominica, 1.21% in Jamaica, 0.61% in the United Kingdom, and 1.21% in the U.S. Virgin Islands.

=== Old Road Central ===
This neighbourhood coincides with enumeration district 81000 and is 0.42 square km. In 2011, the neighbourhood had 214 people. 94.09% of the population was African descendant, 0.99% were white, 0.49% were East Indian, 0.49% were mixed black/white, 1.97% were other mixed, 0.49% were some other ethnicity, and 1.48% didn't know or didn't state. 86.21% of the population was born in Antigua and Barbuda, 1.48% were born in other Caribbean countries, 2.96% in Dominica, 0.99% in Guyana, 0.99% in Jamaica, 0.99% in the United Kingdom, 3.45% in the United States, 0.49% in the USVI, and 2.46% not stated.

=== Old Road Morris Bay ===
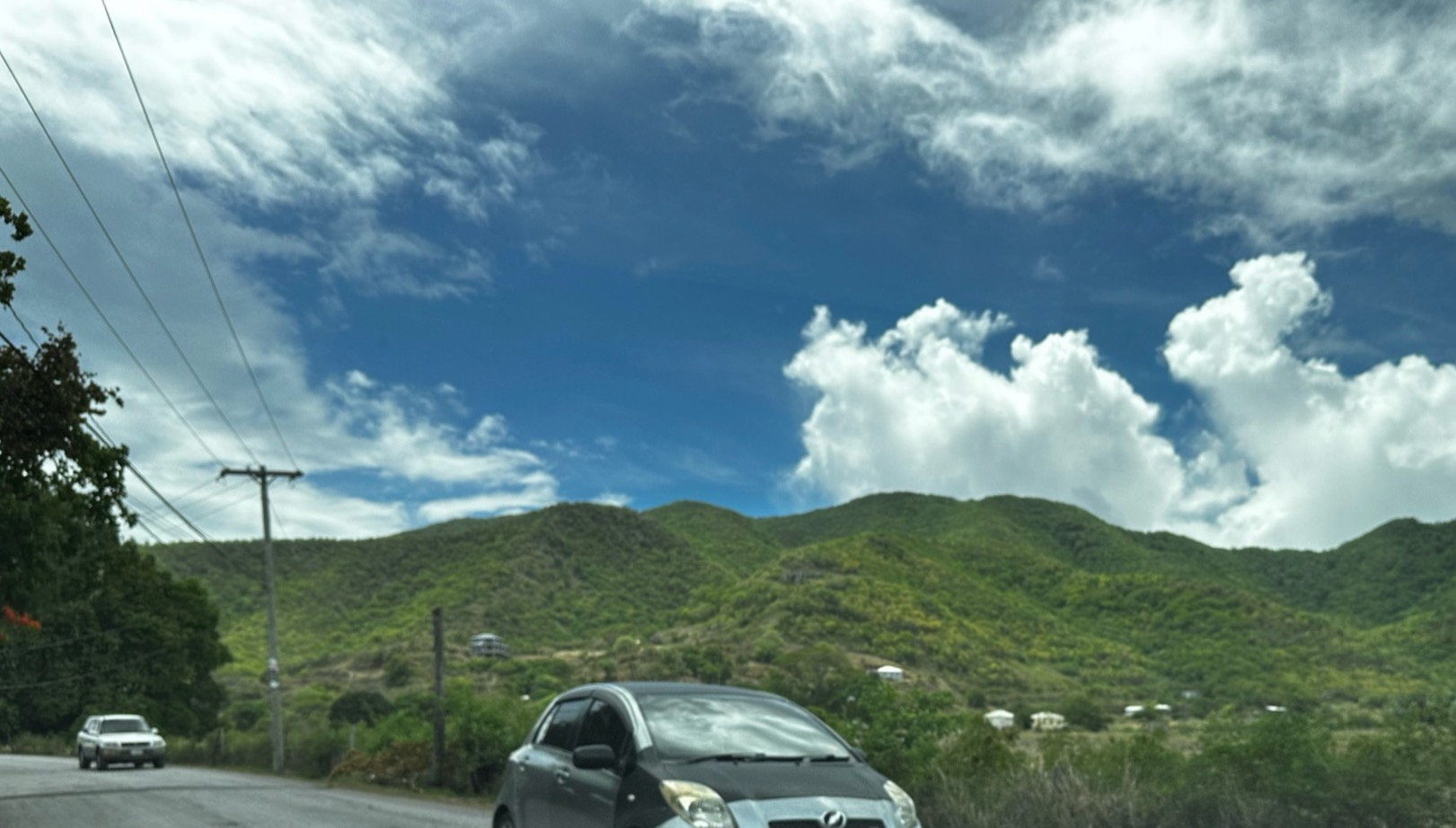
A location in Morris Bay, 2023

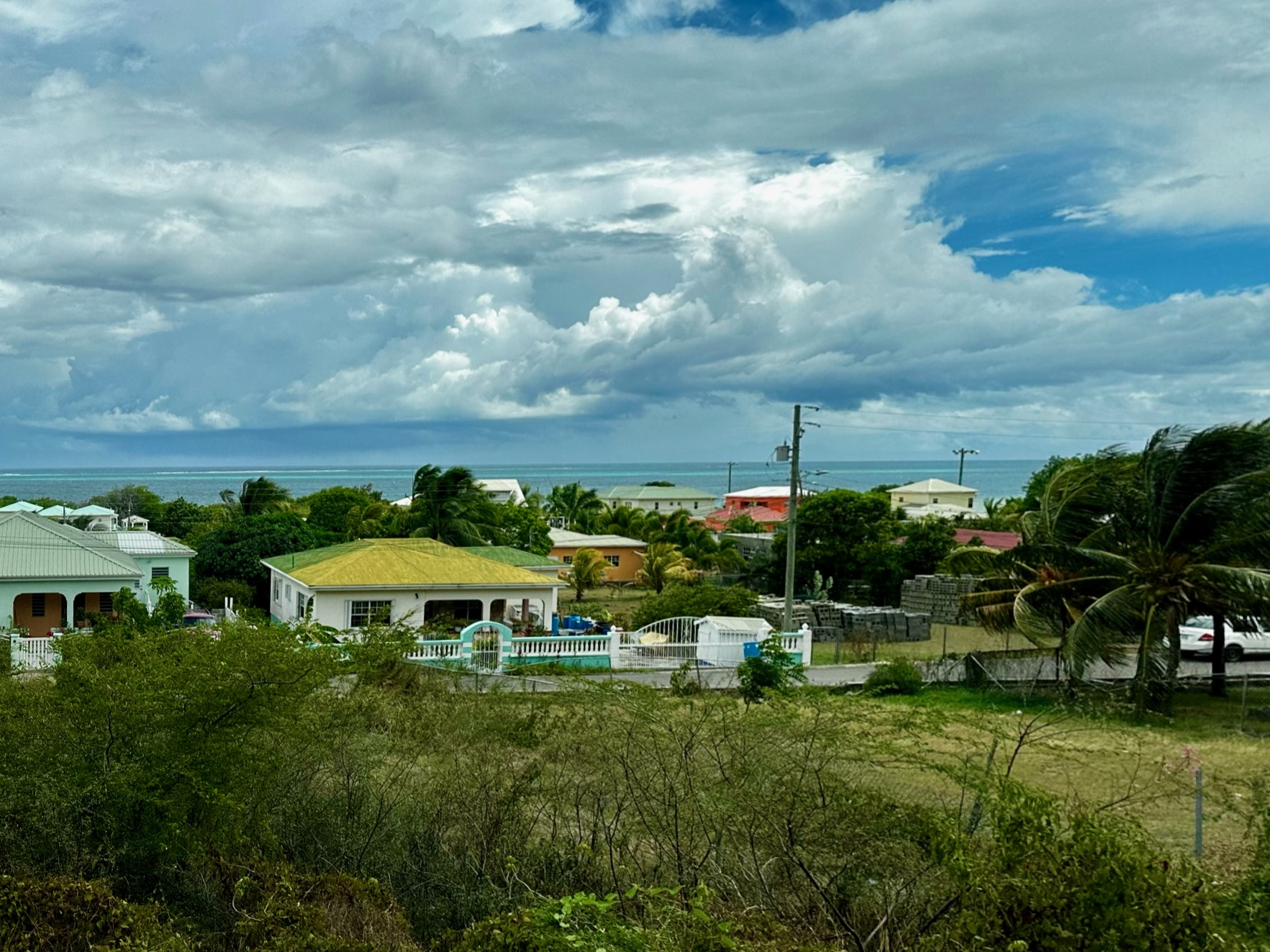
Seaside houses in Morris Bay, 2023

This neighbourhood coincides with enumeration district 81100 and is 1.03 square km. In 2011, the neighbourhood had 216 people. 98.54% of the population is African descendant, 0.98% are white, and 0.49% are Hispanic. 36.59% of the population is Adventist, 23.41% are Anglican, 28.29% are Moravian, 1.95% are irreligious, 0.49% are Rastafarian, and the remainder are various other denominations and faiths. 85.85% of the population was born in Antigua and Barbuda, 0.98% in other Caribbean countries, 0.49% in Canada, 2.93% in Dominica, 0.49% in Guyana, 0.98% in Montserrat, 1.95% in St. Kitts and Nevis, 2.44% in the United Kingdom, 1.95% in the United States, and 1.95% in the USVI.

=== Old Road West (1) ===
This neighbourhood coincides with enumeration district 81201 and is 0.395 square km. In 2011, the neighbourhood had 234 people. 93.24% of the population was born in Antigua and Barbuda, 0.45% in other Caribbean countries, 0.90% in Dominica, 0.45% in Guyana, 0.45% in Trinidad and Tobago, 0.45% in the United Kingdom, 2.70% in the United States, 0.90% in the USVI, and 0.45% not stated. 39.19% of the population was Adventist, 16.67% were Anglican, 31.98% were Moravian, and the remainder were various other denominations and faiths. 99.55% of the population was African descendant and 0.45% were Hispanic.

=== Old Road West (2) ===
This neighbourhood coincides with enumeration district 81202 and is 0.5 square km. In 2011, the neighbourhood had 211 people. 37.50% of the population was Adventist, 26.50% were Anglican, and 20.50% were Moravian, the remainder of the population was of various other denominations and faiths. 83.00% of the population was born in Antigua and Barbuda, 0.50% in Canada, 1.50% in other Asian countries, 6.00% in Dominica, 1.00% in the Dominican Republic, 1.50% in Guyana, 0.50% in Jamaica, 0.50% in St. Kitts and Nevis, 0.50% in St. Lucia, 0.50% in St. Vincent and the Grenadines, 1.00% in the United Kingdom, 2.00% in the United States, 1.00% in the USVI, and 0.50% not stated. 95.50% of the population was African descendant, 0.50% were white, 1.00% were Hispanic, 1.50% were some other ethnicity, and 1.50% didn't know or didn't state.

== See also ==
- Urlings
- Swetes
- Saint Mary, Antigua and Barbuda
