= Indian Creek (Antigua) =

Archaelogical site in Antigua

- Indian Creek in 2026

- location in Antigua and Barbuda
- 17°00′34.76″N 61°44′40.77″W
- Location: near English Harbour, Saint Paul, Antigua and Barbuda
- Region: Antigua and Barbuda

Indian Creek is a Ceramic period site in Saint Paul, Antigua and Barbuda. It is about 2.5 kilometres from the nearest major village, English Harbour. It is the most well known Indigenous site in the country and was an agricultural village used for the farming of cassava. It had a population of about fifty. Based on radiocarbon dating, there was human activity at the site between 200 BC and 1300 AD.
