= Mill Reef (Indigenous site) =

Archaelogical site in Antigua

- location in Antigua and Barbuda
- 17°03′24.15″N 61°40′40.80″W
- Location: near Freetown, Saint Philip, Antigua and Barbuda
- Region: Antigua and Barbuda

Mill Reef is a Ceramic period and post-Saladoid site in Saint Philip, Antigua and Barbuda. It is about 3 kilometres from the nearest major village, Freetown. It is located on the present day Mill Reef Club property and was likely inhabited for about 600 years starting 400 AD.
