= Museum of Antigua and Barbuda =

Coordinates: 17.1222°N 61.8439°W

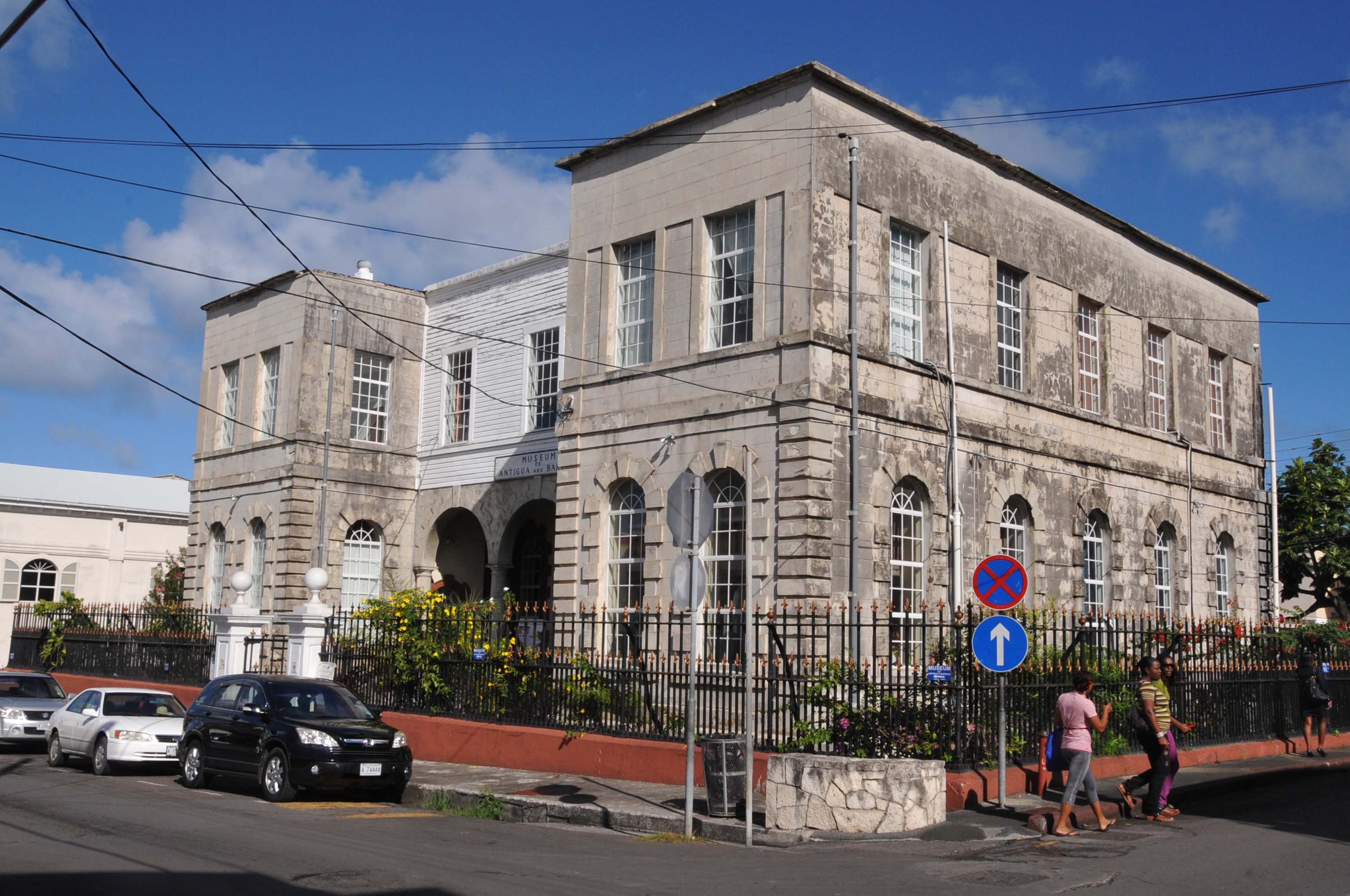
Museum of Antigua and Barbuda

The Museum of Antigua and Barbuda is a museum in St. John's, Antigua and Barbuda. It is housed in the colonial Court House, constructed in 1747 on the site of the first city market, and is the oldest building still in use in the city. The museum displays both Arawak and colonial artifacts recovered on archaeological digs on the islands. It also features a life-sized replica of an Arawak house, models of sugar plantations, along with a history of the island, and Viv Richards' cricket bat. The museum maintains a list of official historic sites in the country.

The museum was founded by Desmond V. Nicholson.

Its collection of sugar cane railway locomotives which once worked on the extensive Antiguan rail system and displayed outside the museum includes :

- No.4 "Marion", a Kerr Stuart 'Brazil' class (steam) (1178/1911)
- No.8 "Bessie", an 'armoured' Motor Rail Simplex (petrol) (466/1917)
- No.13, an American built Plymouth BL1 Type 1 (petrol) (743/1919)
- No.15 "Paul" Hudson-Hunslet (diesel) (3442/1946)
