= Boiling Rocks =

Archaelogical site in Barbuda

- location in Antigua and Barbuda
- 17°33′10.07″N 61°44′35.86″W
- Location: Salt Lake, Barbuda, Antigua and Barbuda
- Region: Antigua and Barbuda

Boiling Rocks is an Archaic period site in Barbuda. It is located near Spanish Point on Gravenor Bay, about 13 kilometres from the nearest major village, Codrington. It is one of the oldest Indigenous sites in the country, with human remains at the site being carbon dated to about 3,100 years ago.
