= Seaview (Barbuda) =

Archaelogical site in Barbuda

- location in Antigua and Barbuda
- 17°40′44.38″N 61°46′46.93″W
- Location: Two Foot Bay, Barbuda, Antigua and Barbuda
- Region: Antigua and Barbuda

Seaview is a Ceramic period site in Barbuda. It is about 6.2 kilometres from the nearest major village, Codrington. It was a large village, likely inhabited continuously between 100 BC and 650 AD. Excavations at the site in January 2011 determined that this village was likely built around a central plaza. Cooking pits, spoons, used flint tools, and other artifacts have been found here.
