= Johnsons Point =

Village in Antigua

- Village
- Interactive map of the Johnsons Point main place
- Location in Antigua and Barbuda
- Coordinates: 17°01′42″N 61°53′06″W
- Country: Antigua and Barbuda
- Island: Antigua
- Civil parish: Saint Mary Parish

Government
  - Type: Village Council (possibly dissolved)
  - MP: Dwayne George

Area
  - Total: 0.61 km^{2} (0.24 sq mi)

Population (2011)
  - Total: 204
  - Density: 330/km^{2} (870/sq mi)
- Time zone: UTC-4 (AST)

Johnsons Point is a village in Saint Mary, Antigua and Barbuda. It is located in the foothills of the Shekerley Mountains on Antigua's southwestern Caribbean coast, southeast of Crabbs Hill and west of Urlings. The village had a population of 204 in 2011 over 0.61 square kilometres. The village is home to several ponds and wetlands, as well as some beaches along its southern coastline. The village has a police and fire station and once had a Moravian-affiliated primary school.

== Geography ==
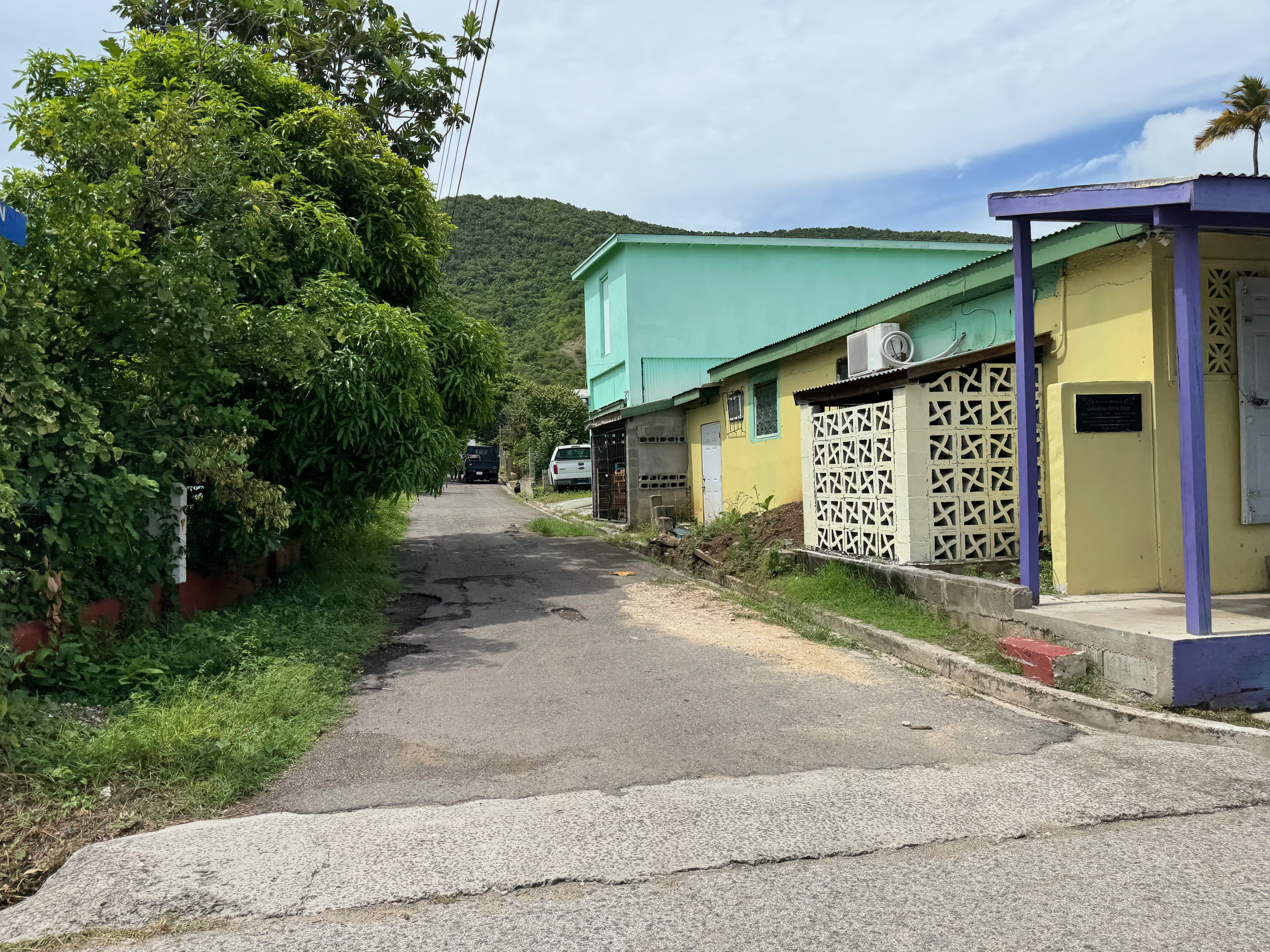
A street in the village

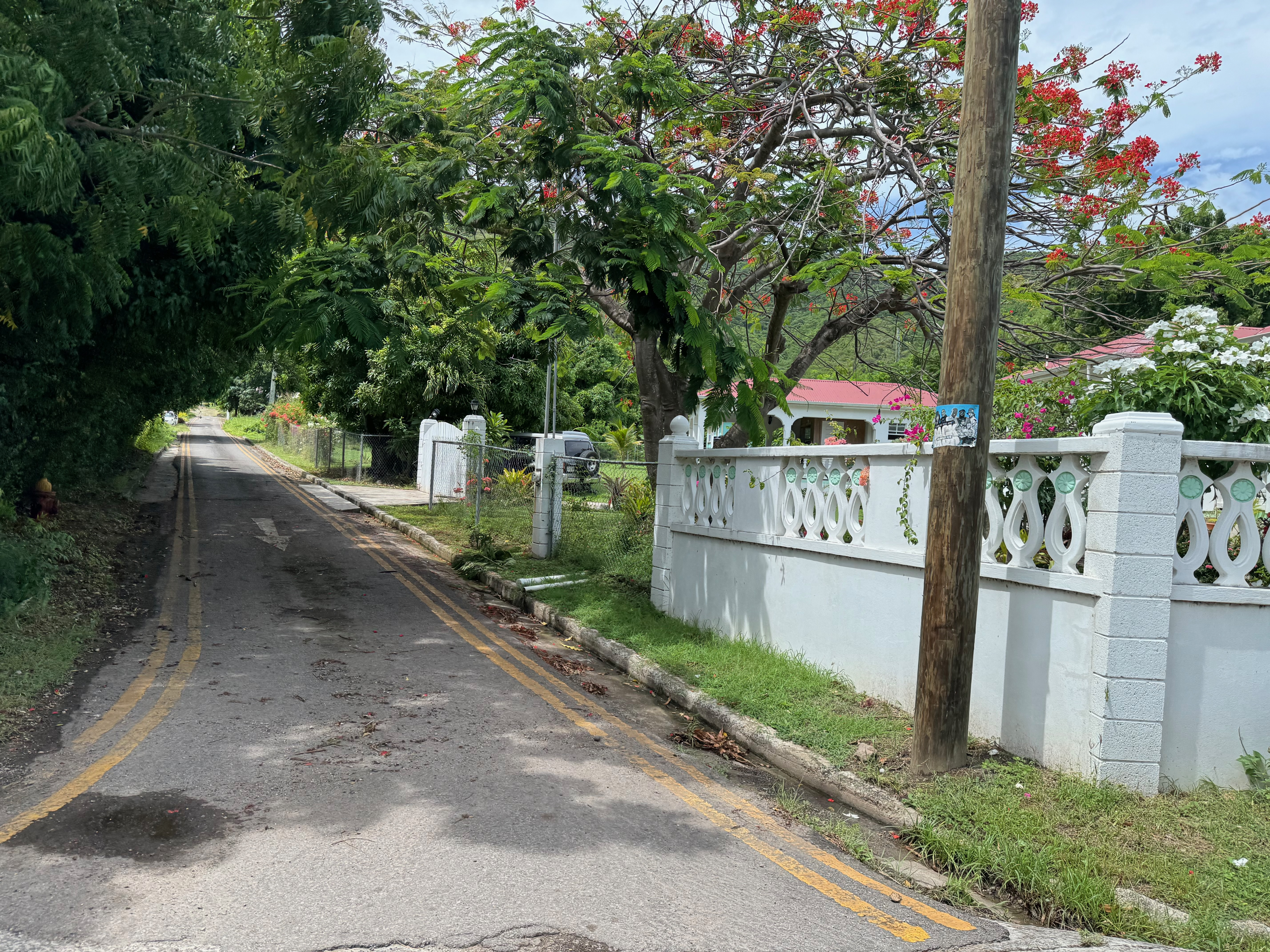
Hunte Road

According to the National Bureau of Statistics, Johnsons Point has a land area of 0.61 square kilometres in one enumeration district. The village is located at the foothills of the Shekerley Mountains, with much of the northern portion of the village being covered by the Leeward Islands moist forests. Land in the central portion of the village is primarily used for rural settlement. The southern portion of the village along the coast is mostly covered by swamps and mangroves. The village is bounded to the south by the Cades Bay Marine Reserve. A small island named Johnson Island (or Pelican Island) is off its coast at (17°01′30.76″N 61°53′27.88″W). There are several water bodies in the village, mostly in the wetlands near the coast.

The village is located in Antigua's volcanic formation. Much of the village is at very high risk for landslides except for some areas along the coast. The village is at moderate risk for drought. The elevation of the village varies widely– the most densely populated area in the geographic centre of the village has an elevation of about 13 metres.

Johnsons Point is about 0.9 kilometres west of Urlings, 0.7 kilometres southeast of Crabbs Hill, 4 kilometres south of Bolans and Jolly Harbour, and 4.3 kilometres west of Old Road. Johnsons Point is bounded to the north by the Boggy Peak locality, to the northwest by Crabbs Hill, and to the east by Urlings. Notable geographic locations in the village include Johnsons Point Beach. The village is located between Crabbs Hill and Urlings on Valley Road.

== History ==
Unlike many of the other villages of Antigua, Johnsons Point is not known to have had any sugar estates within its boundaries. However, a military fort was located here that is now in ruins. In the 1856 census, Johnsons Point was recorded as having a population of 162 people: 80 men and 82 women in 23 homes.

In 1888, Johnsons Point was listed as having a coeducational Moravian school. This school appeared on the 1933 Camacho map which also noted the existence of a reservoir in the village, which was constructed around 1895. The village had struggled with the provision of water around this time, with a November 1895 report describing the village's public cistern as being in an "unsatisfactory state".

On 24 June 1897, Johnsons Point was assigned to military district 6 which also included other villages along the island's southwestern coast. On 30 May 1901, the governor formed a commission to investigate the dismissal of a man named Port Christopher at the village's school. In the 1910s it was noted that residents in Crabbs Hill and Johnsons Point were complaining about the lengthy distance between them and the courthouse for their magisterial district in St. John's. On 9 February 1914 two women in the village were crushed to death by a wooden house that had just been physically carried from St. John's to Johnsons Point hours before. On 4 December 1950, John Sebastian was mentioned as being the chairperson of the Crabbs Hill and Johnsons Point village council. In the 1958 West Indian federal elections, persons from the Johnsons Point station overwhelmingly voted to support Novelle Richards and Bradley Carrott.

In 1991, Johnsons Point had a population of 231, and in 2001 it had a population of 155.

== Demographics ==
In 2011, Johnsons Point had a total population of 204 in one enumeration district. African descendants made up 94.30% of the population, followed by whites (2.59%), unknown (2.07%), and other mixed (1.04%). 62% of the population was Anglican with significant minorities of Adventists (10%) and Moravians (6%). 83.94% of the village was born in Antigua and Barbuda, with other countries of birth including the United Kingdom (6.22%), the United States (3.11%), and Dominica (2.07%).

In 2011, Johnsons Point had 81 households. About 90% of houses in the village used sheet metal roofs. 54.32% used concrete blocks for their outer walls, with smaller numbers using wood (29.63%) and a combination of wood and concrete (8.64%). Of the population born in Antigua and Barbuda, 22.70% have lived abroad at some point in their life.

== Features ==
The village can be accessed by Valley Road which connects it to St. John's northbound and Fig Tree Drive eastbound. In addition to Fort Johnsons Point and some beaches along the coast, there are several other locations in the village including a small grocery store, several tourist apartments, and Nelson's Rock (17°1′34.69″N 61°53′0.06″W). The village has a police and fire station which services much of the southwest coast.
