= Coolidge, Antigua and Barbuda =

Village/Community in Antigua

Coolidge
- Village
- An apartment building in 2023
- Interactive map of the Coolidge main place
- Location within Antigua and Barbuda
- Coordinates: 17°08′52″N 61°47′49″W
- Country: Antigua and Barbuda
- Island: Antigua
- Parish: Saint George

Area
  - Total: 1.90 km^{2} (0.73 sq mi)

Population (2011)
  - Total: 267
  - Density: 140.53/km^{2} (364.0/sq mi)
- Time zone: UTC-4

Coolidge is a village in Saint George Parish, Antigua and Barbuda.

== Demographics ==
Coolidge has one enumeration district, ED 41900 Coolidge, the enumeration district is "high-income" and has an income weight of 3.18, the village had a population of 267 in 2011.

=== Census data ===
Q48 Ethnic	Counts	%
African descendent	113	42.46%
Caucasian/White	7	2.78%
East Indian/India	4	1.59%
Mixed (Black/White)	13	4.76%
Mixed (Other)	84	31.35%
Hispanic	6	2.38%
Syrian/Lebanese	22	8.33%
Other	16	5.95%
Don't know/Not stated	1	0.40%
Total	267	100.00%

Q91 Business Earning (Earnings a business made)	Counts	%
1,000 to $1,999 EC per month	4	16.67%
2,000 to $2,999 EC per month	5	20.83%
3,000 to $4,999 EC per month	6	25.00%
$5,000 EC and over per month	10	37.50%
Total	25	100.00%
NotApp :	240	
Missing :	1	

Employment status	Counts	%
Employed	146	66.35%
Unemployed	3	1.44%
Inactive	70	31.73%
Not stated	1	0.48%
Total	220	100.00%
NotApp :	47	

Q71 Country of Citizenship 1	Counts	%
Antigua and Barbuda	212	79.37%
Other Asian and Middle Eastern countries	8	3.17%
Dominica	1	0.40%
Dominican Republic	4	1.59%
Guyana	3	1.19%
Jamaica	8	3.17%
St. Lucia	5	1.98%
Trinidad and Tobago	2	0.79%
United Kingdom	2	0.79%
USA	11	3.97%
Other countries	5	1.98%
Not Stated	4	1.59%
Total	267	100.00%

Q71 Country of Citizenship 2 (Country of Second Citizenship)	Counts	%
Other Caribbean countries	8	14.29%
Canada	5	8.93%
Other Asian and Middle Eastern countries	2	3.57%
Dominica	3	5.36%
Guyana	7	12.50%
Jamaica	3	5.36%
St. Lucia	1	1.79%
St. Vincent and the Grenadines	1	1.79%
Trinidad and Tobago	10	16.07%
United Kingdom	2	3.57%
USA	10	16.07%
Other countries	6	10.71%
Total	59	100.00%
NotApp :	207	

Q117 MoneyOverseas (Money from relatives and friends overseas)	Counts	%
Under 100 EC$	220	100.00%
Total	220	100.00%
NotApp :	47	

Q55 Internet Use	Counts	%
Yes	206	77.38%
No	46	17.06%
Don't know/Not stated	15	5.56%
Total	267	100.00%

Q49 Religion	Counts	%
Adventist	10	3.61%
Anglican	51	19.28%
Baptist	6	2.41%
Evangelical	1	0.40%
Jehovah Witness	4	1.61%
Methodist	12	4.42%
Moravian	30	11.24%
None/no religion	16	6.02%
Pentecostal	14	5.22%
Roman Catholic	86	32.53%
Weslyan Holiness	6	2.41%
Other	10	3.61%
Don't know/Not stated	19	7.23%
Total	264	100.00%
NotApp :	3	

Q58. Country of birth	Counts	%
Africa	1	0.40%
Other Latin or North American countries	4	1.59%
Antigua and Barbuda	164	61.51%
Other Caribbean countries	3	1.19%
Canada	2	0.79%
Other Asian countries	10	3.57%
Other European countries	6	2.38%
Dominica	3	1.19%
Dominican Republic	5	1.98%
Guyana	10	3.57%
Jamaica	11	3.97%
Monsterrat	1	0.40%
St. Kitts and Nevis	1	0.40%
St. Lucia	5	1.98%
St. Vincent and the Grenadines	1	0.40%
Trinidad and Tobago	8	3.17%
United Kingdom	3	1.19%
USA	18	6.75%
Not Stated	10	3.57%
Total	267	100.00%
