= Hodges Bay =

Coordinates: 17°9′56″N 61°48′30″W

- Village
- A street in 2023
- Interactive map of the Hodges Bay main place
- Country: Antigua and Barbuda
- Parish: Saint John

Area
  - Total: 2.06 km^{2} (0.80 sq mi)

Population (2011)
  - Total: 900

Hodges Bay is a village in Saint John, Antigua and Barbuda. It had a population of 900 people in 2011.

== Geography ==
According to the Antigua and Barbuda Statistics Division, the village had a total area of 2.06 square kilometres in 2011.

== Demographics ==
There were 900 people living in Hodges Bay as of the 2011 census. The village was 49.08% African, 14.48% white, 13.37% other mixed, 9.57% East Indian, 5.89% some other ethnicity, 3.56% mixed black/white, 2.21% Hispanic, and 1.84% Syrian/Lebanese. The population was born in many different countries, including 40.25% in Antigua and Barbuda, 14.60% in the United States, and 6.87% in "other Asian countries". The population had diverse religious affiliations, including 25.34% Catholic, 20.72% Anglican, and 9.24% irreligious.
