= Sawpit Shed, Nelson's Dockyard =

Official historic site of Antigua and Barbuda

Sawpit Shed
- The building in 2026

- Location within Antigua and Barbuda
- 17°00′28.72″N 61°45′56.22″W
- Location: English Harbour

History
- Built: 1769

Historical Site of Antigua and Barbuda

Sawpit Shed is a historic site in Nelson's Dockyard, English Harbour. It is one of the Antigua Naval Dockyard and Related Archaeological Sites, a UNESCO World Heritage Site. It is also the oldest extant building in the complex, dating to 1769. The shed is one-storey tall and was used for the cutting of timber. It is adjacent to the Master Shipwright's Cabin.
