= Post-Saladoid period in Antigua and Barbuda =

Historical period in Antigua and Barbuda

The post-Saladoid period in pre-Columbian Antigua and Barbuda refers to the immediate period before the colonisation of Antigua and Barbuda, commencing with the conclusion of the Ceramic period around 700 AD. Like the previous period, the primary inhabitants were the Arawak (Taíno). The Arawak departed the islands around 1200 AD, and some sources claim that they were succeeded by the Kalinago who inhabited the islands up to the colonial era. The Arawak likely left due to the exhaustion of resources. Similarly to the Ceramic period, the inhabitants of the islands lived in coastal villages, and this period is generally considered to be the peak of indigenous settlement. Agriculture was present and villages were strategically positioned to be close to reefs where fish and other seafood could be accessed. Major post-Saladoid villages on Antigua included Coconut Hall, Mill Reef, Muddy Bay, and Winthorpe's West. The Arawak called Antigua Yarumaqui.

The islands had a primarily marine-based bartering economy during this period. Fish and shellfish remains are often found at post-Saladoid sites. Many settlements from the Ceramic period continued to exist during the Post-Saladoid period. Pottery, albeit less complex during its later years, also continued to be produced around this time. Religious vessels, including ones featuring faces and animals have also been discovered at Muddy Bay. Due to the high supply of chert on Long Island, ancient Antiguans and Barbudans alike would use resources from this island to produce tools. Shell and stone based tools were also used.

While settlement patterns in this era was increasingly sea-based compared to the Ceramic period, inland areas, including the Shekerley Mountains, also had an indigenous presence. The spring at Wallings was used as a source for freshwater. Village sites at Green Castle Hill and Guinea Bush in Saint Paul were still noted to have marine artifacts. It is thought that the Arawak left the islands around 1200 AD after exhausting all the islands' resources.

Following the departure of the Arawak, there are historical accounts of Kalinago habitation on the island. The Kalinago called Antigua Wa'ladli, Barbuda Wa'omoni, and Redonda Ocanamanru. Some Kalinago continued to come to the islands after colonisation, conducting raids with hundreds of participants from Saint Vincent and Dominica as late as 1668 in Barbuda.
