= Muddy Bay (Indigenous site) =

Archaelogical site in Antigua

- location in Antigua and Barbuda
- 17°04′47.41″N 61°42′17.74″W
- Location: near Willikies, Saint Philip, Antigua and Barbuda
- Region: Antigua and Barbuda

Muddy Bay is a post-Saladoid site in Saint Philip, Antigua and Barbuda. It is about 0.6 kilometres from the nearest major village, Willikies. It is located on Nonsuch Bay and was likely a fishing village inhabited around 1220 AD based on radiocarbon dating. It is noted for its well-preserved organic material. It is located on private land.
