= Urlings =

- Village
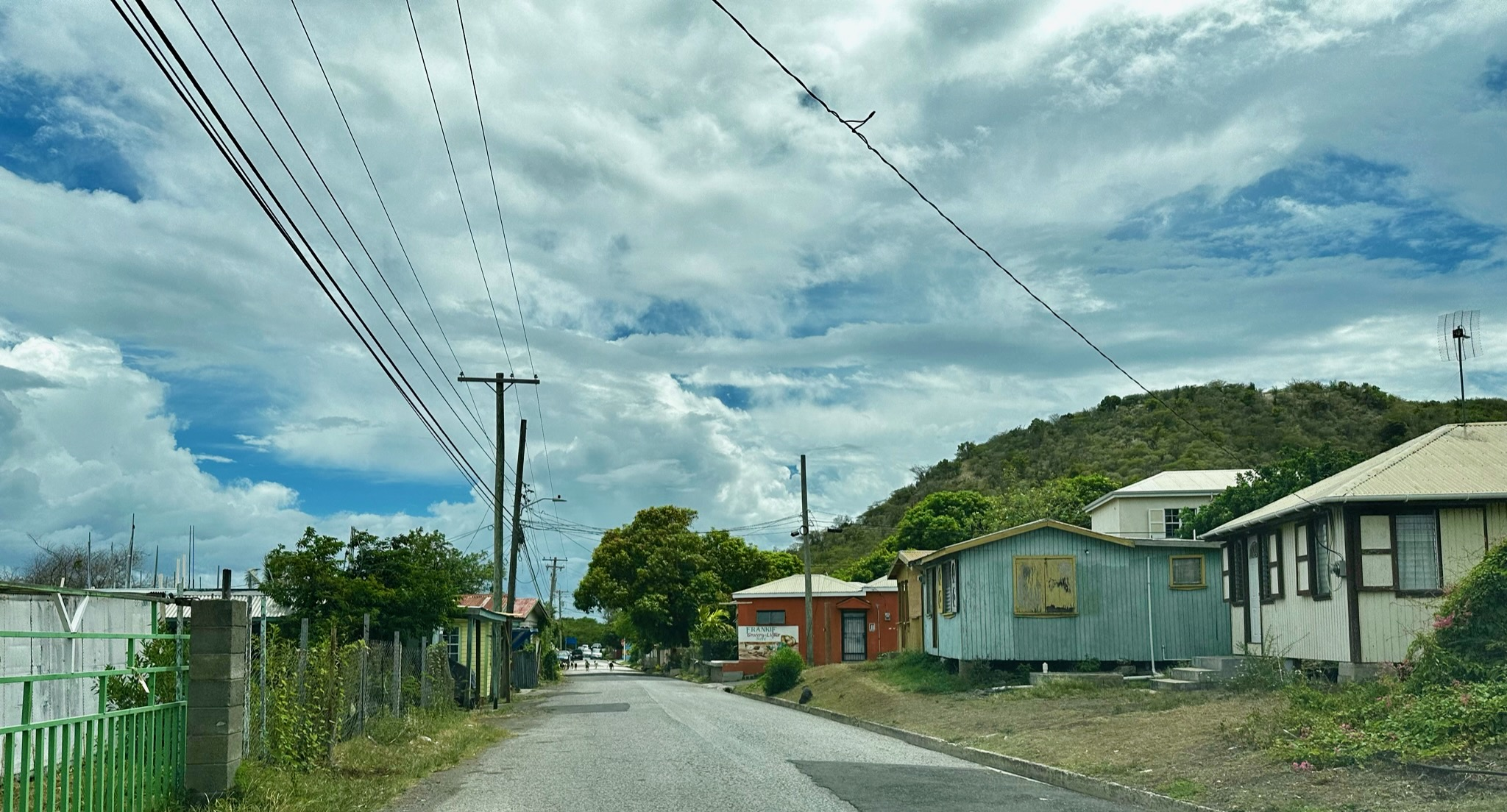
- Urlings in June 2023
- Interactive map of the Urlings main place
- Location in Antigua
- Coordinates: 17°1′29″N 61°52′22″W
- Country: Antigua and Barbuda
- Island: Antigua
- Civil parish: Saint Mary

Government
  - Member of Parliament: Dwayne George

Area
  - Total: 1.0 km^{2} (0.39 sq mi)
- Elevation: 50 m (160 ft)

Population
  - Total: 738
  - Density: 753/km^{2} (1,951/sq mi)
- Demonym: Urlingsian
- Time zone: UTC-4 (AST)
- Airport: V.C. Bird International Airport, in another town, 15.57 km
- Constituency: St. Mary's South
- Location: The village is 6.83 mi from the parliament building in Saint John's

Urlings (Note: Pronounced /ɚlɪŋs/) is a village in Saint Mary, and the twenty-sixth largest settlement in Antigua and Barbuda. Urlings is located in the southwest of Antigua and has a history dating to before 1856. Urlings started as a small coastal village with a little over 100 people in the 1800s to now being one of the country's more medium sized towns. Urlings is separated from the rest of Antigua by the Shekerley Mountains. Urlings is located between the communities of Johnsons Point and Old Road. Urlings has a seafood festival, a community association, a primary school, a playing field, a fisheries complex, and a cricket club that plays in the Village Parish League.

== Etymology ==
The name originates from the Urlins family, who were Antiguans in the late 17th century. Thomas Urlins held land in southwest Antigua in 1763.

== History ==
=== Pre-independence ===
The Urlings area was referred to as Glebe on earlier Antiguan maps.

On a census record from 1856, Urlings was spelled as Urlin's. There were 104 individuals living in Urlin's in 1856, 50 women and 54 men. There were 23 freeholds, 3 leaseholds, and 5 tenancies at will among the tenures. In the settlement, there were 31 occupied homes.

=== Post-independence and current events ===
Urlings, located in St. Mary's South, was a political battleground in the 2023 by-election. The date of the by-election, 24 October 2023, was announced by Gaston Browne at a political event in Urlings on the night of 30 September 2023.

== Geography ==
Urlings is located in the southwestern portion of Antigua and is overlooked by the Shekerley Mountains. Urlings borders the Morris Bay neighborhood of Old Road to the east, Boggy Peak ED to the north, and Johnsons Point to the west. To the south, Urlings borders the sea on the Cades Bay marine reserve. The Urlings (School) neighbourhood is the only neighbourhood in Urlings that is not landlocked. Urlings (School) has an area of 0.6 square kilometres, Urlings (St. Mary's Church) has an area of 0.3 square kilometres, Urlings (Central) has an area of 0.04 square kilometres, and Urlings (West) has an area of 0.4 square kilometres.

== Demographics ==
Population census
Year	Pop.	±% p.a.
1856	104	—
1970	924	+1.93%
1991	806	−0.65%
2001	913	+1.25%
2011	738	−2.11%
Source: 1856 Census, 2001 Census, 1991 Census, 1970 Census

St. Mary's Church (81300), Urlings Central (81400), Urlings West (81500), and Urlings School (81600) are the four enumeration districts used for the 2011 Census. 97.57% of the 738 people who lived in Urlings in 2011 were of African descent, 0.72% were white, 0.57% were black/white mixed, 0.72% were other mixed, and 0.43% did not know or did not state. 87.27% of the population was born in Antigua and Barbuda, 0.43% in Canada, 0.14% in other European countries, 1.57% in Dominica, 1.57% in Guyana, 2.58% in Jamaica, 0.43% in Montserrat, 0.14% in St. Kitts and Nevis, 0.29% in St. Lucia, 0.14% in St. Vincent and the Grenadines, 0.29% in Trinidad and Tobago, 0.43% in the United Kingdom, 3.43% in the United States, 0.72% in the United States Virgin Islands, and 0.57% not stated. Anglicans made up 48.13% of the population, Moravians 20.26%, Rastafarians 0.43%, and various other sects and denominations made up the remaining population.

== Economy ==
In Urlings in 2011, there were 31 business owners. 20.69% of business owners earned less than $1,000 EC per month, 10.34% between $1,000 and $1,999 EC, 31.03% between $2,000 and $2,999 EC, 27.59% between $3,000 and $4,999 EC, and 10.34% $5,000 EC or more per month. In Urlings, out of the 332 workers, 23.89% were paid government employees, 1.27% were paid workers for a statutory body, 57.32% were paid private workers, 1.27% were paid workers in private homes, 1.59% were self-employed with paid employees, 12.10% were self-employed without paid employees, 1.59% had another worker status, and 0.96% didn't know or didn't state. 60.00% of the 565 people whose employment status was inquired about had a job and were employed, 17.01% were retired, 7.29% had domestic responsibilities, and the remaining statuses ranged widely. 564 persons received money from abroad, with 90.45% receiving less than EC$100, 2.43% receiving $100 to $499, 2.81% receiving $500 to $999, 0.75% receiving $1,000 to $1,999, 1.87% receiving 2,000 to $4,999, and 1.69% receiving $5,000 to $99,999.

== Governance and politics ==
In Urlings, there is no local government. Polling district "C" includes the communities of Urlings, Cades Bay, and Brooks. The majority of voters in division "C" are citizens of Urlings. Division "C" in the general election of 2023 in Antigua had two voting places. A-J were covered by Station 1. K-W were covered by Station 2. In station 1, there were 355 electors, 149 voted for the UPP, and 131 voted for the ABLP. In station 2, 137 voted for the UPP, 99 voted for the ABLP, one voted for the DNA, and one ballot was rejected.

In the 2023 by-election, the Urlings mostly voted for the UPP.

== Infrastructure ==
=== Housing ===
In 2011, there were 272 households in Urlings. 1.84% of households used concrete as the main material of outer walls, 21.32% used concrete blocks, 46.32% used wood, 2.21% used wood and brick, 24.26% used wood and concrete, 3.31% used wood and galvanized, and 0.74% used other materials. 1.84% of households used concrete roofing, 65.81% used sheet metal, 2.21% used asphalt shingles, 29.78% used other shingles, and 0.37% used other roofing materials. 95.59% of dwellings were separate houses, 0.74% were part of a private house, 0.37% were flats, apartments, or condos, 1.47% were double houses or duplexes, 0.74% were business & dwellings, and 1.10% didn't know or didn't state. 9.93% of homes were owned with mortgage, 69.12% were owned outright, 0.74% were rent free, 15.07% were rented private, 0.74% were other, and 4.41% didn't know or didn't state. 1.47% had a leasehold land tenure, 72.06% were owned or freehold, 16.91% were rented, 1.47% were rented free, and 8.09% didn't know or didn't state. 99.63% of households used public garbage disposal.

In 2011, 5.51% of households used private, piped into dwelling as the main source of water, 5.88% used public standpipe, 69.85% used public piped into dwelling, 9.19% used private piped into dwelling, 8.46% used cistern/tank, and 1.10% used another source. 19.85% of households used bottled water as the main source of drinking water, 1.10% used public, piped into dwelling, 73.53% used cistern/tank, 4.41% used another source, and 1.10% dn/ns.

In 2011, 20.59% of households had a desktop computer. 7.72% of households had an air conditioner. 20.96% of households declared internet access.

=== Fisheries ===
The Fisheries Complex, a gift from Japan, was inaugurated in 2004 and has space for up to 14 small vessels.

== Neighbourhoods ==
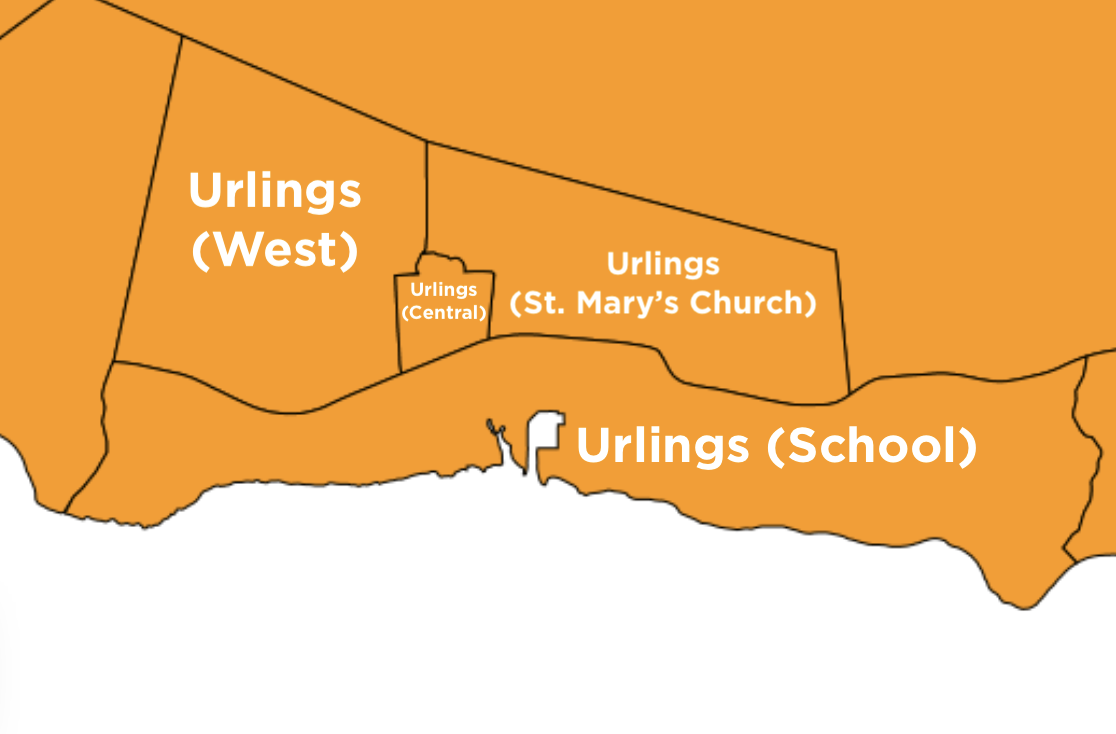
Map of the neighbourhoods in Urlings.

Urlings has four neighborhoods, Urlings (West), Urlings (Central), Urlings (St. Mary's Church), and Urlings (School).

=== Urlings (West) ===
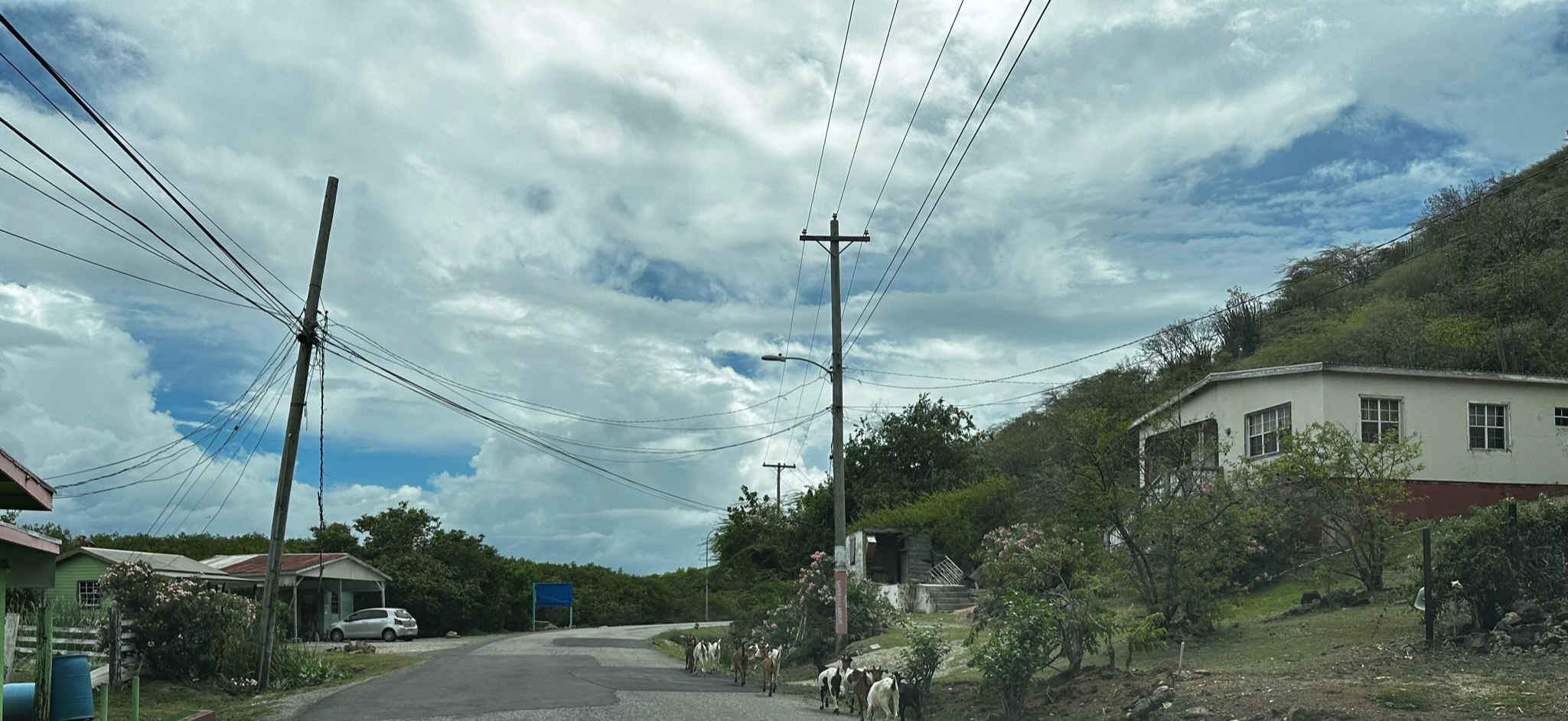
A road in Urlings in 2023

Urlings (West) has an area of 0.37 square kilometres. Urlings West has a population of 168 as of 2011. 52.23% of the population is Anglican, 18.47% is Moravian, and the remainder are other religions and denominations, mostly Christian. 97.48% of the population is African descendant, 0.63% are white, 1.26% are other mixed, and 0.63% didn't know or didn't state. 92.45% of the population was born in Antigua and Barbuda, 0.63% in Dominica, 1.89% in Guyana, 2.52% in Jamaica, 0.63% in Montserrat, and 1.89% in the United States. The neighbourhood had a living conditions index of 11.8.

=== Urlings (Central) ===
Urlings (Central) has an area of 0.038 square kilometres. There are 175 people living in Urlings Central. 83.13% of the population was born in Antigua and Barbuda, 2.41% in Dominica, 0.60% in Guyana, 0.60% in St. Kitts and Nevis, 1.20% in St. Lucia, 0.60% in St. Vincent and the Grenadines, 0.60% in Trinidad and Tobago, 0.60% in the United Kingdom, 7.83% in the United States, 1.81% in the United States Virgin Islands, and 0.60% not stated. 54.82% of the population is Anglican, 24.10% is Moravian, 7.83% is Wesleyan Holiness, 0.60% none/no religion, and the remainder of other denominations and faiths. 98.19% of the population is African descendant, 0.60% is white, 0.60% is other mixed, and 0.60% didn't know or didn't state. The neighbourhood had a living conditions index of 11.09.

=== Urlings (St. Mary's Church) ===
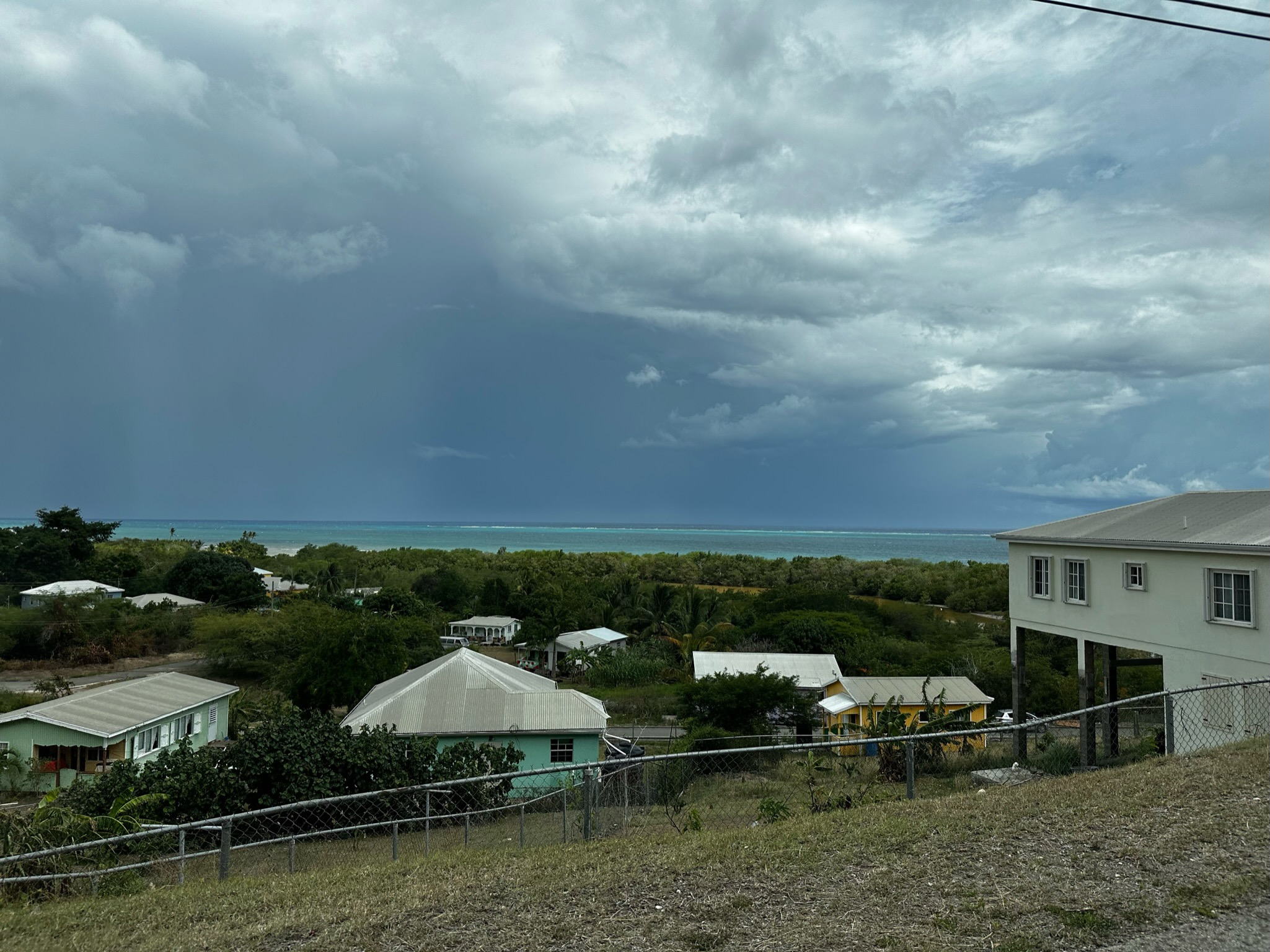
A costal area in Urlings

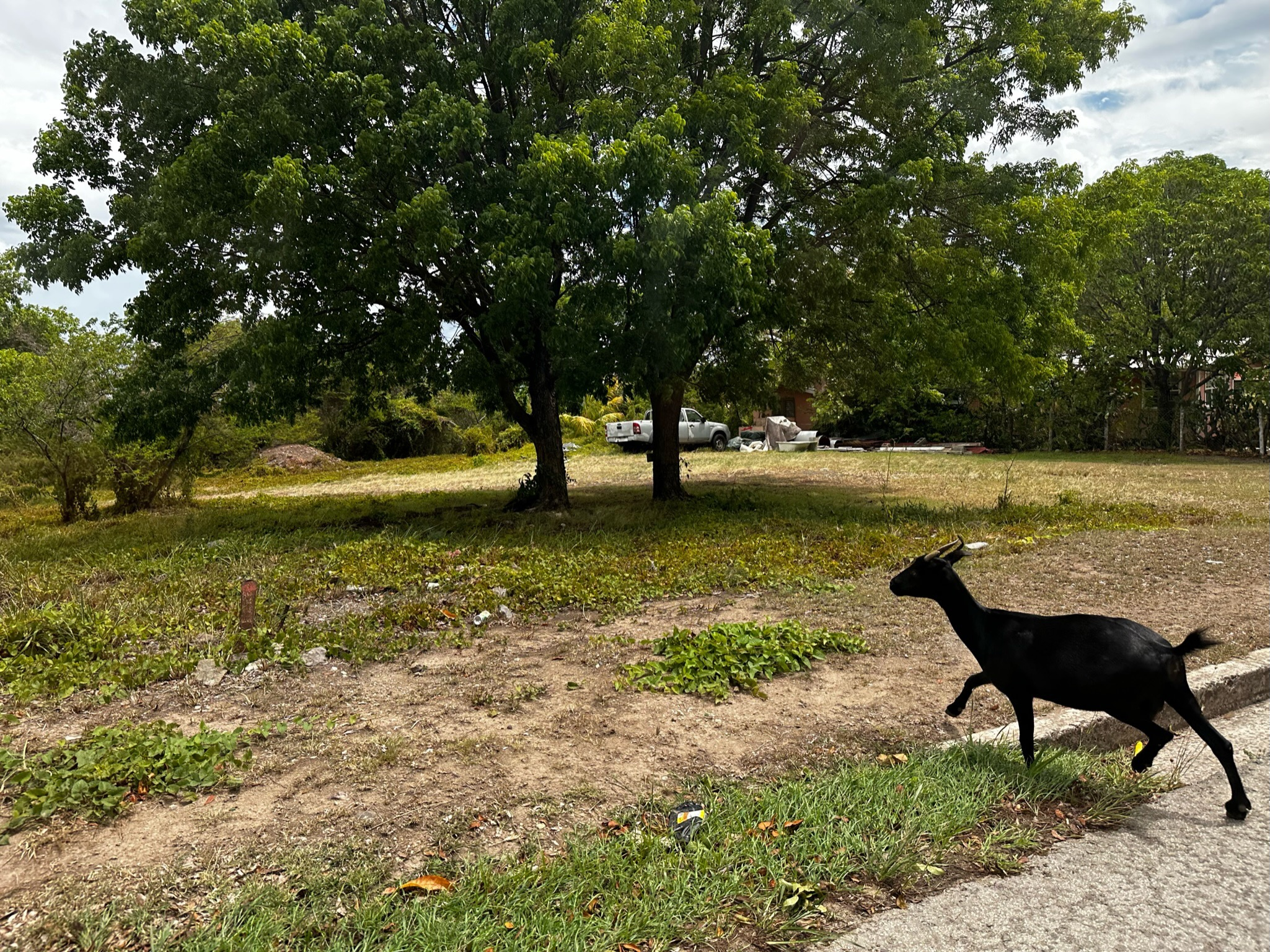
A lot in Urlings

Urlings (St. Mary's Church) has an area of 0.28 square kilometres. The St. Mary's Church population had a population of 165 in 2011. 94.87% of the population was African descendant, 1.28% was white, 2.56% was mixed black/white, and 1.28% was other mixed. 85.26% of the population was born in Antigua and Barbuda, 0.64% in Canada, 0.64% in other European countries, 0.64% in Dominica, 4.49% in Guyana, 1.28% in Jamaica, 0.64% in Trinidad and Tobago, 0.64% in the United Kingdom, 3.21% in the United States, 0.64% in the USVI, and 1.92% not stated. 50.64% of the population is Anglican, 20.51% is Moravian, 4.49% is none/no religion, 0.64% is Rastafarian, and the remainder of the population is various other denominations and faiths. The neighbourhood has a living conditions index of 12.34. The neighbourhood is low-income and has an income weight of 1.40, the neighbourhood was the only one in Urlings to have income weight data.

=== Urlings (School) ===
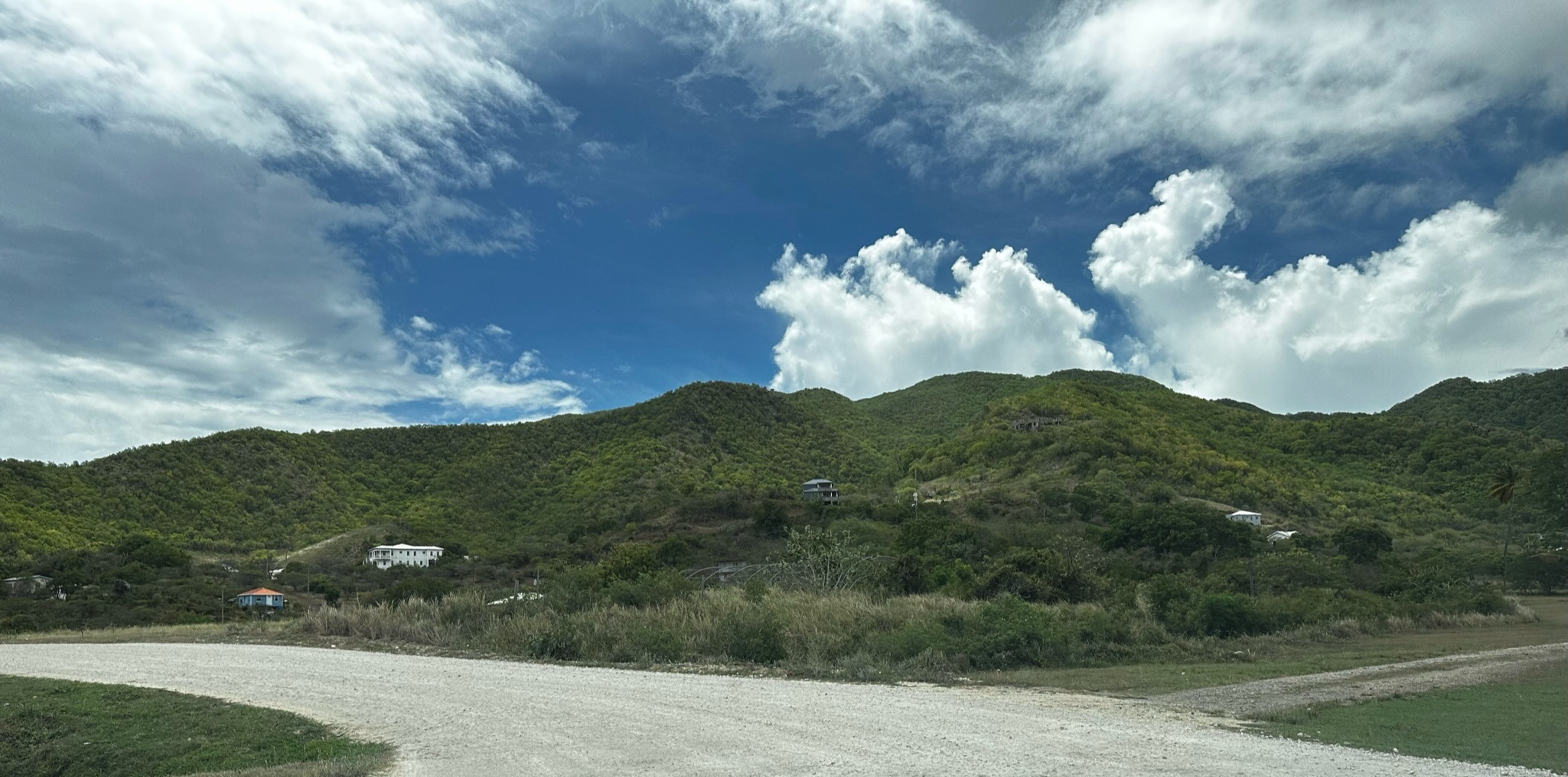
Entering Urlings from Old Road Village

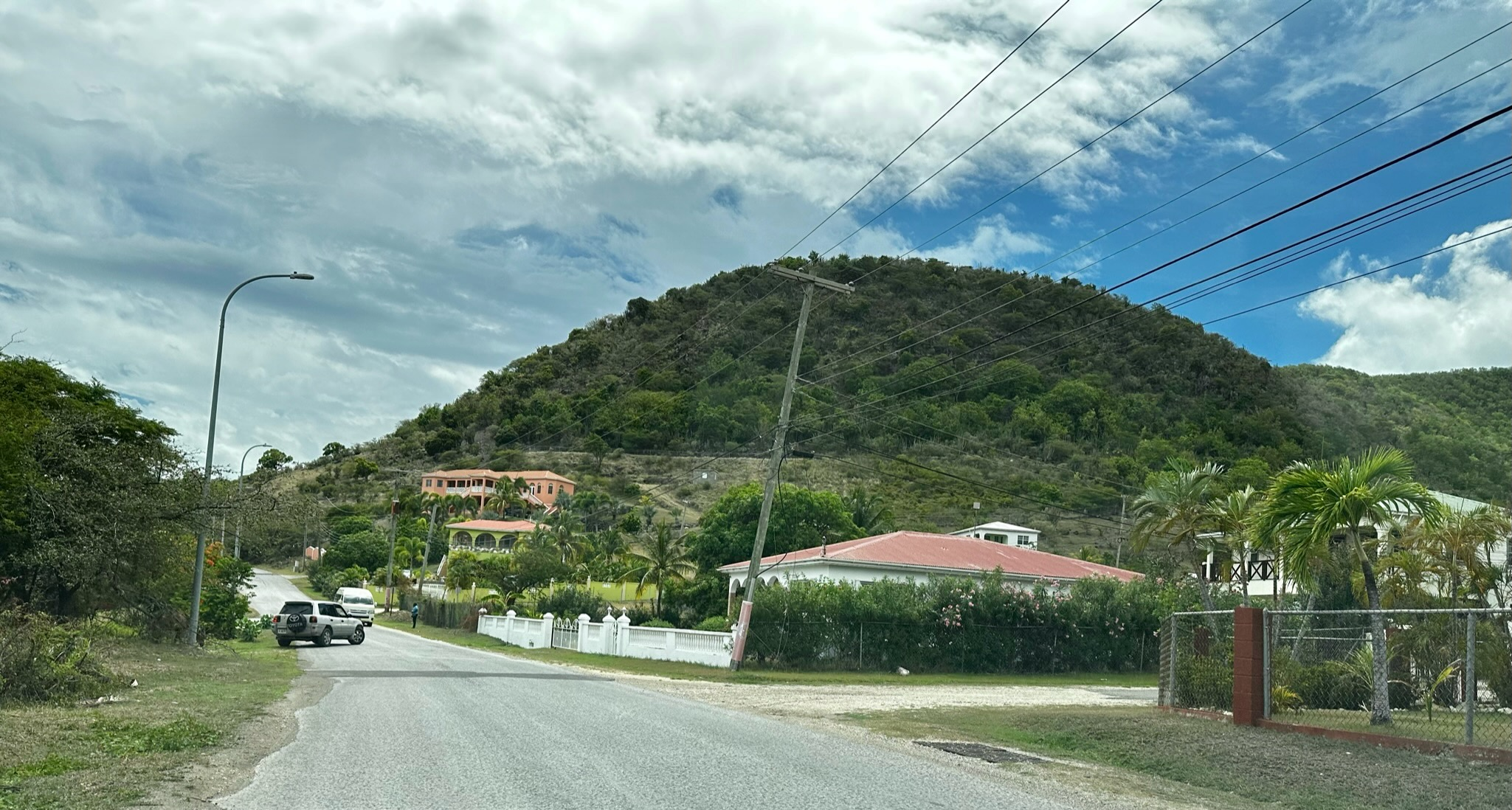
A road in Urlings

Urlings (School) has an area of 0.6 square kilometres. 230 people live in the Urlings (School) neighbourhood. 99.08% of the population is African descendant, 0.46% is white, and 0.46% didn't know or didn't state their ethnicity. Out of the 229 people asked, 38.25% of the population is Anglican, 18.43% are Moravian, 11.06% are Adventist, 5.99% have none/no religion, 0.92% are Rastafarian, and the remainder are various other denominations and faiths. 88.07% of the population was born in Antigua and Barbuda, 0.92% in Canada, 2.29% in Dominica, 5.50% in Jamaica, 0.92% in Montserrat, 0.46% in the United Kingdom, 1.38% in the United States, and 0.46% in the United States Virgin Islands. The neighbourhood has a living conditions index of 12.51.

== Climate ==
A tropical climate best describes the climatic conditions at Urlings. In Urlings, wintertime rainfall is significantly lower than summertime rainfall. Aw is the Köppen-Geiger classification for the climate. According to statistics data, the average temperature in the city of Urlings is 26.3 °C, or 79.3 °F. Every year, there is about 898 mm (35.4 inches) of rainfall.

Climate data for Urlings
Month	Jan	Feb	Mar	Apr	May	Jun	Jul	Aug	Sep	Oct	Nov	Dec	Year
Mean daily maximum °C (°F)	25.7 (78.3)	25.4 (77.7)	25.5 (77.9)	26.1 (79.0)	26.9 (80.4)	27.5 (81.5)	27.7 (81.9)	28 (82)	28.2 (82.8)	27.9 (82.2)	27.3 (81.1)	26.4 (79.5)	28.2 (82.8)
Daily mean °C (°F)	25.1 (77.2)	24.8 (76.6)	25 (77)	25.5 (77.9)	26.3 (79.3)	26.9 (80.4)	27.1 (80.8)	27.4 (81.3)	27.5 (81.5)	27.2 (81.0)	26.6 (79.9)	25.8 (78.4)	26.3 (79.3)
Average precipitation mm (inches)	41 (1.6)	30 (1.2)	30 (1.2)	43 (1.7)	70 (2.8)	58 (2.3)	81 (3.2)	102 (4.0)	130 (5.1)	140 (5.5)	105 (4.1)	68 (2.7)	898 (35.4)
Average rainy days	10	8	8	9	11	11	14	15	15	15	14	12	142
Mean monthly sunshine hours	8.5	8.6	9.0	9.5	9.7	9.6	9.5	9.3	9.1	8.6	8.5	8.3	108.2

Beach climate data for Urlings
Month	Jan	Feb	Mar	Apr	May	Jun	Jul	Aug	Sep	Oct	Nov	Dec	Year
Average sea temperature °C (°F)	(79.9)	(79.2)	(79.2)	(80.2)	(81.5)	(82.4)	(82.8)	(83.8)	(84.4)	(84.2)	(82.9)	(82.4)	

== See also ==
- Andy Roberts, born in Urlings
- Digital television transition
