= Twenty Hill =

- Interactive map of Twenty Hill
- Coordinates: 17°6′8″N 61°46′11″W
- Country: Antigua and Barbuda
- Parish: Saint Peter

Area
  - Total: 0.35 km^{2} (0.14 sq mi)

Twenty Hill is a historic site and sparsely populated area in southern Parham.

Twenty Hill, which is located in Parham, and Jolly Beach, which is located in Jolly Bay, are the two locations in Antigua that hold the distinction of being the earliest and most significant sites of human occupation (c. 1775 BC). Near the Martello Tower on the island of Barbuda is a site known as River, which has a date of 1875 BC. Up until about 100 BC, Amerindian tribes from the Archaic period lived in Antigua and Barbuda. However, the next period didn't begin until some time before this, so there is some overlap between the Archaic and the following period.

In Twenty Hill, there is a goat farm that is known for its artisan soaps made from goat's milk. The demographics of the area are similar to the rest of the country. While census data has not been collected for Twenty Hill in particular, the enumeration district it is located in had a mostly Afrodescendant population with a high population of Adventists and Anglicans and a moderately large immigrant population. Twenty Hill was located in the southern portion of the enumeration district 51001 for the 2011 census.
