= Ceramic period in Antigua and Barbuda =

Historical period in Antigua and Barbuda

The Ceramic period in pre-Columbian Antigua and Barbuda began with the arrival of the Arawak (Taíno) around 500 BC until the start of the Post-Saladoid period around 700 AD. These people likely came from the Orinoco River region and probably coexisted with the Archaic people for some time. The Arawak arrived by canoe and established the first permanent villages on the islands. These people made Saladoid pottery and were horticultural, their staple crop being cassava. The Arawak worshipped three gods and the villages were administered by chiefs or elders. They also engaged in trade, jadeite on the island likely originating from Guatemala.

The Arawak were a seafaring people, with some villages being entirely dedicated to the manufacture of boats, especially along Falmouth Harbour. The people did not wear much clothing other than the occasional apron. They lived in huts with roofs as tall as 25 feet. The villages would have shamans who were believed to communicate with the three gods: Yocahu, Atabeyra, and Opiyel Wa'obiran. Spirits were believed to live in "zemies", religious icons of varying composition.

Other than cassava, important crops farmed by the Arawak included sweet potatoes, maize, cotton, tobacco, nuts, medicinal plants, fruits, and various vegetables. Protein came from birds, seafood, and other small animals.
