= List of beaches of Antigua and Barbuda =

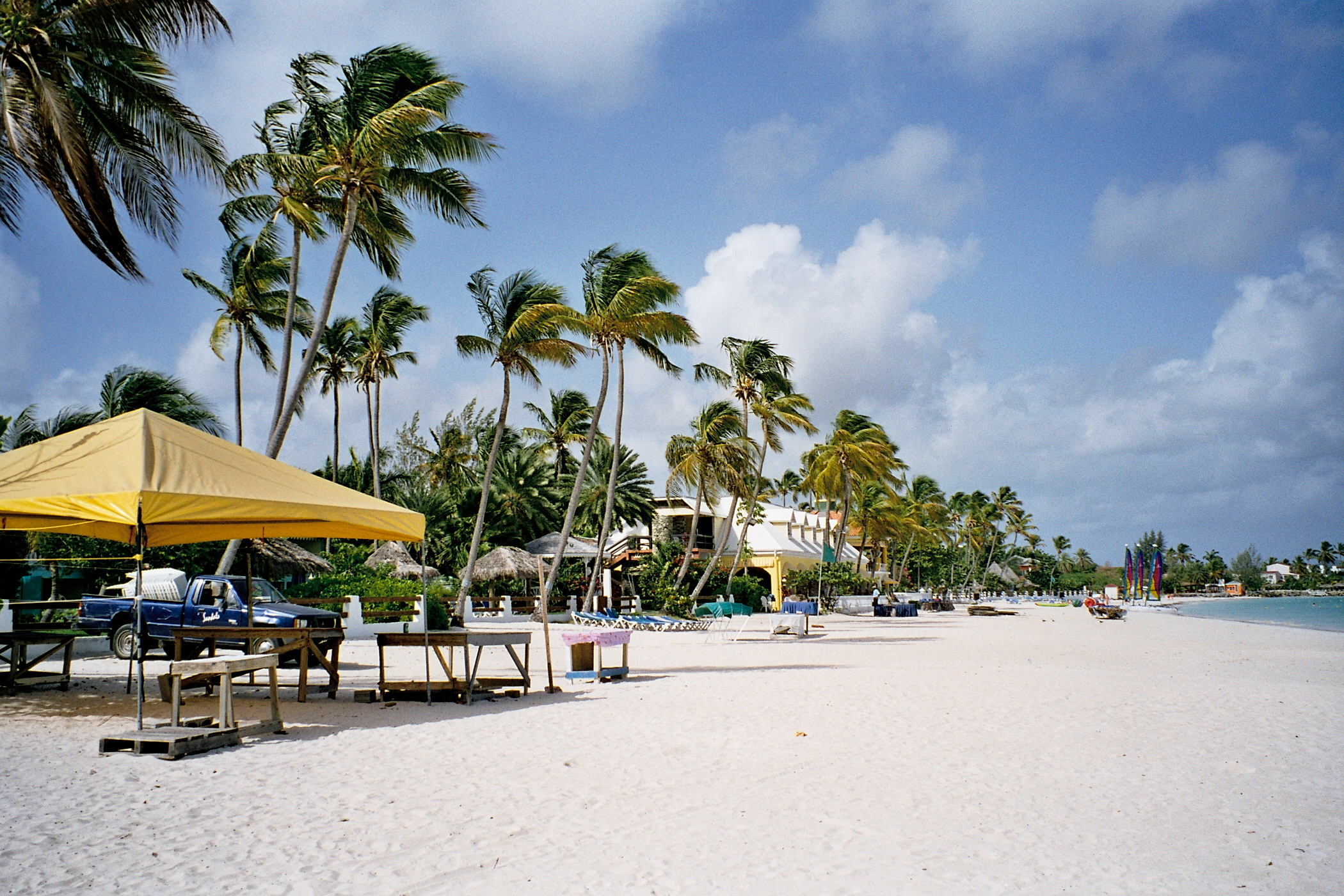
Antigua beach view

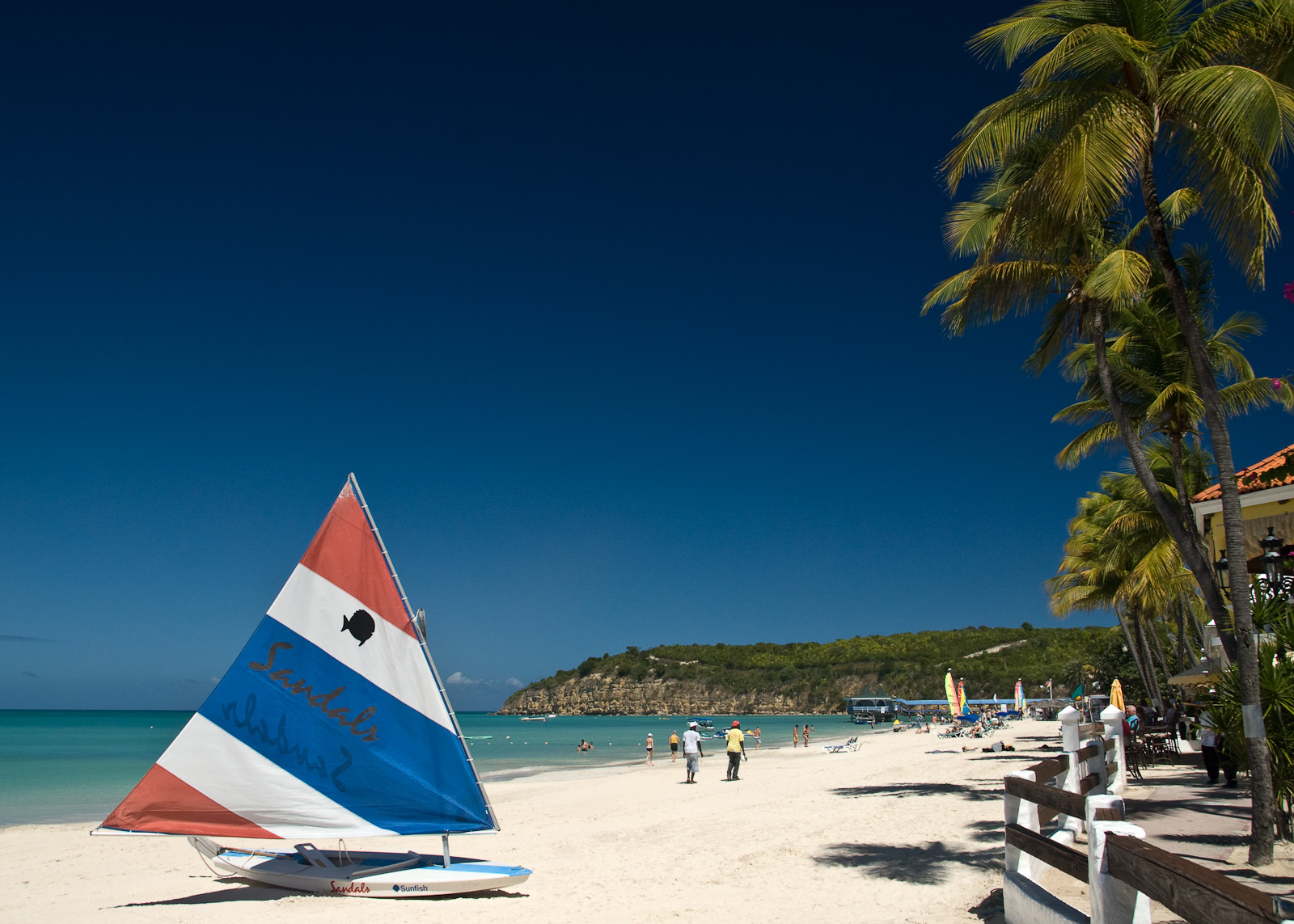
Runaway Beach on Dickenson Bay

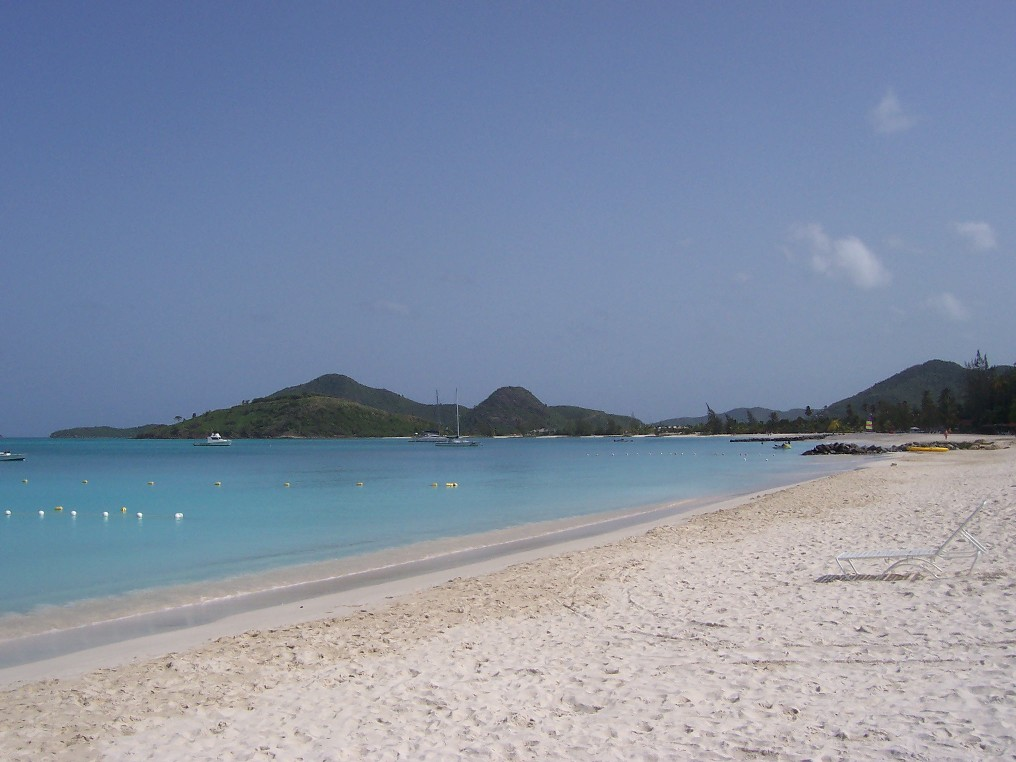
Jolly beach at Jolly Harbour

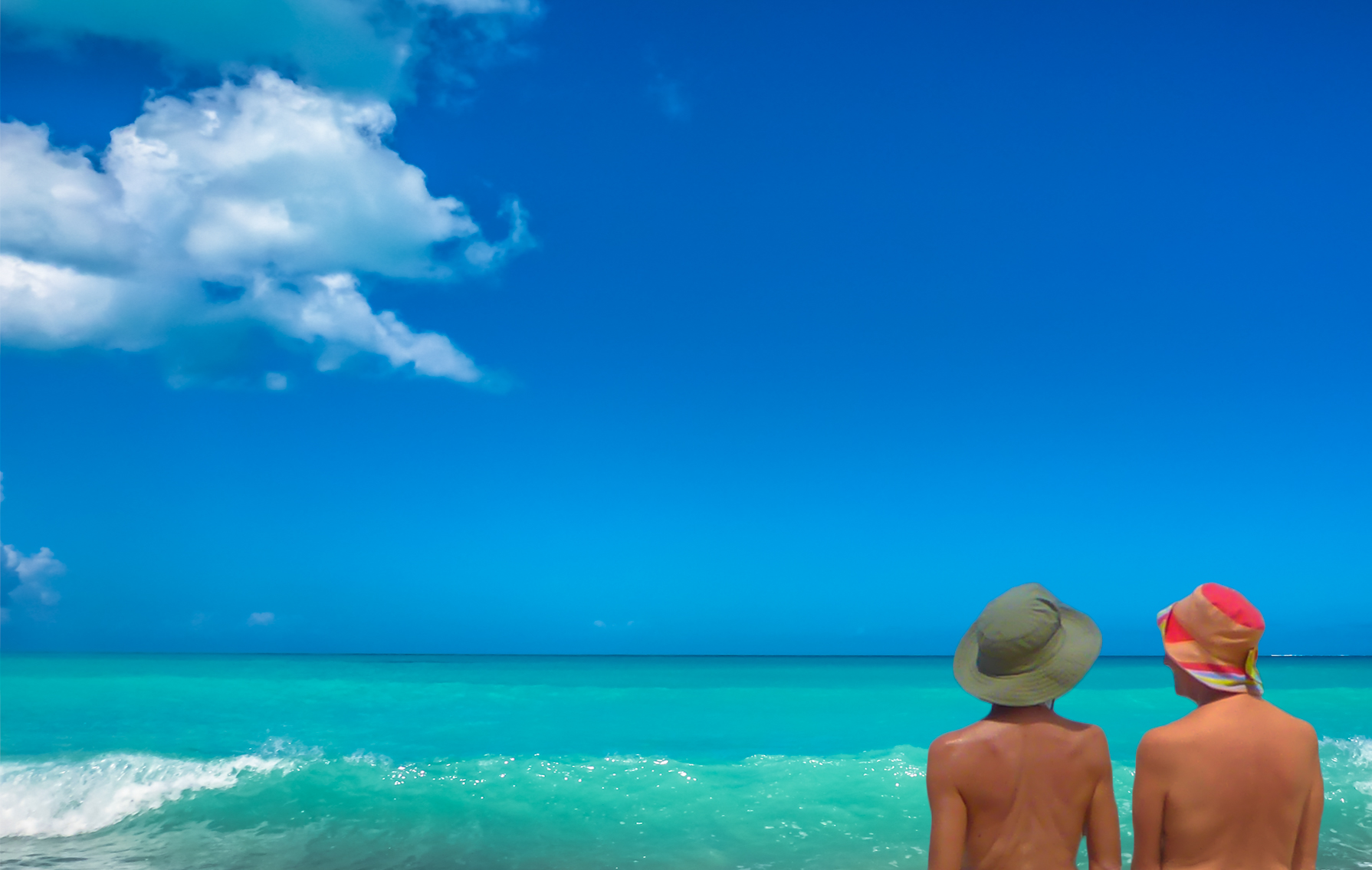
Eden Beach

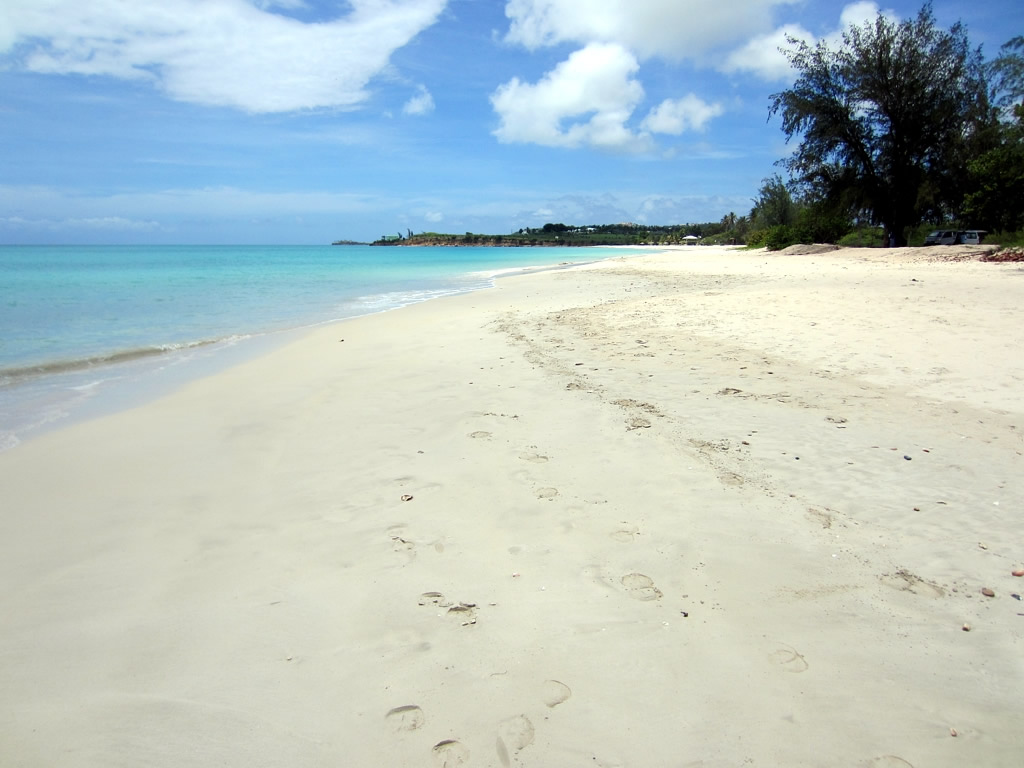
Fort James Beach, Fort Bay

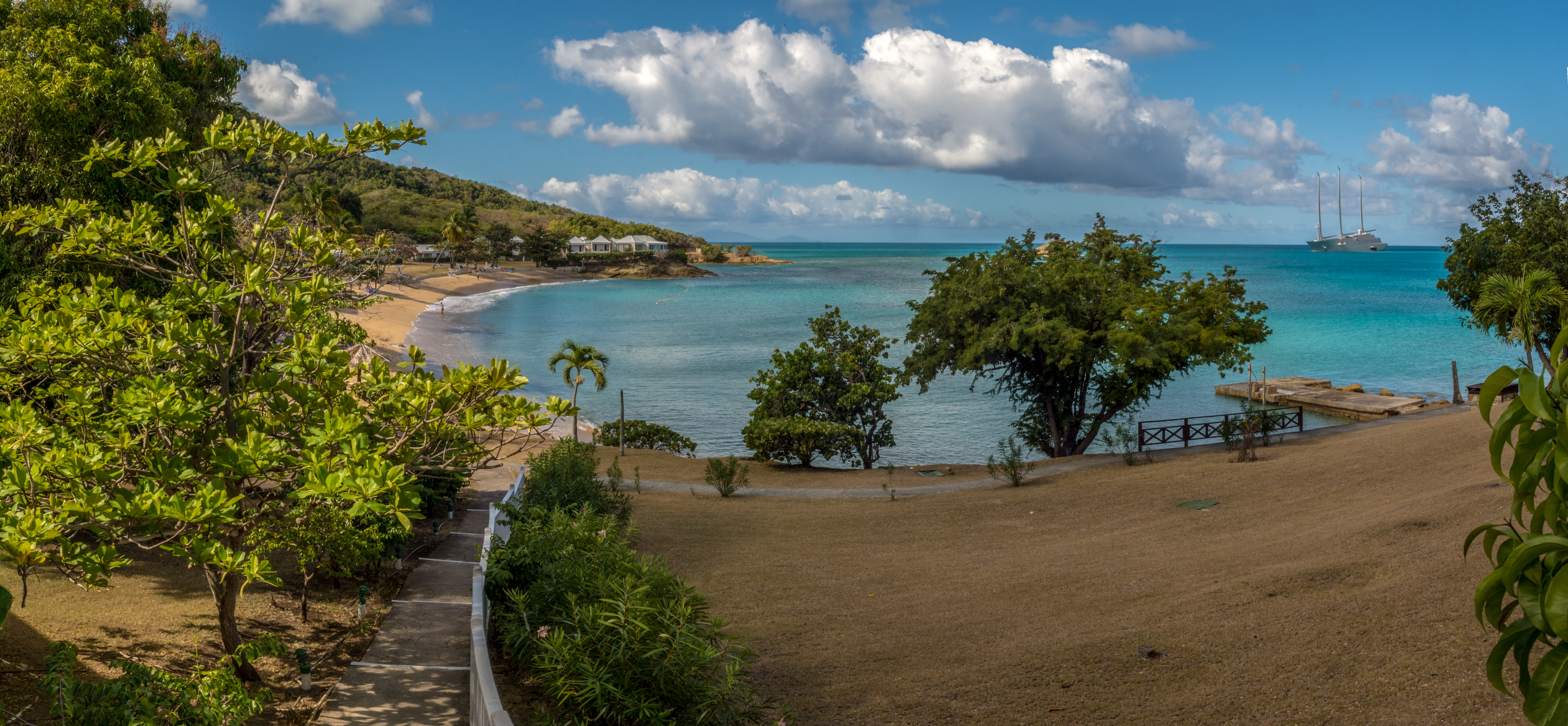
Sea Grapes Beach, Hawksbill Bay

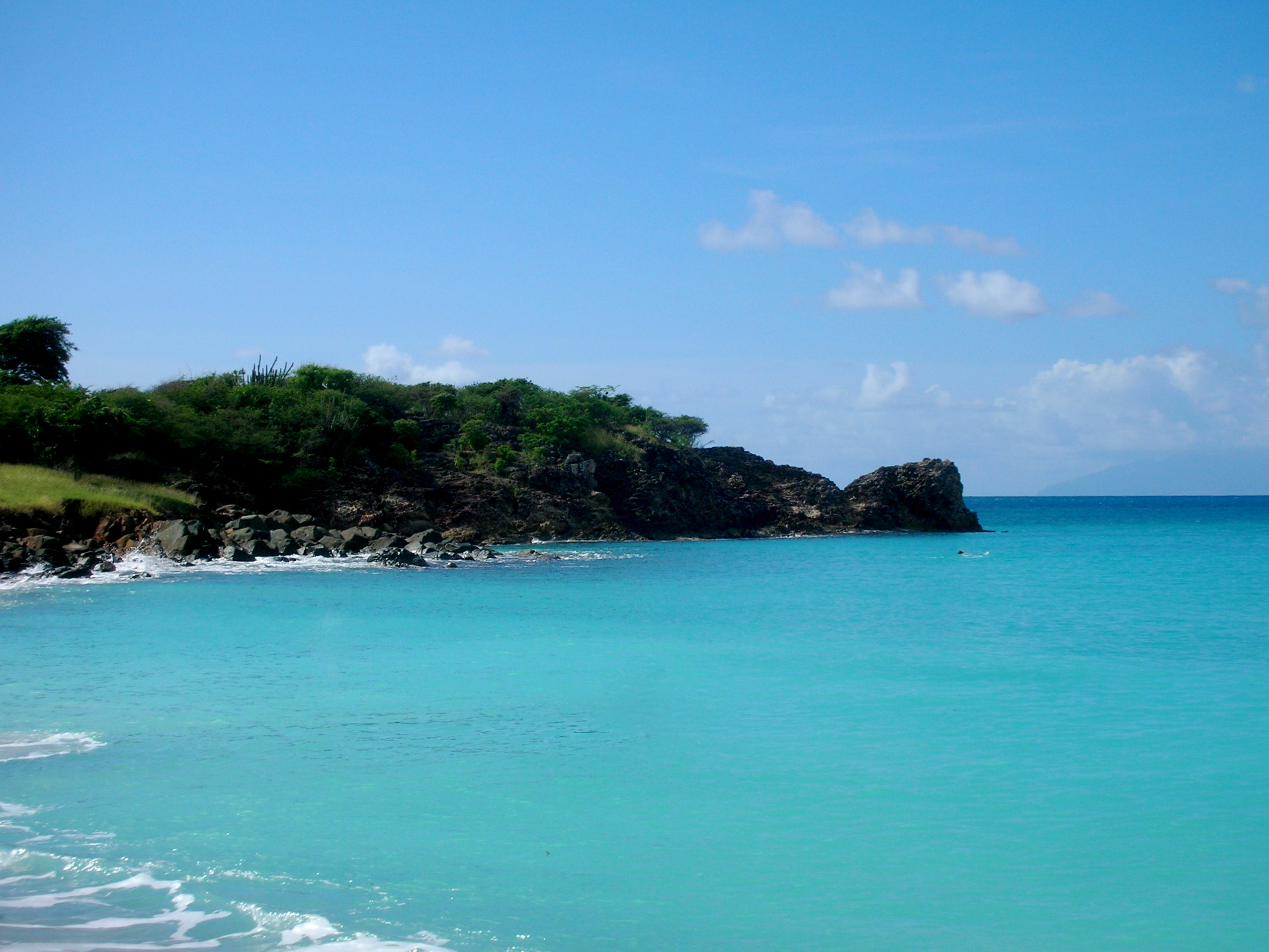
Turner Beach

This is a list of beaches of Antigua and Barbuda. Antigua has 365 beaches.

== Overview ==
The country consists of the islands of Antigua and Barbuda (and the remote uninhabited island of Redonda), in the central section of the island chain of the West Indies, as one of the northernmost of the Leeward Islands of the Lesser Antilles.

Both islands are of volcanic origin but, compared to other Antilles islands, relatively old and therefore lack a pronounced central mountain range. They are surrounded by the shallow sea of the submarine shelf and mature coral reefs, which protect them from erosion and provide the beaches with the famous pure white sand, which is slightly pink on Barbuda.

The beaches of the island form the economic basis of the small state, although tourism in Antigua and Barbuda is not as pronounced as on other Caribbean islands. Development only began in the 1980s. Under Lester Bird, the development of tourism infrastructure was intensified, partly with high land consumption, resulting in the sacrifice of some of the most important mangrove swamps on Antigua. At times, there was also illegal sand mining – in the mid-1990s, Barbuda was the main source of building sand in the eastern Caribbean. Due to the absence of mountains, both islands lack orographic clouds and receive little orographic rainfall, which has affected the important coastal freshwater reserves. As a result, an oppositional ecological protest movement emerged in the 1990s, leading to some violent protests against new construction projects. Nevertheless, there are still undeveloped beaches on both islands; in 1988, eight beaches were declared undevelopable by Parliament (Undeveloped Beaches, beach protection areas). Under the influence of rising sea levels due to global warming as well as environmental reasons, more emphasis is now placed on beach protection. The trigger for this change in thinking was Hurricane Luis in September 1995, which caused severe coastal damage. There is permanent land loss at some beaches. Since the mid-2000s, there has been some expansion, but it is more oriented towards quality tourism integrated into the regional structure (Eco-tourism).

Beaches are considered public property (state land) and are freely accessible, with occasional exceptions for private ownership. Going topless in public is considered indecent.

== List ==
- Big Ffryes Beach
- Buccaneer Cove Beach
- Carlisle Bay Beach
- Coco Point Beach, Barbuda, 17°32′59″N 61°45′58″W
- Coral Bay Beach
- Darkwood Beach, SW Antigua
- Deep Bay Beach, Southeast Antigua
- Dickinson Bay Beach, Northwest Antigua
- Doigs Beach, South Antigua
- Devil's Bridge beach, Devil's Bridge National Park, Saint Philip, Antigua and Barbuda, 17°06′02″N 61°40′42″W
- Eden beach (nude beach), Hawksbill Bay, near Five Islands, Antigua, 17°06′36″N 61°54′04″W
- 12 beaches, Five Islands, Antigua
- Fort James Beach, Fort Bay, Northwest Antigua
- Galleon Beach, Freeman's Bay, Antigua, 17°00′41″N 61°45′37″W
- Galley Bay beach, Galley Bay, Antigua, 17°07′23″N 61°53′27″W
- Half Moon Bay, SE coast, Half Moon National Park, Antigua
- Hermitage Bay Beach, near Jolly Harbour
- Jabberwock Beach, Northeast Antigua
- Johnson's Point, SW Antigua
- Jolly Beach, Jolly Harbour, Saint Mary, Antigua 17°04′10″N 61°53′23″W
- Little Ffryes Beach (Coco Beach), Antigua
- Long Bay beach, East Antigua
- Pigeon Point beach, Barbuda, 17°38′40″N 61°44′49″W
- Pink sand beach, Barbuda, 17°35′32″N 61°49′26″W
- Rendezvous Bay, South Antigua
- Runaway Beach, Dickenson Bay, Runaway Bay, Antigua17°08′45″N 61°51′25″W
- Sea Grapes Beach, Hawksbill Bay, Antigua
- Turner Beach, Antigua
- Valley Church Beach

== See also ==
- List of beaches
