= Tourism in Antigua and Barbuda =

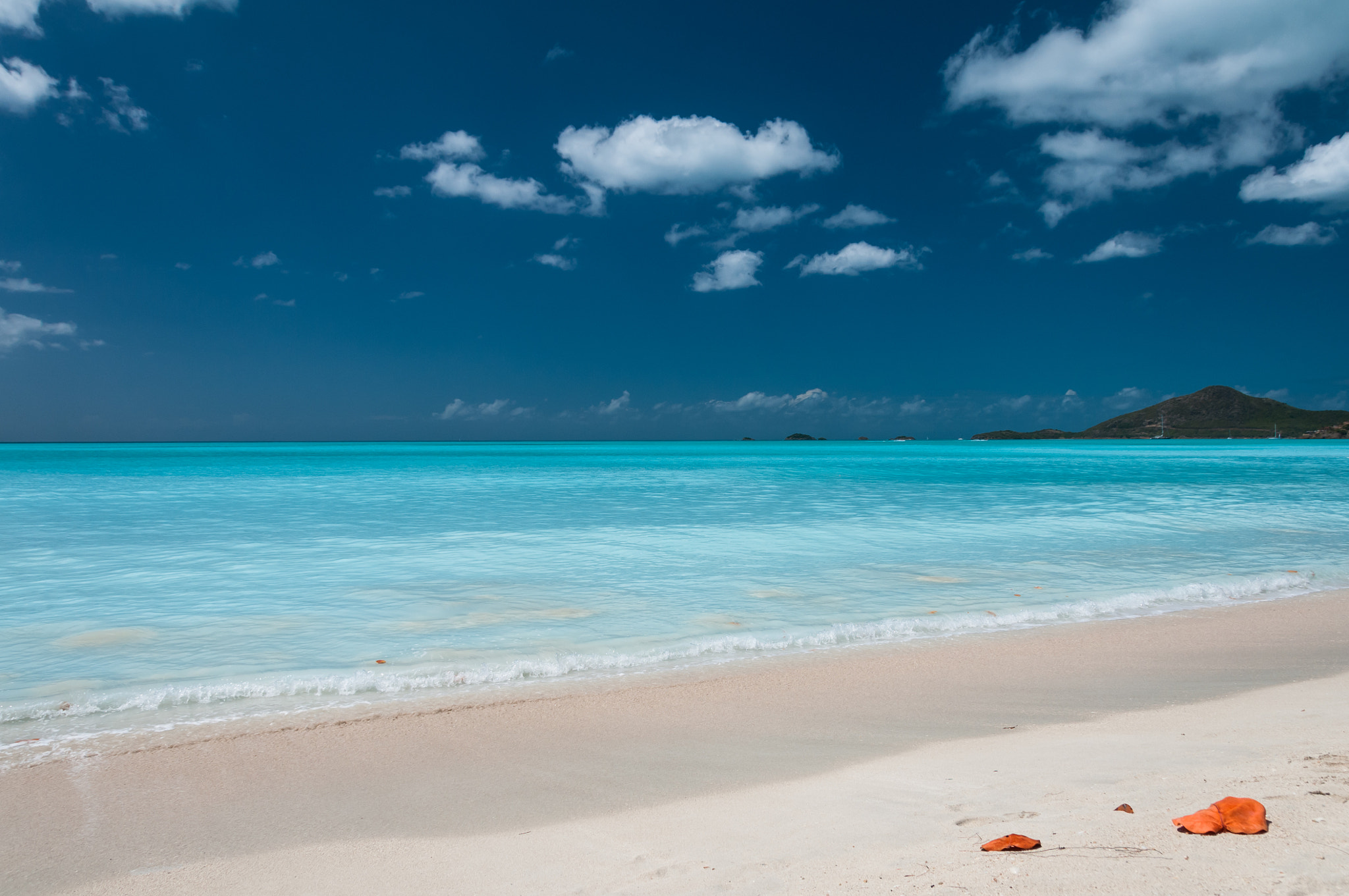
Valley Church Beach in Ffryes, Saint Mary

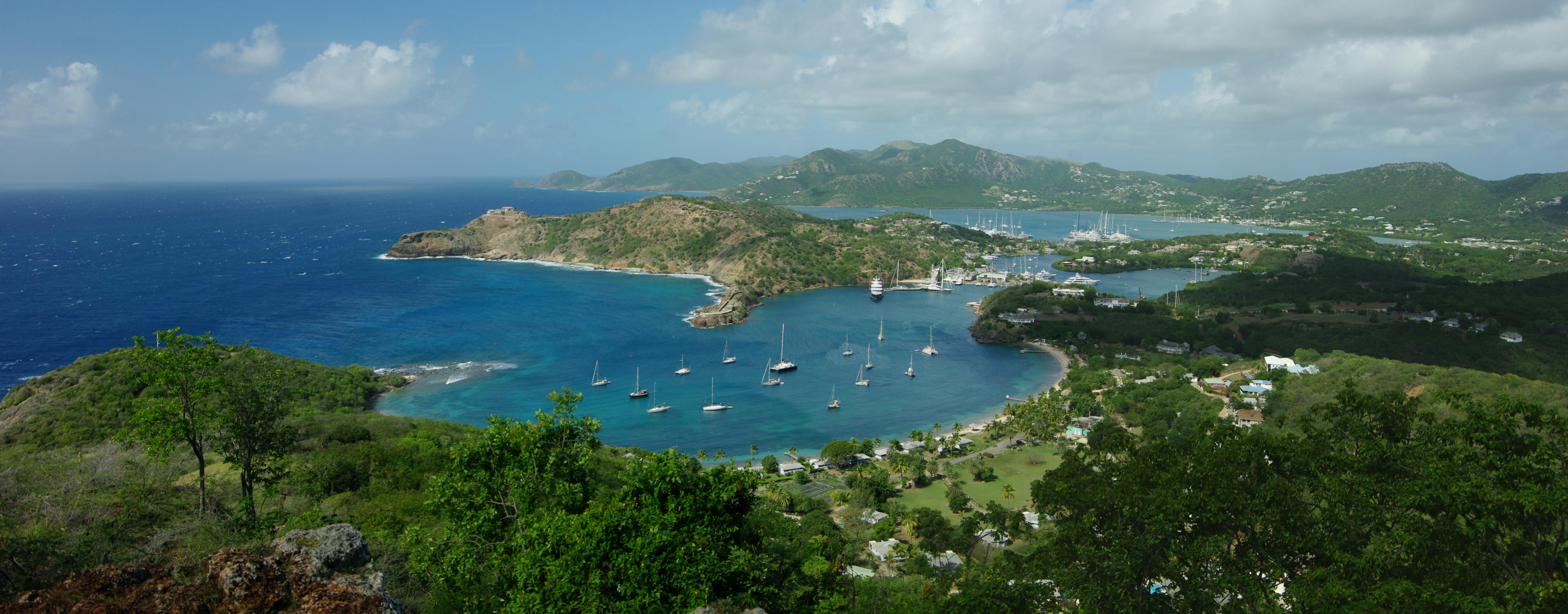
English Harbour from Shirley Heights

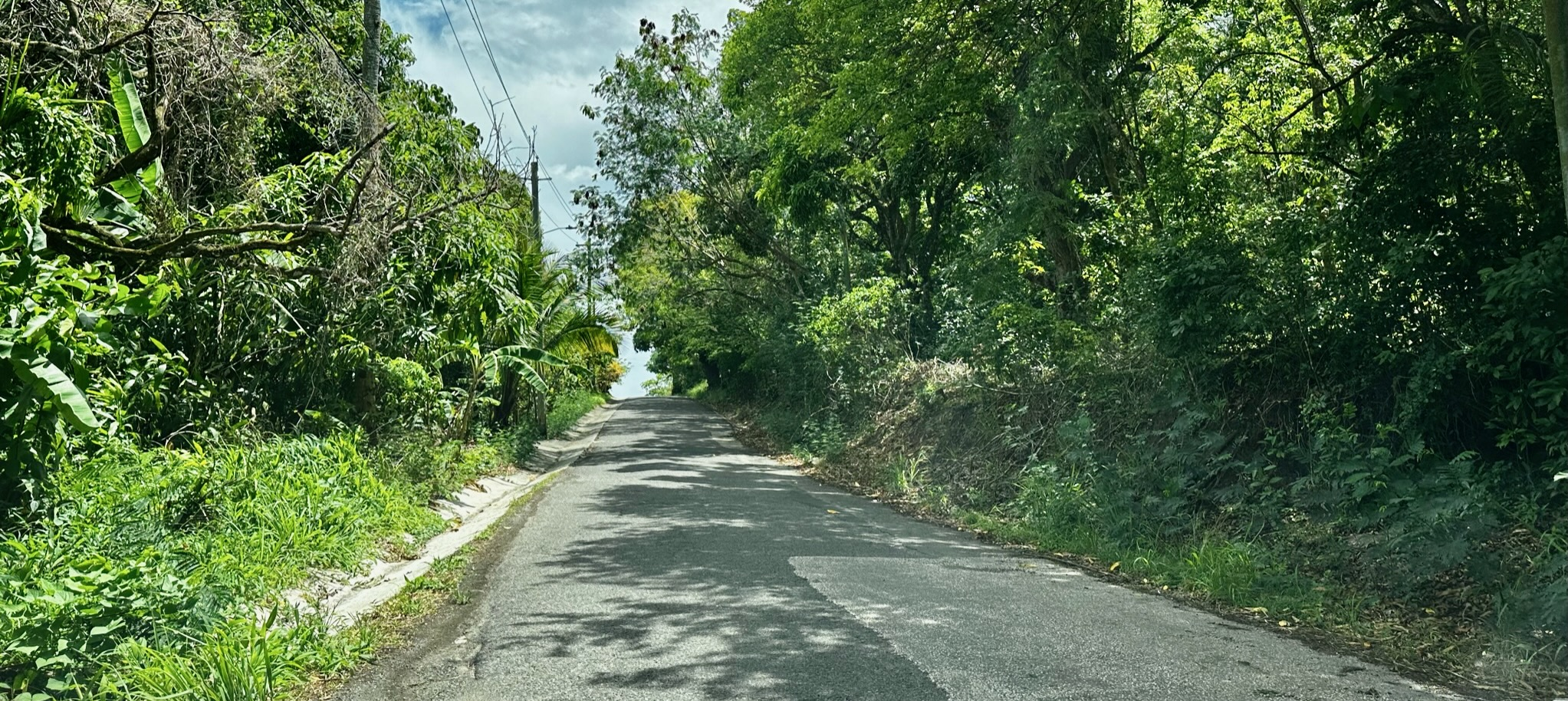
Fig Tree Drive in the Wallings Forest Reserve

Tourism is the primary industry in Antigua and Barbuda. It is overseen by the Antigua and Barbuda Tourism Authority. In 2024, over 70% of the country's population was employed in the industry, and revenues from tourism contributed to more than two-thirds of the gross domestic product. The country has two international airports– the V. C. Bird International Airport in Antigua and the Burton–Nibbs International Airport in Barbuda, as well as several seaports of entry including the main one at St. John's Harbour. The country offers several categories of attractions, including its beaches, resorts, historic sites, the rainforests of the Shekerley Mountains, and many more. While nearly all tourism in the country originates from abroad, domestic tourism, usually marketed as 'staycations', exists as well.

Antigua and Barbuda received 1.2 million tourists in 2024, an increase of 17 percent from 2023. Most tourists come from western markets such as Europe, the United States, and Canada. The country is also seeing significant growth in visitors from other islands– currently Trinidad and Tobago is the largest source market for Caribbean visitors. The country also received nearly 500 cruise calls in 2025. When a cruise docks at the Antigua Cruise Port, almost 20,000 people may come to shore, nearly a fifth of the country's resident population. Antigua and Barbuda also received 330,281 overnight visitors in 2024, of which 173,183 were from the United States. The vast majority of tourists are day-trippers arriving by sea. With such a high number of tourists at any given time compared to the population, visitor expenditures contribute a significant amount to the economy, with visitors spending almost US$900 million in 2024.

Antigua is best known for its 365 beaches. All beaches in the country are open to the public and this rule is regularly enforced. Virtually all resorts in the country are located on the coastline. Daytrippers are also known to visit these beaches. The most famous beaches in Antigua include Runaway Beach, Dickenson Bay, Jolly Beach, Darkwood Beach, and Half Moon Bay. Tourists are also shuttled to the many offshore islands that are home to small accommodations and secluded beaches. Antigua is also home to a UNESCO World Heritage Site, the Antigua Naval Dockyard and Related Archaeological Sites, centred around Nelson's Dockyard, a historic military base in English Harbour. Ecotourism also exists in Antigua, primarily in the rainforested Shekerley Mountains which contain officially protected forests such as Wallings, hiking tours, and jungle ziplines. Barbuda is considered to be the most unspolit main island in the Caribbean, with a very low population density. Barbuda caters to the luxury tourism market and is known for its pink sand beaches, rare birds, and remoteness. Most visitors to Barbuda are daytrippers from Antigua and arrive by sea at The River.

Several cities in Antigua and Barbuda attract the majority of tourists. These include St. John's, which has the Heritage Quay and Redcliffe Quay shopping malls, Bolans which contains the Jolly Harbour development, English Harbour with its World Heritage Site, and McKinnon's with its various coastal developments.
