= Ffryes =

Ffryes may refer to:

- Ffryes, Saint Mary, Antigua and Barbuda
- St. Philip's, Antigua and Barbuda, also known as Ffryes
- Ffryes Pasture
- Ffryes Estate, Saint Philip
- Ffryes Beach
- Little Ffryes Beach
