= Pillars of Hercules (disambiguation) =

The Pillars of Hercules are the promontories that flank the entrance to the Strait of Gibraltar.

Pillars of Hercules may also refer to:

- Pillars of Hercules (Antigua), a landform in Antigua
- The Pillars of Hercules (book)
- Pillars of Hercules, Soho, a London pub
