= Bertish =

Bertish is a surname. Notable people with the surname include:

- Chris Bertish (born 1974), South-African-born surfer, adventurer, and motivational speaker
- Suzanne Bertish (born 1951), English actress
