= McKinnon's Pond =

- The pond in 2023

- Location within Antigua and Barbuda
- Location: Antigua and Barbuda
- Coordinates: 17.146°N 61.852°W
- Type: lake

McKinnon's Pond is located just north of St. John's, Antigua and Barbuda, the largest city in the country. Runaway Beach is just west of it, and it is fed by a small stream leading from St. John's.

McKinnon's Pond is located in the village of McKinnon's.
