= Jolly Harbour =

Jolly Harbour Jaali Aaba
- Neighbourhood
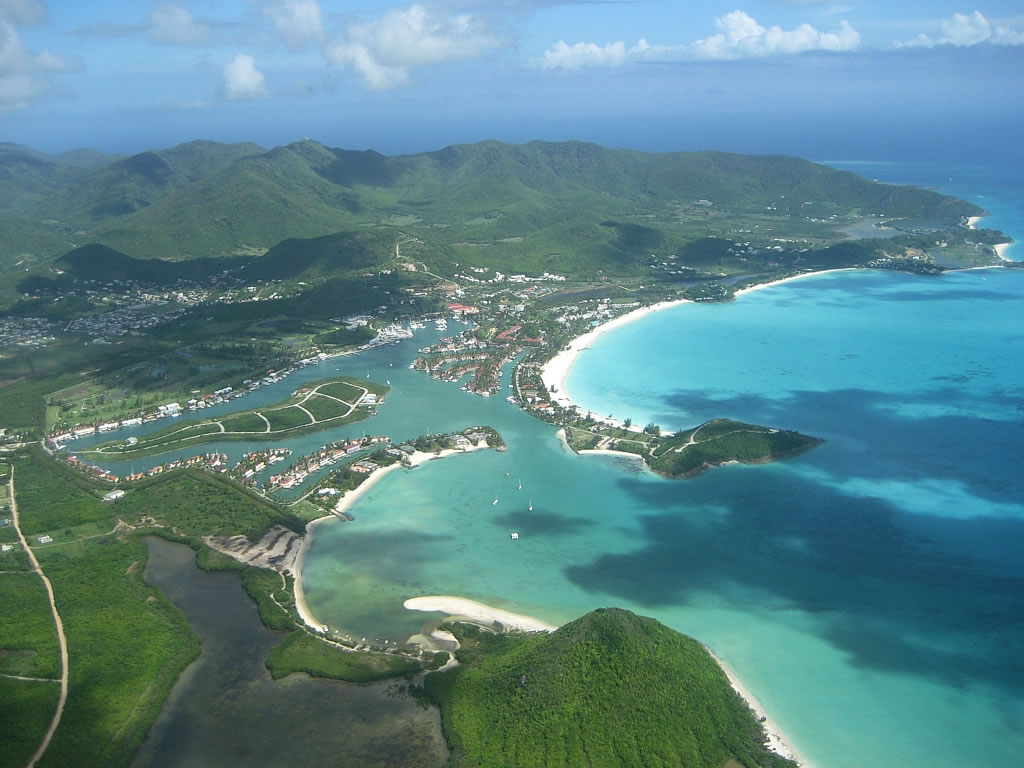
- Aerial view of Jolly Harbour

- Location within Antigua
- Coordinates: 17°03′58″N 61°53′14″W
- Country: Antigua and Barbuda
- Island: Antigua
- Parish: Saint Mary
- Village: Bolans

Government
  - MP: Dwayne George

Area
  - Total: 3.84 km^{2} (1.48 sq mi)

Population (2011)
  - Total: 403
- Time zone: UTC-4 (AST)

Jolly Harbour (South Antiguan Creole: Jaali Aaba) is a neighbourhood of Bolans, Saint Mary, Antigua and Barbuda. It began as a commercial development in the 1980s and has since grown to hold one of the largest expatriate populations on the island. The area has a permanent population of 403 as of 2011 and contains a gated community with various amenities such as restaurants, shopping centres, supermarkets, parks, and beaches. It is also an important area for tourism with several villas and notable resorts.

The main beach in the area is Jolly Beach on Lignum Vitae Bay. This area is the site of some of the oldest human habitation on the island dating back to the Archaic period. For most of its history it was a series of swamps and mangroves, being an important habitat for bird and marine life, as well as a location for subsistence fishing by local residents. Today, it is a major commercial centre and the sole port of entry on Antigua's southwest coast.

== Geography ==
The town is located on the southwest coast of the island in Saint Mary Parish, close to Bolans and south of Five Island Harbour. The area is overlooked by the Shekerley Mountains which contain the island's only rainforest. Jolly Harbour is a district of the Bolans community. The neighbourhood officially covers an area of 3.84 square kilometres, including the enumeration districts of North Finger, South Finger, and Jolly Beach. Most residential development is located on the two peninsulas, and there is also a residential island in the middle of the harbour: Harbour Island. A 2010 study found that most land in the area is used for resorts, although there is also a small patch of tropical forest at the very end of the south finger peninsula. There is also a large patch of 'recreational' land in the east built on top of former forest.

The development is located in Antigua's volcanic geologic region. It is located in the Montero soil suite which is suitable for the farming of Antigua black pineapples, sugarcane, bananas, mangos, and citrus. Particularly, it is located within the York Series that has grey-brown sandy soil that is often mixed with coral. In practice, very little is cultivated in this area. Several ghauts flow in from the Shekerley Mountains, through nearby valleys such as the Christian Valley, and into the harbour. The area is considered to be at very low risk for landslides and at moderate risk for drought.

The neighbourhood is to the north of Ffryes hamlet and to the southwest of Ebenezer. It can be accessed by Valley Road and is about 1.3 kilometres from central Bolans, 1.4 kilometres north of Ffryes, 2.3 kilometres north of Orange Valley, 7.5 kilometres from the island's largest city St. John's, and 13.2 kilometres from the nearest international air service at V. C. Bird International Airport. The development is located to the east of Lignum Vitae Bay, to the south of the Pearns Point peninsula, and to the north of several small ponds and beaches such as Valley Church Beach, Big Ffryes Beach, and Little Ffryes Beach. The main beach in the development itself is Jolly Beach.

== History ==
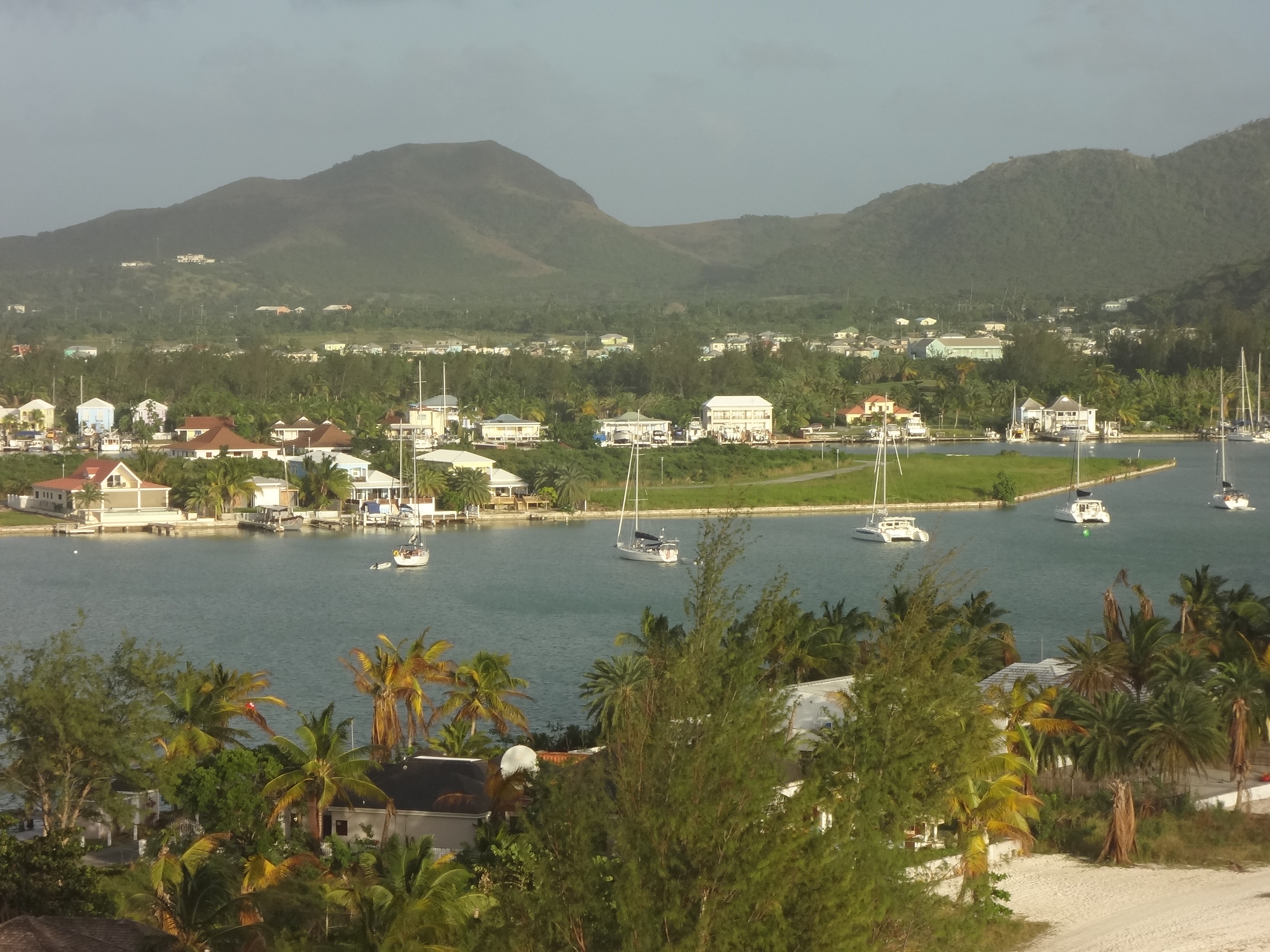
Jolly Harbour in 2015

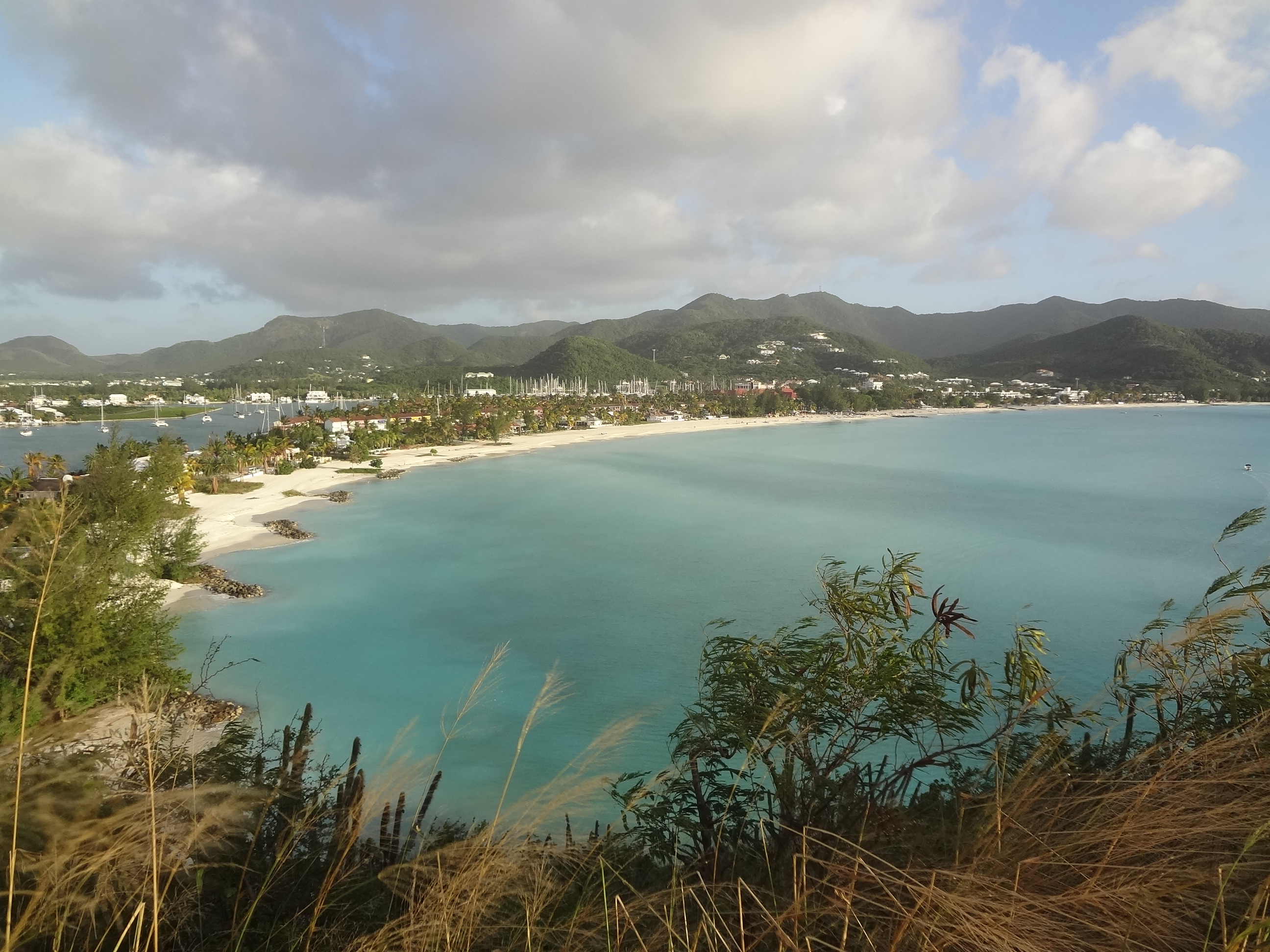
View of Jolly Beach from the north

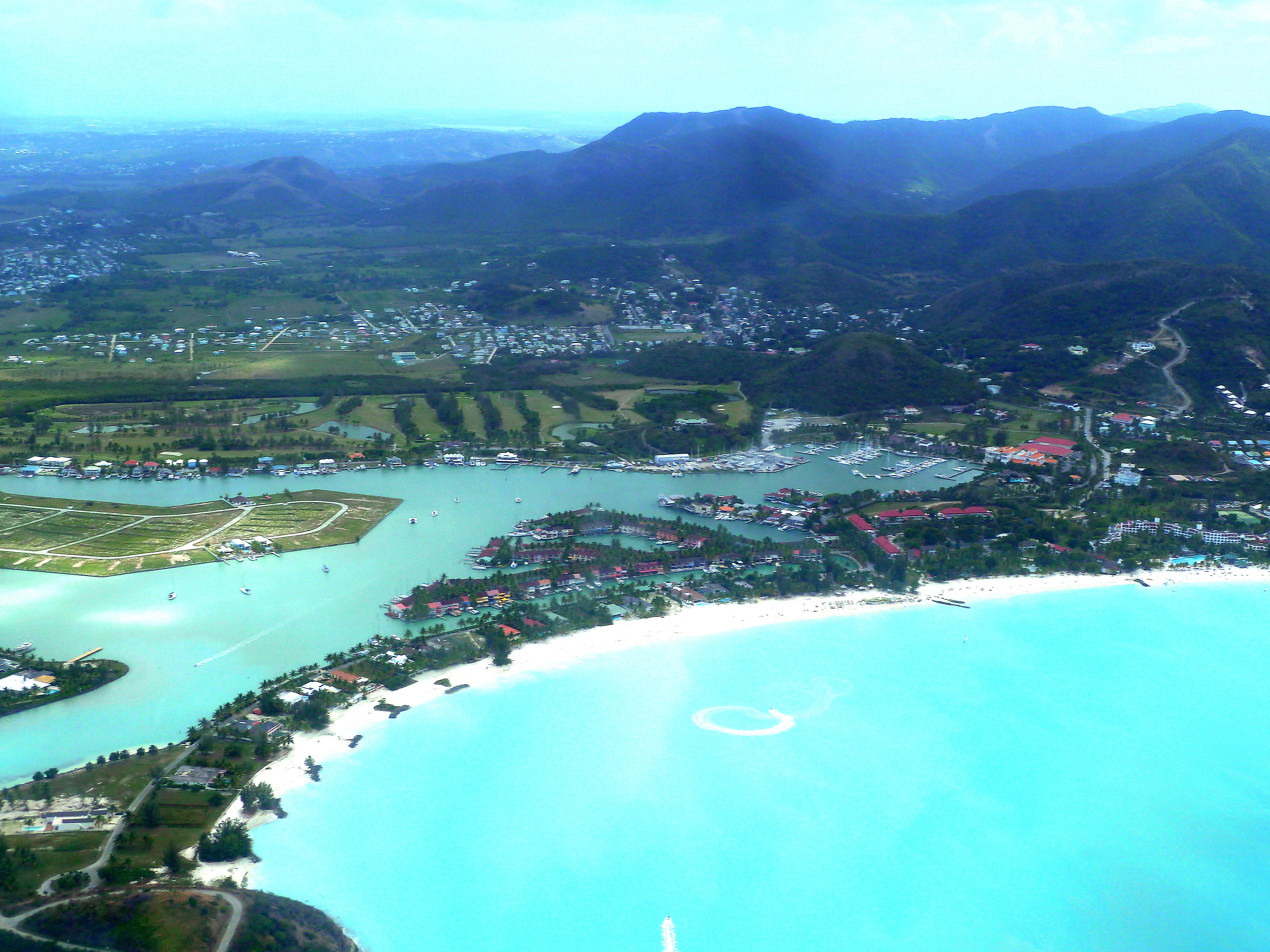
Aerial view of Jolly Harbour and the rest of Bolans, 2012

Jolly Beach is among the oldest Archaic period sites in the Leeward Islands. The archaic people's artifacts have been dated to between 1775 BC and 1589 BC, including flint tools likely sourced from Long Island and canoes used to fish and travel between the islands. In its natural state, what is now Jolly Harbour was a swampy mangrove wetland labeled on a 1959 map as a "salt pond". Prior to the establishment of the development, the coastal area was simply known as Lignum Vitae Bay, a name that continues to refer to the bay area touching Jolly Beach. Somewhat close to Jolly Harbour is a site known as Jolly Hill, a sugar plantation established in the seventeenth century.

In 1968, the 78-room Jolly Beach hotel was founded. It was eventually acquired by Swiss businessman Alfred Erhart in the 1970s who built an adjacent 384-room extension, becoming the largest hotel on the island. Erhart is considered the pioneer of development in the area. Immediately before the development of the area in the 1980s, Jolly Harbour was a marine habitat often used for duck hunting by nearby residents in the winter. Small vessels would often shelter in the area during hurricanes and it was an important area for fisheries. When development began, resources were initially focused on exterminating the mosquitos that annoyed the hotel's guests, however, it quickly evolved into a US$400 million development that resulted in land reclamation and the destruction of the mangroves. Important infrastructure was built, as well as a casino and many of the neighbourhood's modern-day facilities. Many were skeptical about the development due to its environmental impact and hurricane risks.

Like the rest of Antigua, Jolly Harbour was severely impacted by the COVID-19 pandemic. By July 2022, the original Jolly Beach hotel was in disrepair and many former employees joined together to demand over XCD$7 million in severance payments.

The development was owned by Caribbean Developments (Antigua) Limited (CDAL) for most of its history. The company managed real estate and shared facilities until it was acquired in 2024 by Sabana Holdings.

In late 2024, the casino, which had sat abandoned for several years, was demolished to make way for a shopping centre. After intervention from the government, the Jolly Beach hotel was reopened in December 2022.

== Economy ==
The marina and commercial activity are a major draw for tourists, with Jolly Harbour having shops, bars, restaurants, a golf-course and a boatyard. The marina complex was developed on land that was previously a swamp and beach. The marina is dominated by the casino building, which has laid abandoned for many years. The area is a popular location for expats to buy property as there is also a gated community. The neighbourhood has an Epicurean location. Jolly Harbour is the sole port of entry on Antigua's southwest coast and immigration services are provided at a yellow building in the marina.

== Demographics ==
In 2011, Jolly Harbour was composed of three enumeration districts with a combined population of 403. Jolly Harbour is one of the most ethnically diverse areas in the country, with Africans (50.79%), whites (36.91%), other mixed (4.97%), mixed black/white (1.83%), other (1.83%), East Indians (1.57%), Hispanic people (1.05%), Syrian or Lebanese (0.79%), and unknown (0.26%). Only 46.60% of the population was born in Antigua and Barbuda, with the remainder being born in locations such as the United Kingdom (12.83%), 'other European countries' (10.21%), Jamaica (4.97%), the United States (4.71%), Canada (4.71%), and Guyana (3.14%). Religious trends slightly deviated from the rest of the country, although the majority of the population are Protestant Christians, with the largest religious groups in the village including Roman Catholics (19.63%), Anglicans (18.06%), irreligious people (11.78%), and Methodists (9.95%).

== Features ==
There are several important locations in the development. In the main commercial area, there is a shopping mall that contains restaurants, real estate services, and ticketing offices for tours. There are also suppliers for boats and fishers such as Budget Marine. Near the Epicurean supermarket, there is a community swimming pool and tennis and pickleball courts. Other than the Jolly Beach resort, there is also the Cocos Hotel immediately outside of the development and the Jolly Castle hotel.
