= Galleon Beach =

Beach in Antigua and Barbuda

- Beach
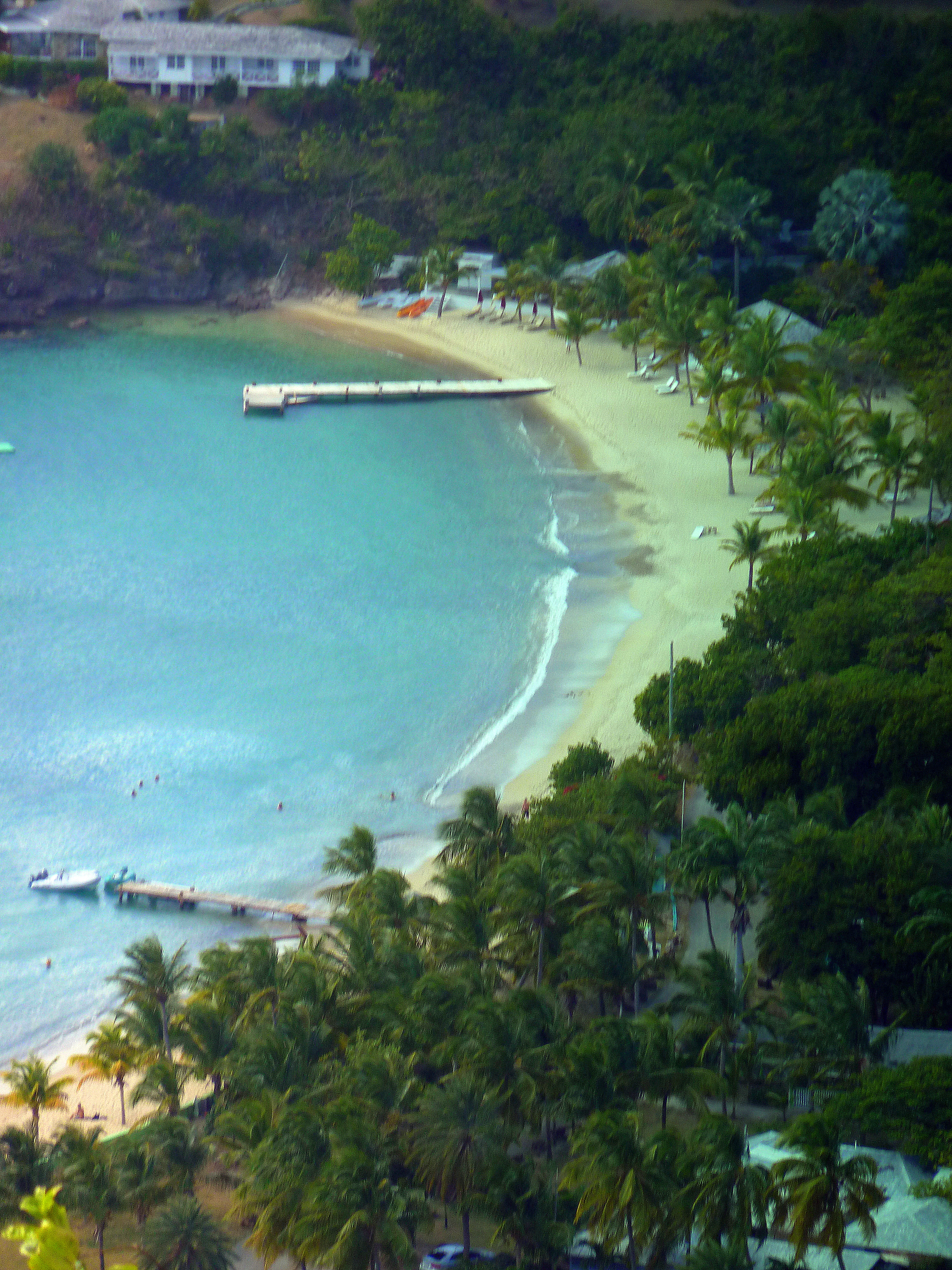
- The beach in 2012

- Location within Antigua
- Coordinates: 17°0′18.48″N 61°45′33.68″W
- Location: Saint Paul, Antigua and Barbuda

Galleon Beach is a beach and resort area on Freeman's Bay in English Harbour, Saint Paul. It is among the most popular beaches in the town and is located near several hotels and resorts, including the Galley Beach Resort and The Inn at English Harbour. It is best accessed by car or by water taxi. There are also several villas and guesthouses along the coast. The beach is located in the Antigua Naval Dockyard and Related Archaeological Sites, a UNESCO World Heritage Site.

It is a short walk from the Pillars of Hercules and is described by the local tourism authority as "boast[ing] white sand beaches and crystal clear blue waters". The beach is a nesting site for sea turtles.
