= Chris Bertish =

South African surfer

- Born: 1974 (age 51–52)
- Occupations: Big wave surfer, stand-up paddleboarder, adventurer
- Parents: Keith Bertish (father); Fran Bertish (mother)
- Relatives: Conn Bertish; Greg Bertish
- Website: chrisbertish.com

Chris Bertish is a South African surfer, stand-up paddleboarder, adventurer, and motivational speaker. In 2004 he gained recognition as the owner of 'Best Cribbar Barrel Vision Ever' after he pulled into a giant closeout at the infamous big wave spot in Cornwall. He won the Mavericks Big Wave Surf contest in 2009. In March 2017 he completed the first solo, unsupported stand-up paddle board (SUP) crossing of the Atlantic Ocean. He did it while supporting charitable organizations. He has also set other SUP world records. His efforts moved an obscure sport onto the forefront of many important media outlets. (Note: An issue of Time magazine ran his picture.)

== Background ==
In February 2010, Bertish competed at the 2009/10 Mavericks Surf Contest near Half Moon Bay, Northern California, winning the $50,000 big-wave surf competition. Watched by 50,000 spectators, the contestants experienced waves in excess of 40 ft (12 m). Bertish arrived at the competition without his equipment and had to borrow a board to compete.

In 2016, a failed attempt at crossing the Atlantic on a stand-up paddleboard occurred. The boat was piloted by Nicholas Jarossay, a French citizen who was rescued a week into his trip. (Note: One of the rudder lines failed, skewing the boat sideways to oncoming wind and waves. A large swell flipped the board, which turtled, and could not be righted (or even towed by the coastal rescuers). A Safety line held him fast to the craft, and hypothermia soon became a problem. Fortunately, he was rescued. Lack of a self-righting design was a major defect in the attempt.)

== Solo Atlantic crossing ==
In a 93-day trek, Bertish successfully completed a solo, unassisted and unaided crossing of the Atlantic Ocean on a stand up paddle board, going from Morocco to Antigua. The feat was the culmination of five years of preparation.

On 6 December 2016, Bertish set out from a marina in Agadir, Morocco, in a custom-built 20 ft (6 m) stand-up paddle craft on a journey of 7,400 kilometres (4,600 mi) and 120 days across the Atlantic Ocean to the Caribbean island of Anegada in the British Virgin Islands. His $120,000 craft was designed by Phil Morrison, a naval architect, and resembles a connected row-boat and a stand-up paddle board, called ImpiFish. It weighed 1,350 pounds (610 kg), which Bertish now considers to have been "too light." (Note: He normally paddles a S.I.C. Bullet 17 paddleboard, which weighs about 26 pounds (12 kg). "This weighed about 770 pounds, completely dry. Then there was another 330 pounds of gear, 50 liters of emergency water, and then myself on top of it. It was just really difficult to paddle. But I did so much training with the craft and honestly, after a couple weeks of paddling it, it became my norm and my home." As to the weight, Bertish added: "That sounds heavy ... [but] the craft was much lighter than even the smallest of the boats that have done similar crossings. The craft was probably too light. In the open ocean, you essentially get thrown around like a cork.”) It had a "number of technological amenities such as a satellite phone, a radar device, a MacBook, a water maker" – carrying the amount of fresh water he needed was impractical. On 9 March 2017, he arrived in Antigua at English Harbour becoming the first person to cross the Atlantic on a stand-up paddle board. He made the journey unsupported and unassisted in 93 days. Initially he wanted to continue to Florida, but due to forecasted poor weather made his landfall in Antigua.

The craft was self-righting if it capsized, avoiding the possibility of turtling. Gear included a life raft, flares, and an emergency grab bag. An integral part of maintaining stability in adverse weather was the use of sea anchors.

Bertish averaged 43 miles (69 km) a day, surpassing his planned 30 miles (48 km) daily. Paddling was mainly done at night to avoid sun exposure.

The attempt was made in order to raise money for several South African charities to feed, school and provide medical operations for children and succeeded in raising $412,000. The charities include Signature of Hope Trust, the Lunchbox Foundation and Operation Smile. The attempt had been sponsored by the financial group Carrick Wealth.

In addition to gaining the Guinness World Record for being the first person to cross the Atlantic Ocean on a stand-up paddle board, Bertish also set another world record during the attempt by travelling the furthest distance solo, unsupported and unassisted over open ocean in a day of 115.86 kilometres (71.99 mi). In fact, he set at least three world records during the crossing; and promised to pay for a charitable surgery for each of them.

== Adventurer ==
Previously he completed a 3½-day 320-kilometre (200 mi) paddle and a "source to sea" run-paddle-bike descent of the Thames River, with an English Channel SUP bonus crossing.

Unofficially and off the South African coast, he set the world record for 12-hour open ocean paddling, covering almost 130 kilometres (81 mi) aided by "great downwind conditions." The previous record was 120 kilometres (75 mi) held by an American.

== Honours ==
Bertish has been chosen, as one of 100 visionary people, to contribute a 250 word essay to be included in a 3D book. The 3D book will be designed by artist Ron Arad and will be a world first and printed in zero gravity. Called, Genius: 100 Visions of the Future, it is organised by the Albert Einstein Foundation Initiative for the Inspired by Einstein Project.

In 2018, South African artist, Michael Lee, painted three large oil paintings to commemorate the transatlantic crossing, Atlantic Solo, featuring Bertish battling a storm at night, with a reference to Hokusai's Great Wave image, Atlantic Soul showing the SUP champion in equilibrium with a calm ocean and various aquatic creatures, and Atlantic Epic, illustrating Bertish's arrival at the Pillars of Hercules in Antigua to complete the epic journey.

== See also ==
- Standup paddleboarding
