= Darkwood Beach =

Beach in Antigua and Barbuda

- Beach
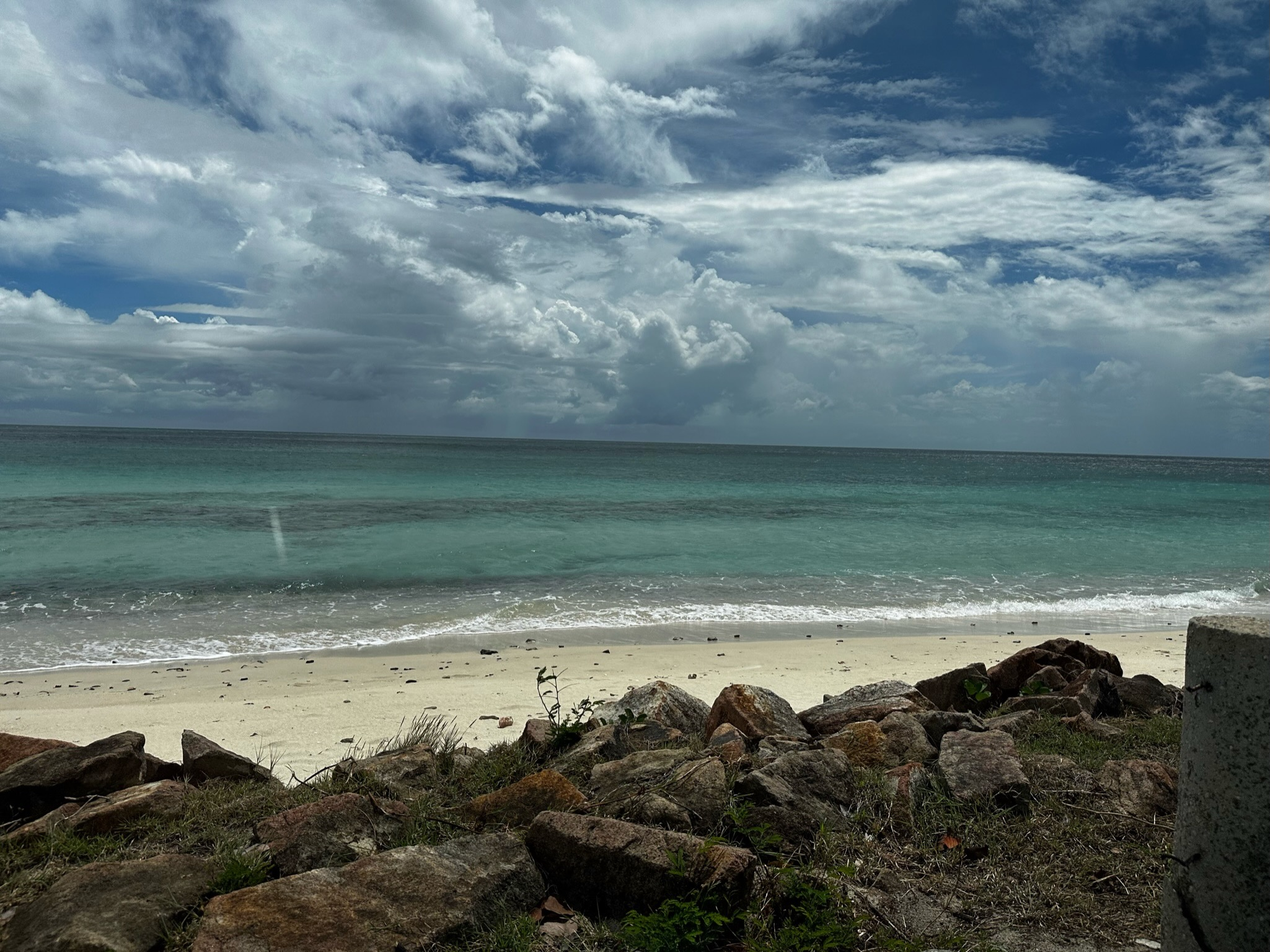
- The beach in 2023

- Location within Antigua
- Coordinates: 17°02′31.5″N 61°53′38.4″W
- Location: Saint Mary, Antigua and Barbuda

Darkwood Beach is a beach in Saint Mary, Antigua and Barbuda. The beach is located on Antigua's Caribbean coast near the former Picart's estate. It is located close to Jolly Harbour and is known for its blue waters, snorkeling, and breeze. On clear days, one can see Montserrat and its volcano.

The windmill tower of the Picart's plantation continues to stand here, and the estate received its name from Abraham Picard de la Ferte. There was also another plantation in this area known as Darkwood or Dead Sands. At the time of emancipation, 109 people were enslaved at Picart's. There is also a large body of water that nearly separates the beach from the rest of the island– the beach is located on a very thin strip of land. The windmill's remnants are an official historic site of Antigua and Barbuda.

There are several restaurants in the area and Darkwood is located immediately to the south of Ffryes Beach. It is close to the Orange Valley of the Shekerley Mountains.
