= McKinnon's =

City in Antigua, Antigua and Barbuda

Coordinates: 17°08′43.7″N 61°50′54.3″W

- Village
- McKinnon's Pond in 2023
- Interactive map of the McKinnon's main place
- Country: Antigua and Barbuda
- Island: Antigua
- Parish: Saint John

Population (2011)
  - Total: 1,247
- Time zone: UTC-4

McKinnon's is a village in Saint John, Antigua and Barbuda.

== Geography ==
McKinnon's Pond is located entirely within the boundaries of the village, specifically within enumeration district 31401.

== Features ==
- Dickenson Bay
