= Jolly Beach =

Archaelogical site and beach in Antigua

- Beach
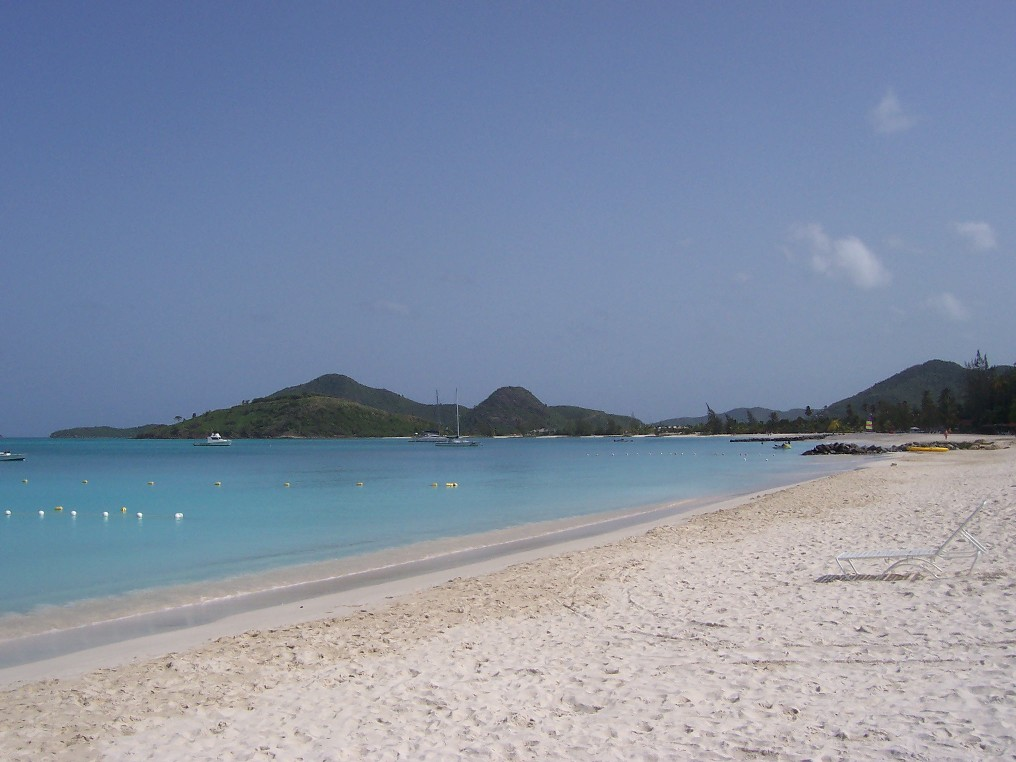
- Jolly Beach in 2006

- Location within Antigua
- Coordinates: 17°04′03.79″N 61°53′20.27″W
- Location: Jolly Harbour, Saint Mary, Antigua and Barbuda

Jolly Beach is a beach and resort area in Saint Mary, Antigua and Barbuda, near the Jolly Harbour development. It is one of the most well known locations on the island and is described by the local tourism authority as a "mile long powder white sand beach on the warm waters of the Caribbean Sea". It is located to the direct north of Valley Church Beach. The Jolly Beach Resort is one of the most famous on the island.

Jolly Beach is also an Archaic period site. It is one of the oldest sites of human activity on Antigua, with artifacts being carbon dated to as early as 1775 BC and as late as 1589 BC. The people who used this site were hunter-gatherers and made very simple flint tools. They likely used these tools to make canoes. Findings at the site are similar to those found at the Ortoire site in Trinidad.
