= Valley Church Beach =

Beach in Antigua

- Beach
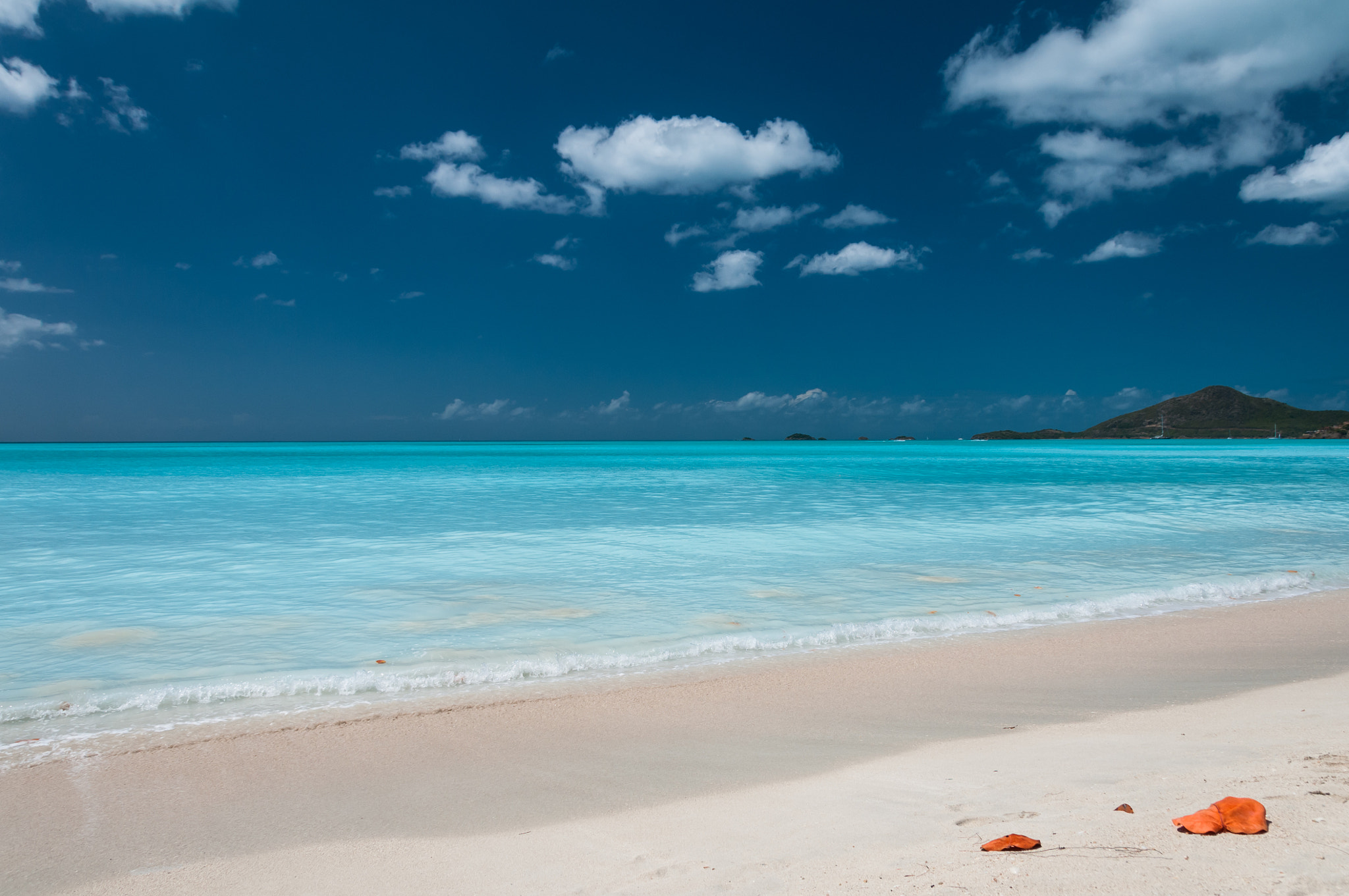
- Valley Church Beach in March 2012

- Location within Antigua
- Coordinates: 17°03′26.29″N 61°53′25.90″W
- Location: Ffryes, Saint Mary, Antigua and Barbuda

Valley Church Beach is a white-sand beach in Ffryes hamlet, Saint Mary. It is one of the longest beaches in Antigua and is also one of the most popular, being home to several resorts including the Cocos Hotel in the north and the Cocobay Resort in the south. The beach is to the south of Jolly Beach and to the north of Little Ffryes Beach. The bay has calm, turquoise waters and several low-density amenities are offered here including a few restaurants, jetskis, and kayaks. It can be accessed from Valley Road which is separated from the beach by a small pond. It is crescent-shaped and measures about half a mile long.

The beach is popular with cruise tourists.
