= Dickenson Bay =

Bay on the northwestern coast of Antigua

Coordinates: 17.159°N 61.850°W

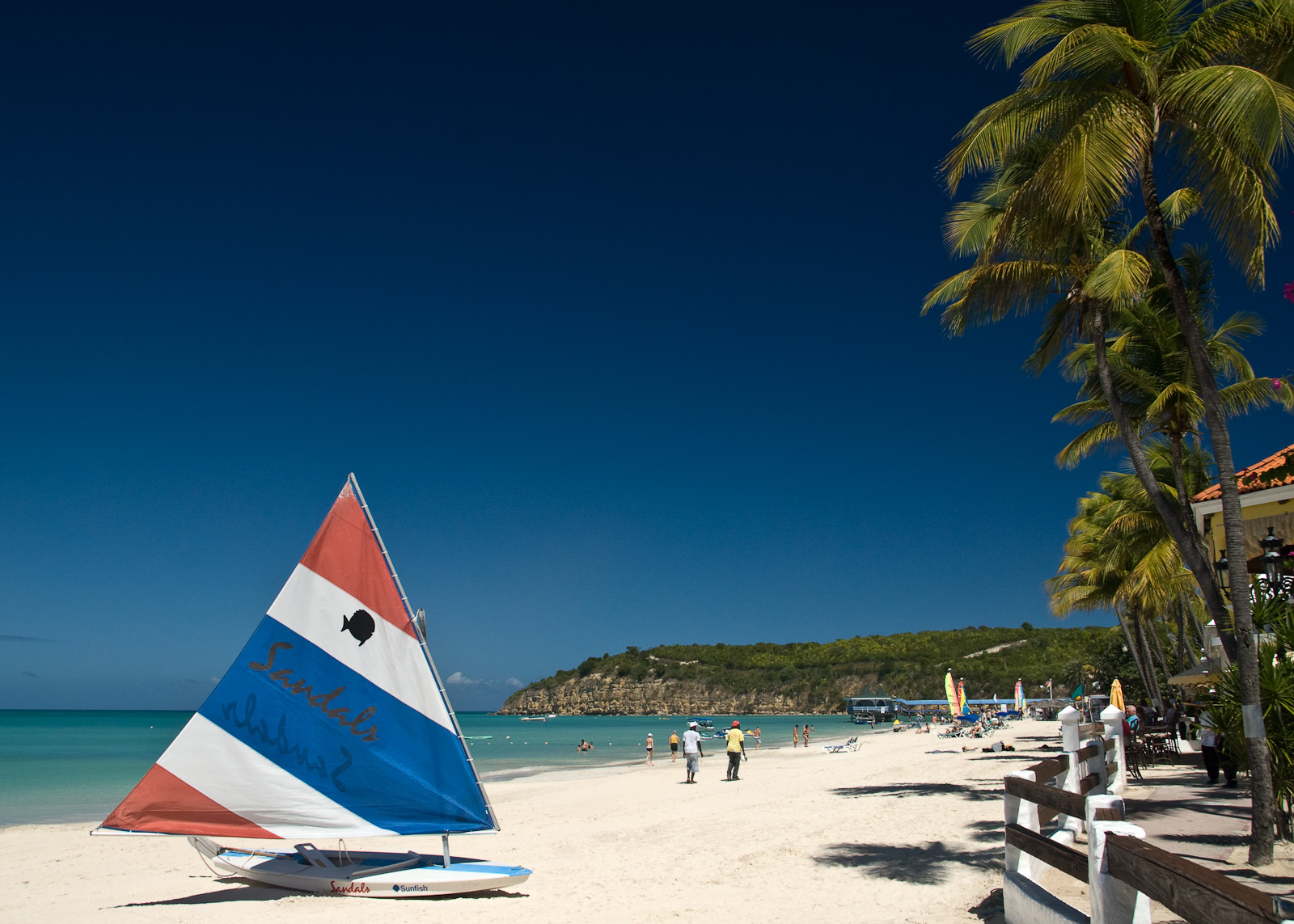
Dickenson Bay beach, Antigua

Dickenson Bay is located on the northwestern coast in Antigua, near McKinnon's.

While Dickenson Bay is not the most secluded beach in Antigua, its white beaches and tranquil seas attract many visitors. A string of large resort hotels give Dickenson Bay one of the island's largest collections of rooms. The beachfront is lined with restaurants, beach bars, and water sports concessions. Several small uninhabited islands and a one-mile long coral reef can be found off the coast of the bay.

Runaway Beach is located on the bay.
