= Runaway Beach =

Beach in Antigua and Barbuda

Coordinates: 17°08′42″N 61°51′26″W

Runaway Beach is a well known white sand beach located near Saint John's in the Caribbean country of Antigua and Barbuda. The beach has suffered years of hurricane erosion and is still recovering. It is located just south of Dickinson's Bay, and contains the well-known Corbinson's Point, located on the northern part of the beach.
