= Little Ffryes Beach =

Beach in Antigua

- Beach
- Little Ffryes Beach in 2023

- Location within Antigua
- Coordinates: 17°3′8.37″N 61°53′44.53″W
- Location: Ffryes, Saint Mary, Antigua and Barbuda

Little Ffryes Beach, also known as Coco Beach, is a beach in Ffryes hamlet, north of Big Ffryes Beach and south of Valley Church Beach. Little Ffryes Beach is located on a small bay between two resorts perched on some small hills: the Cocobay Resort in the north and the Diamond Point Cabanas in the south. There are also several restaurants within walking distance. The beach is located to the north of a small pond, forming an isthmus. The beach is located near the Valley Road highway.

Exploring Antigua describes Little Ffryes as "absolutely stunning", claiming it is family-friendly and one of the calmest beaches on the island. The report also notes that sea grape trees and palm trees line the shore.
