= Ffryes, Saint Mary, Antigua and Barbuda =

Ffryes Valley Church
- Hamlet
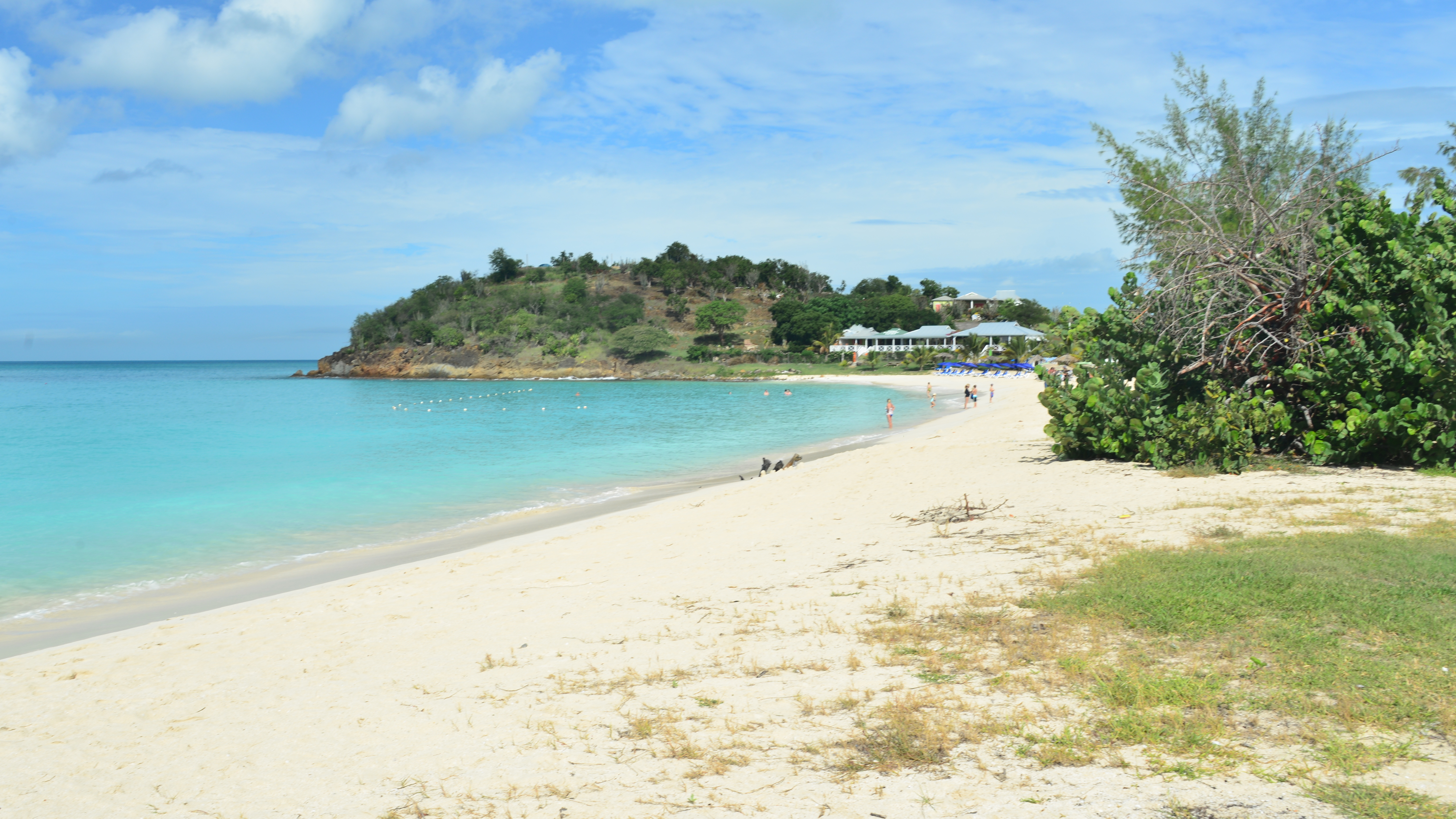
- Big Ffryes Beach

- Location within Antigua
- Coordinates: 17°3′10.84″N 61°53′21.83″W
- Country: Antigua and Barbuda
- Parish: Saint Mary
- Division: Bermudian Valley
- Main place: Boggy Peak

Ffryes (Note: /fɹaɪz/; South Antiguan: Frai [fɹaɪ], also known as Valley Church or Frye's) is a hamlet in Saint Mary on the island of Antigua.

== History ==
Plantations were established here as early as the beginning of colonisation, and the Valley Road was built to connect Bolans to Old Road along the southwest coast. One of these is associated with the Frye family, who are most likely originally from Ireland, which is where the name Frye's Valley for the area originates. In St. Philip's, on the eastern side of the island, the name Ffryes is also present. The Bermudian Valley was the name given to the hinterland.

The place was also the site of another church, Our Lady of the Valley Anglican Church, from which the location gets its official name. Today, the church serves as the parish of Saint Mary in Old Road.

The Cocos Hotel and Coco Bay Resort were constructed on the coast in the 1980s. This area is also home to the Orange Valley Agricultural Station, one of the island's bigger farms, with the Historic Sugar Plantation nearby. There are still two historic windmill ruins south of the hamlet.

The area encompasses a number of the island's more tranquil bays, including Coco Bay (also known as Little Ffryes Beach), Ffryes Bay (also known as Big Ffryes Beach), and Valley Church Bay (formerly known as Frye's Bay) in the north.

The area contains even more significant natural areas: the Valley Church Bay Important Bird Area; a local protected area designation is still pending. The Ffryes Bay Park, a nature park, is planned on Tamerind Hill, south of Ffryes Bay. The intended Mount Obama (now Boggy Peak) National Park will incorporate the hinterland. On the other hand, bigger development initiatives—like a cable car to Boggy Peak—are also frequently discussed.
