= Pillars of Hercules (Antigua) =

Landform in Saint Paul, Antigua

Coordinates: 17°00′03.10″N 61°45′39.84″W

The Pillars of Hercules are a landform at the entrance of English Harbour in Antigua. It is located below Fort Charlotte in the Antigua Naval Dockyard and Related Archaeological Sites, a UNESCO World Heritage Site. The "pillars" were formed by erosion caused by the wind and waves of the Guadeloupe Passage. These limestone rocks resemble pillars and are named after the Pillars of Hercules of the Strait of Gibraltar. It is an official historic site of Antigua and Barbuda.

The pillars were also referenced in the 2023 election campaign for the United Progressive Party.
