= Ffryes Beach =

Beach in Antigua

- Beach
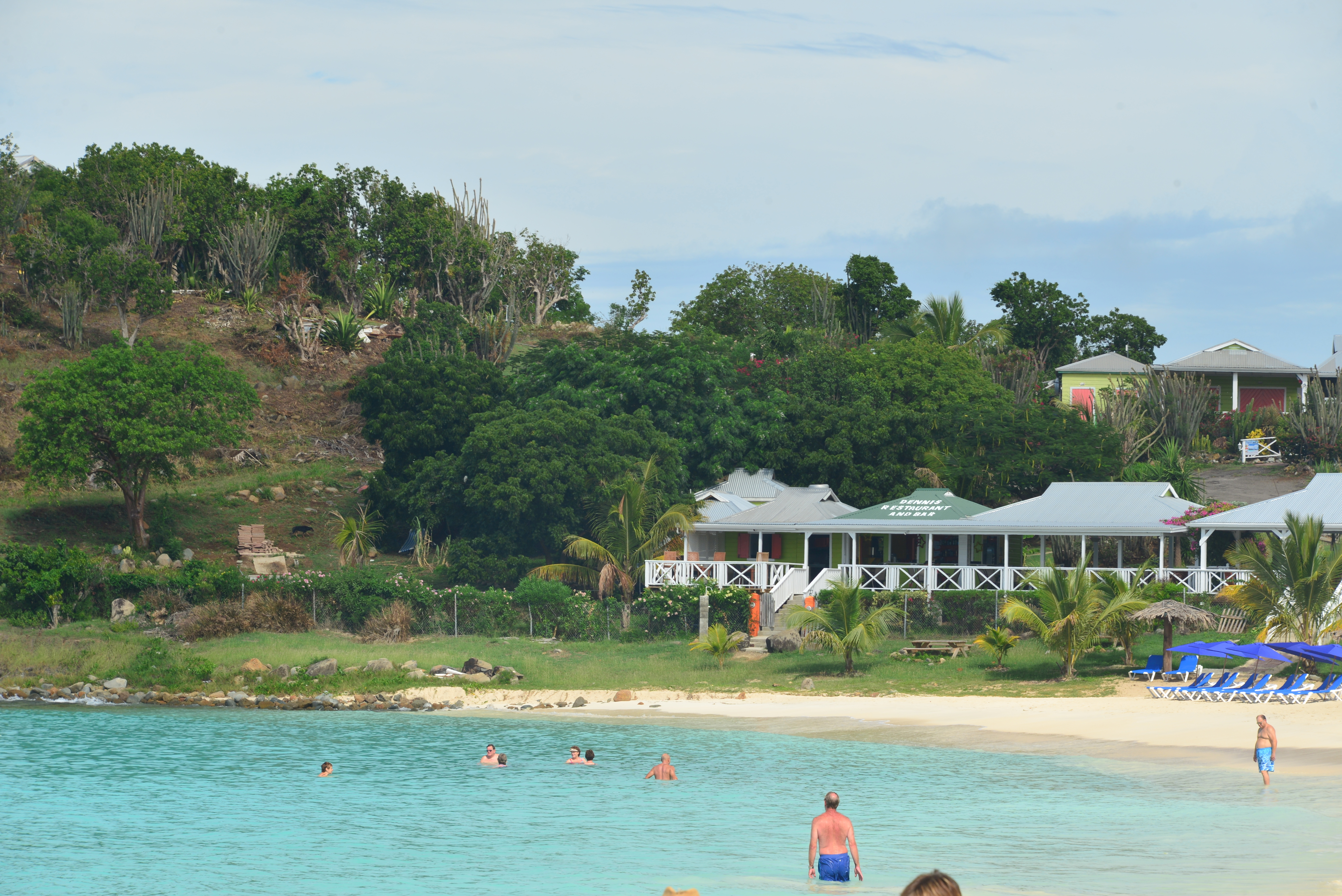
- Ffryes Beach in December 2015

- Location within Antigua
- Coordinates: 17°02′59.09″N 61°53′45.53″W
- Location: Ffryes, Saint Mary, Antigua and Barbuda

Ffryes Beach, also known as Big Ffryes Beach, is a white-sand beach in Ffryes hamlet, Saint Mary. It is one of the most well known beaches on the island and is located between Little Ffryes Beach (Coco Beach) to the north and Darkwood Beach to the south. The Tamarind Hills Resort, which is located to the south of the beach, describes it as "renowned for its white sand, turquoise waters, and lush vegetation". One vote ranked the beach as the 31st best beach in the world for 2025.

Several businesses and amenities are located in the beach's vicinity, including resorts, restaurants, and villas. The beach is located in the Leeward Islands xeric scrub ecoregion at the foothills of the Shekerley Mountains. It is located near Valley Road.
