= Glanvilles =

- Village
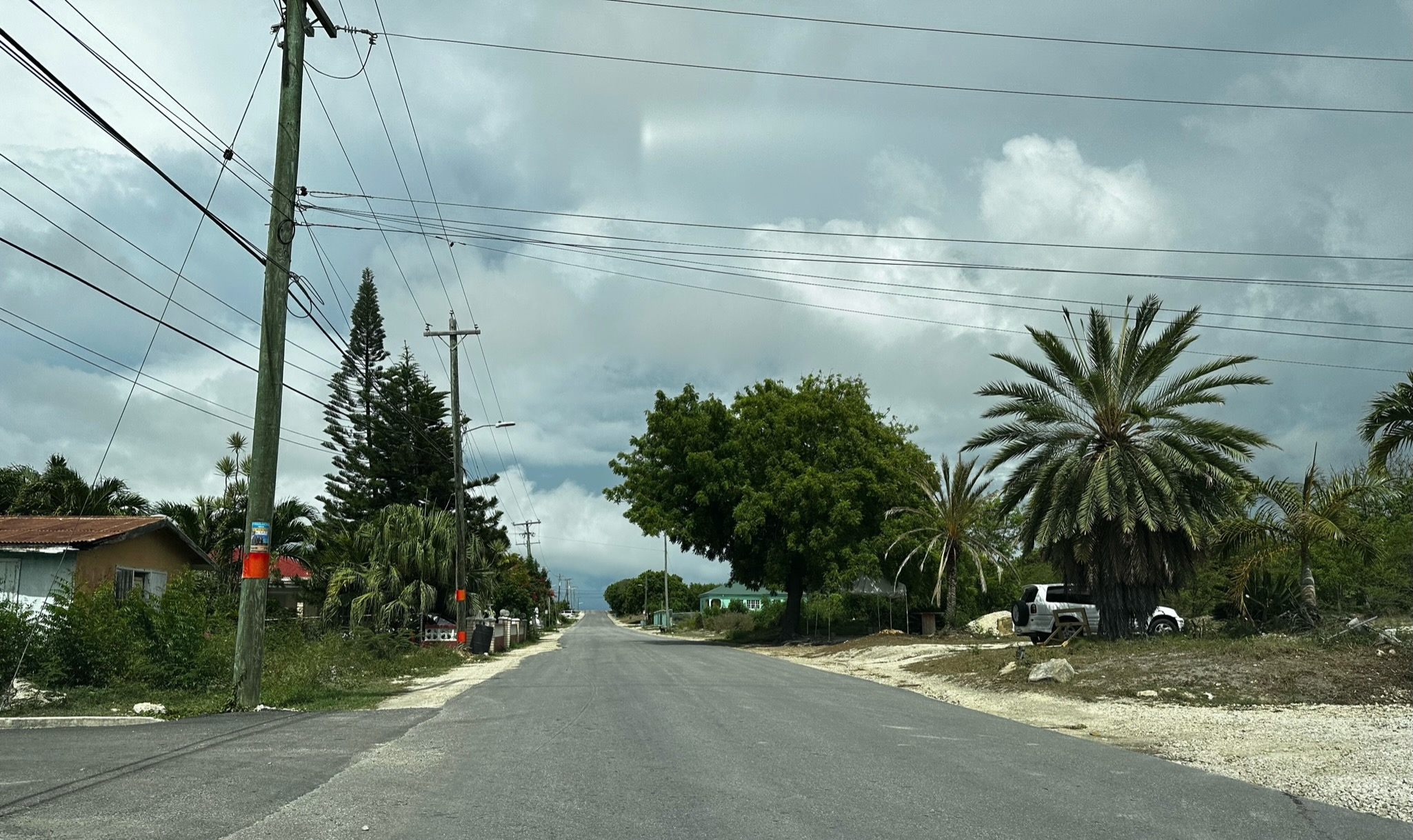
- Glanvilles in June 2023
- Interactive map of the Glanvilles main place
- Location in Antigua and Barbuda
- Coordinates: 17°05′08″N 61°43′28″W
- Country: Antigua and Barbuda
- Island: Antigua
- Parish: Saint Philip

Government
  - MP: Randy Baltimore

Area
  - Total: 1.36 km^{2} (0.53 sq mi)
- Elevation: 23 m (75 ft)

Population (2011)
  - Total: 445
  - Density: 327/km^{2} (847/sq mi)
- Time zone: UTC-4 (AST)

Glanvilles is a village in Saint Philip, Antigua and Barbuda. It is located on the Sir Robin Yearwood Highway between Pares and Willikies. It is located directly to the south of Seatons and north of Collins. The village was relatively small for most of its history, being primarily based around its namesake sugar plantation and overshadowed by its neighbour to the north, Seatons. However, a series of successive hurricanes caused much of the population in Seatons to migrate to Glanvilles, and today, Glanvilles is one of the larger settlements in the eastern portion of the island. Glanvilles had a population of 445 in 2011.

== Geography ==
According to the National Bureau of Statistics, Glanvilles has a total area of 1.36 square kilometres. Most of the area within village boundaries is covered by rural settlement, although on its outskirts there are also more diverse land uses. In the west, there is a small streak of mangrove, as well as rough grazing land and crop farming. In the north and east, land is almost entirely used for rough grazing. The southern border of the village has the most dense settlement, located along the Sir Robin Yearwood Highway. There is one stream in the village, Mercers Creek, which marks the western border. A 2019 study found one large pond located near the mouth of the creek as well as several smaller ponds dotting the village. The village is at high risk for drought and low risk for mudslides. It is in the limestone region of Antigua. Glanvilles has an elevation of about 23 metres.

Glanvilles is located about 1.1 kilometres from Seatons, 1.6 kilometres from Willikies, 3 kilometres from Pares, and 3 kilometres from Newfield. To the northwest, Glanvilles is bounded by Mercers Creek Bay, to the north by Seatons, to the northeast by Keeve's Landing, to the east by Willikies, to the south by Collins, to the west by the Mercers Creek Division of Vernons and Diamonds. Glanvilles is located on the Sir Robin Yearwood Highway (road Nº34) between Pares and Willikies. The village is located on the parish boundary between Saint Philip and Saint Peter. Antigua's former rail system once passed through Glanvilles. The nearest international air service to Glanvilles is 9.4 kilometres away at the V. C. Bird International Airport.

== History ==
The name "Glanville" was first recorded in Antigua in 1667. A man named Richard Glanfield (also spelled Glanvile or Glandvield) was noted as claiming some land in the Five Islands area. In 1710, a man named William Glanville was granted 160 acres of land in the New North Sound division (now Saint George). In 1748, Walter Weir left a plantation known as Glanvilles to George Lucas Osborne, although this may have been an alternate name for the Weir's plantation in Saint George. 106 people were enslaved at the Glanvilles sugar plantation at the time of emancipation in 1834. The plantation was mentioned in 1847 as being owned by absentee John Tollemach, a member of parliament. A 1851 map further confirmed this. In the 1856 census, Glanvilles was considered an estate rather than an independent village and was home to 22 people in 7 homes. In 1866 Glanvilles was referred to in a letter as being a large estate, but that some of the land was unfit for growing cane. Some buildings were very dilapidated but many of the land was undeveloped and good for exploiting. By the end of the century, the Antigua Observer had a Glanvilles correspondent that covered much of the news in the northern half of Saint Philip.

In March 1872, the Antiguan government announced repairs on a third class road in the village connecting it and Seatons. A June 1873 report stated that this road was primarily used by Seatons residents (then the larger village) but was very dangerous to horse traffic and impassible for carts. The report called for an entirely new road to be built that would better connect the two villages. A police report from 1884 noted the theft of a ewe in the area– the sheep was identified by the estate's manager as he branded the sheep's ear. John Horsford was arrested in the crime. In 1890 the road to the area was described as a "disgrace to any civilized country". In December 1890 the road was finally prepared for widening, a well known grape tree in Glanvilles was used as a reference. In 1921, the Glanvilles estate measured 300 acres.

In 1950, Hurricanes Dog and "Cat" devastated the village and forced residents from the coastal village of Seatons to move to Glanvilles. This caused Seatons to lose its status as a major village in the area for quite some time. Glanvilles Pasture became renowned in the region for its church functions on holidays. Next to St. Stephen's Anglican Church there were brass bands and horse racing. In the 1940s the estate was purchased by the Antigua Syndicate. Following the introduction of universal suffrage, the village was eventually zoned into the St. Philip's North constituency. Glanvilles had a population of 294 in 1991, 418 in 2001, and 445 in 2011. In 2009, the Glanvilles Secondary School was opened. There is a clinic in Glanvilles that was not in use for a long period of time, but after protests in 2021, the clinic was opened, after only being used as a COVID-19 testing center. In 2025 it was announced that the secondary school would be merged with the one in Pares. This attracted much backlash.

== Demographics ==
In 2011, Glanvilles had a population of 445 spread across two enumeration districts. The largest ethnic group in the village were African descendants (96.03%). Persons in the unknown category (3.44%) and the "other" (0.53%) category made up the remainder of respondents. The village was majority Protestant Christian, with major denominations including Adventists (38.87%), Anglicans (18.77%), and Methodists (13.14%). Most of the population (74.07%) was born in Antigua and Barbuda. Other birth locations included Jamaica (5.29%), the United States (4.50%), Guyana (3.97%), and Dominica (2.91%). Of people born in Antigua and Barbuda, 8.21% had lived overseas at some point in their life. 58.99% of the population was of working age (18–59), 28.84% were children (0–17), and 12.17% were elderly (60+). In 2011, there were 141 households in the village. Most homes used either concrete blocks (46.81%), wood (25.53%), or a combination of wood and concrete (21.28%) for their outer walls. 97.16% of homes had sheet metal roofs.

== Points of interest ==
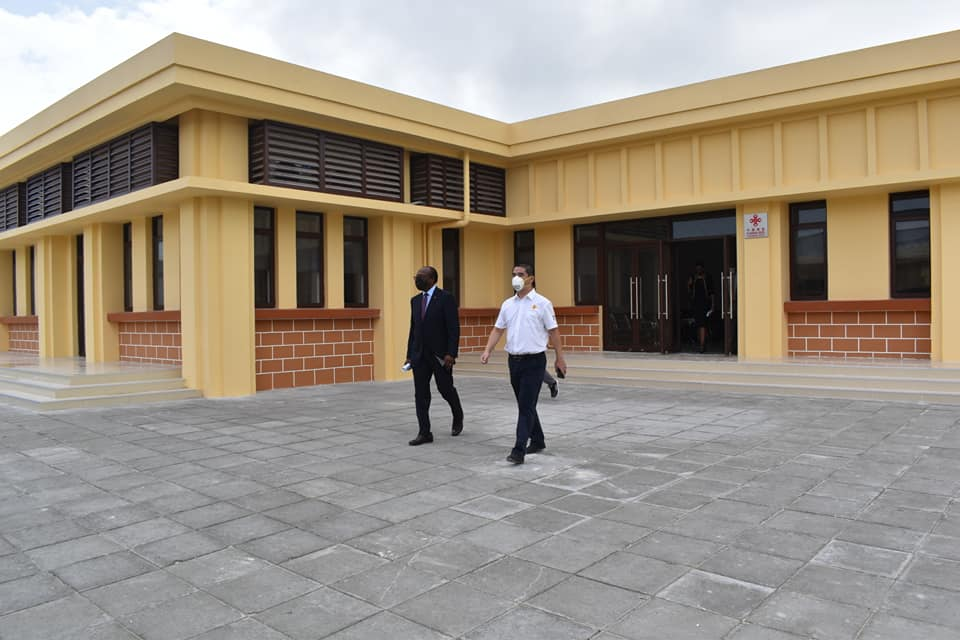
Molwyn Joseph visiting the Glanvilles Polyclinic

The cemetery at St. Stephen's Anglican Church was once used to bury Antigua's lepers. The church is one of the oldest on the island, with gravestones dating back to 1804. It is likely that stones from nearby Betty's Hope were used to maintain the church as well. There are also a Nazerene and a Seventh-day Adventist church in the village. One of the largest structures in the village is the clinic which fully opened in 2021. Muffy's Eastside Grocery is the only grocery store in the village. The former windmill of the Glanvilles estate continues to stand in the village and is considered to be in good condition as of a 2016 study.
