= Sir Robin Yearwood Highway =

Highway in Antigua

Coordinates: 17°05′09.3″N 61°44′36.5″W

Road 34
- Sir Robin Yearwood Highway
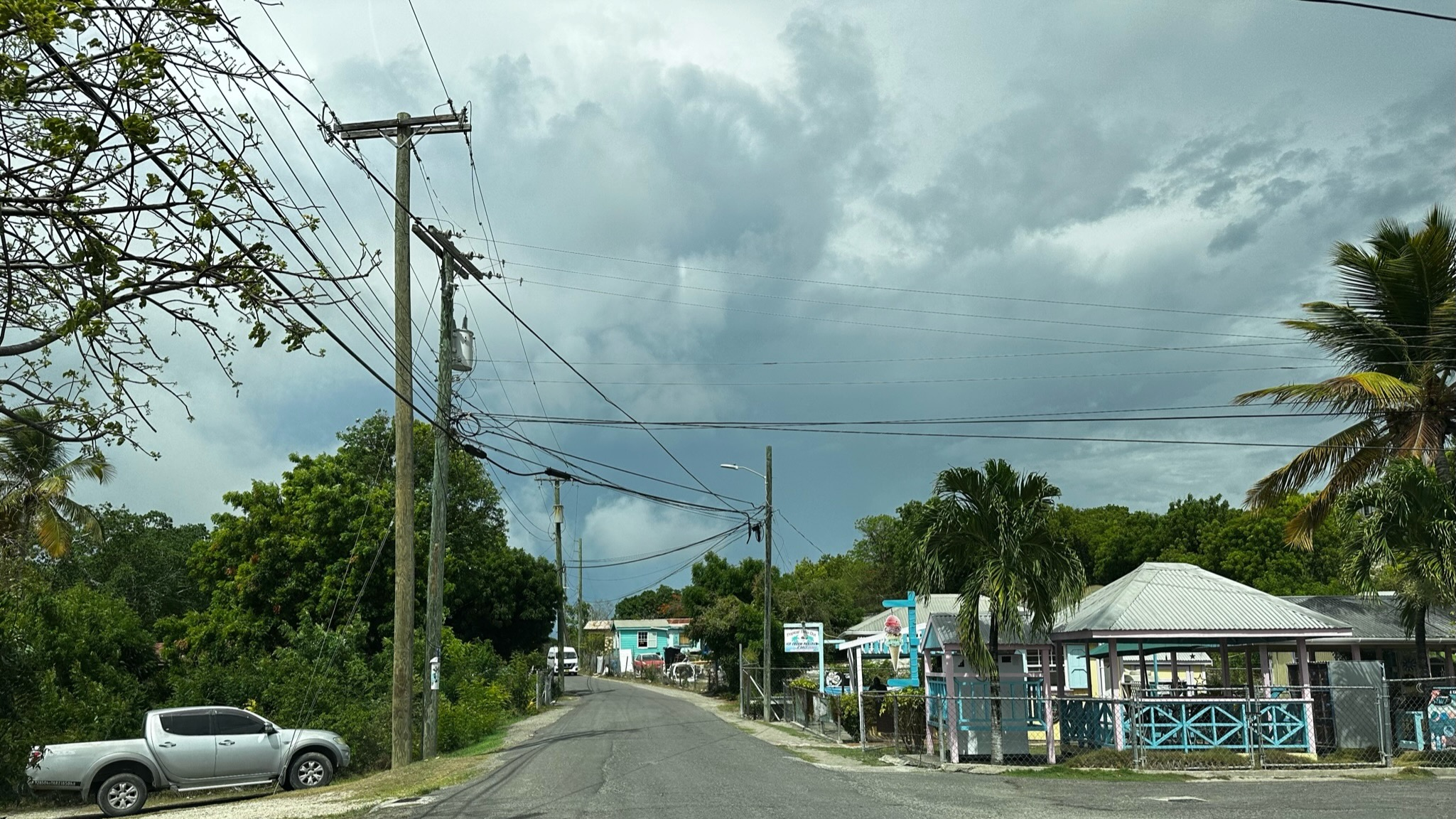
- The highway in Willikies

Route information
- Length: 10.1 km (6.3 mi)

Major junctions
- From: Mount Joy Roundabout in Vernons
- To: Long Bay Roundabout in Long Bay

Location
- Country: Antigua and Barbuda

Highway system
- Roads in Antigua and Barbuda

The Sir Robin Yearwood Highway is a highway in Antigua. It was renamed for Robin Yearwood on 29 January 2026 ahead of his fiftieth anniversary of parliamentary service. It is composed of Pares Village Main Road, Glanvilles Road, and Willikies Road. The road commences at the Mount Joy Roundabout adjacent to the Mount Joy Service Station. The road continues to the junction at 0.5 km with Lyons Hill Road. It continues eastward to the junction at 2.1 km in Pares with an unnamed road, followed by a junction with Crumps Road at 3.2 km, Collins Road at 4.2 km, Seatons Road at 4.8 km, one at 5.3 km, another at 6.0 km, 6.5 km, 6.9 km, 8.0 km, Laurys Bay Road at 8.5 km, Devils Bridge Road at 9.5 km. It terminates at the roundabout at Long Bay. The highway is one of the main links to the eastern region of Antigua, traveling through Saint Peter and the northern peninsula of Saint Philip. Settlements on the road include Vernons, Diamonds, Pares, Mercers Creek, Glanvilles, Willikies, and Long Bay. The land around the road is primarily used for crops and rough grazing, although the road passes through some rural settlements and forests as well. Most of the road is at low or moderate risk for landslides.

== Junctions ==
Parish	Location	km	mi	Destinations	Notes
Saint Peter	Vernons	0.0	0.0	Jonas Road and Sir Sydney Walling Highway	
Saint Peter	Vernons	0.5	0.31	Lyons Hill Road	
Saint Peter	Pares	2.1	1.3	Unnamed road #1	
Saint Peter	Mercers Creek	3.2	2.0	Crumps Road	
Saint Philip	Collins	4.2	2.6	Collins Road	
Saint Philip	Glanvilles	4.8	3.0	Seatons Road	
Saint Philip	Glanvilles	5.3	3.3	Unnamed road #2	
Saint Philip	Glanvilles	6.0	3.7	Unnamed road #3	
Saint Philip	Willikies	6.5	4.0	Unnamed road #4	
Saint Philip	Willikies	6.9	4.3	Unnamed road #5	
Saint Philip	Willikies	8.0	5.0	Unnamed road #6	
Saint Philip	Long Bay	8.5	5.3	Laurys Bay Road	
Saint Philip	Long Bay	9.5	5.9	Devils Bridge Road	
Saint Philip	Long Bay	10.1	6.3	Long Bay Roundabout	
1.000 mi = 1.609 km; 1.000 km = 0.621 mi
