= Vernons, Antigua and Barbuda =

Vernons
- Village
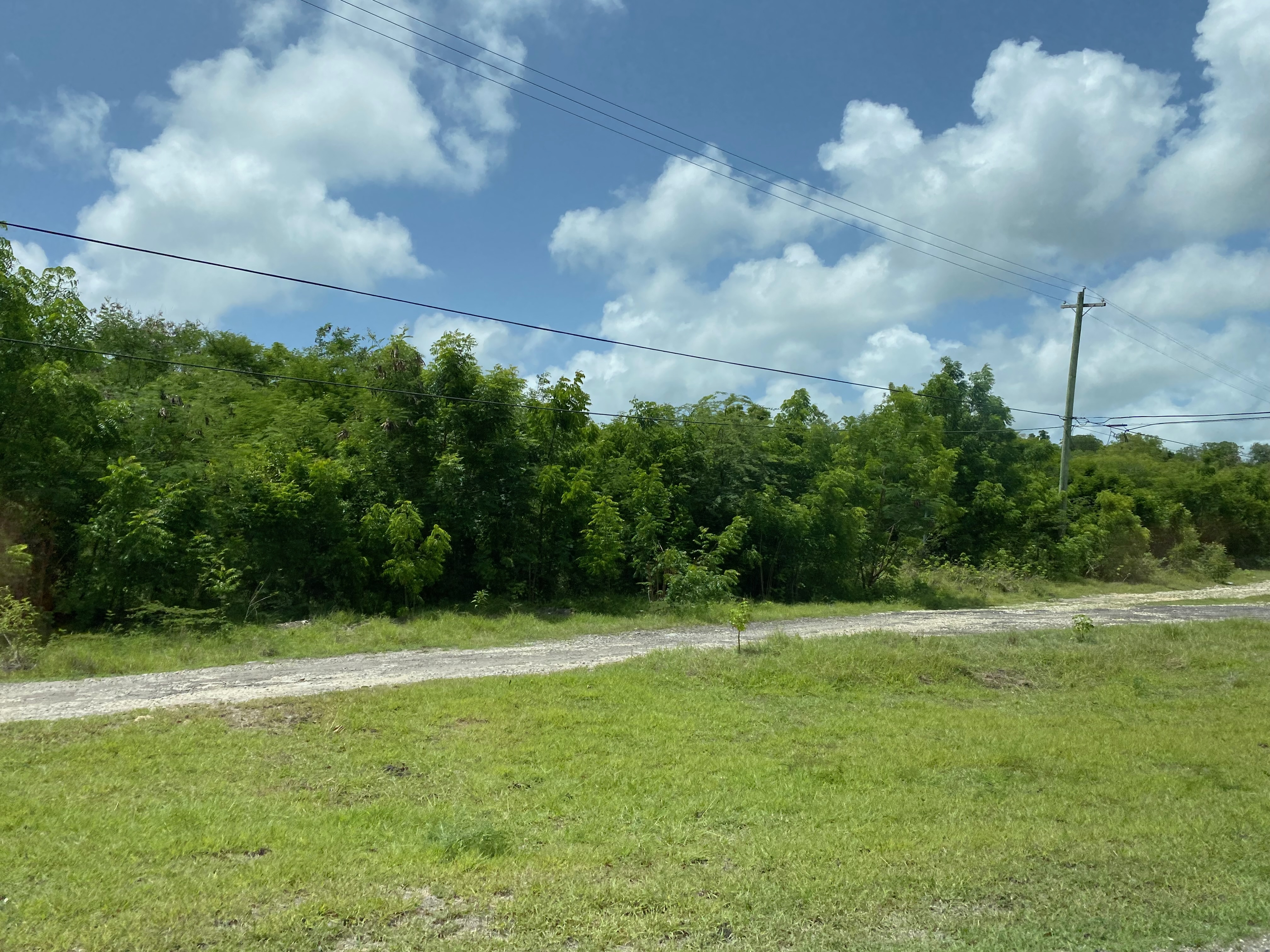
- Bush landscape in Vernons
- Interactive map of the Vernons main place
- Location within Antigua and Barbuda
- Country: Antigua and Barbuda
- Island: Antigua
- Parish: Saint Peter

Government
  - MP: Rawdon Turner

Area
  - Total: 19.47 km^{2} (7.52 sq mi)

Population (2011)
  - Total: 564
  - Density: 37.03/km^{2} (95.9/sq mi)
- Time zone: UTC-4 (AST)

Vernons is a village in Saint Peter, Antigua and Barbuda. Vernons is located in the northern half of the parish, and geographically is one of the largest villages on the island. Vernons is located to the southwest of Parham, to the northwest of Pares, to the southeast of the Sir Vivian Richards Stadium, and to the northeast of Freemans. In the locality of Mount Joy there is a roundabout that serves as the junction of three major roadways. The village had a population of 564 in 2011, covering 19.47 square kilometres.

== Geography ==
According to the National Bureau of Statistics, Vernons has a total area of 19.47 square kilometres over seven enumeration districts. Due to the relatively large size of the community, there are a wide variety of landscapes. In the west, most of the land is used for rough grazing. There are small pockets of improved grazing and dispersed patches of forest. Most settlement, including the locality of Vernons itself, is in this area. The central regions of the community are mostly used for crop farming and rough grazing. There are some woodlands in this area that are subject to deforestation. The eastern area, known as the Mercers Creek Division during colonial times, is mostly forest with some rough grazing and crop farming. This is one of the most rapidly deforesting areas on the island due to the presence of the Antigua and Barbuda Special Economic Zone. There are also some islands merged into the community by the bureau. Guiana Island is entirely forest with some small paths traversing the island. Maiden Island, artificially separated from Long Island by the U.S. military, are both considered to be forests although both have significant clearing due to private developments. A 2019 study found dozens of small ponds, the most notable ones being located at 17°05′52″N 61°46′12″W near the village centre and two others: 17°05′14″N 61°44′11″W and 17°05′17″N 61°45′16″W.

The village is entirely located in Antigua's limestone formation. Nearly all of the village is considered at very low risk of landslides, although there are notable pockets of moderate risk as well. The elevation of the village varies widely, the elevation of the Vernons locality is about twenty-one metres.

The Vernons locality is about 1.47 kilometres southwest of Parham, 2.16 kilometres northwest of Pares, 1.68 kilometres southeast of the Sir Vivian Richards Stadium, and 2.21 kilometres northeast of Freemans. The village is bounded by Diamonds and Pares to the south, Parham and Blackman's Estate to the north, Paynters, Sugar Factory, and Upper Lightfoot to the west, and Glanvilles to the east. Based on the official boundaries, there are several notable oceanic features including Farley Bay, Mercers Creek Bay, Guiana Bay and North Sound. In the mainland portion of the village, there are several localities in the village including that of Vernons (17°05′43″N 61°46′14″W), Coconut Hall (17°06′20″N 61°44′27″W), Gilberts (17°05′26″N 61°44′20″W), Mount Joy (17°05′19″N 61°46′21″W), Cedar Hill (17°06′29″N 61°46′42″W), and Crabbs (17°07′27″N 61°45′22″W). There is also human activity in Maiden Island and a permanent population (3 in 2011) on Long Island. Vernons is a major transportation hub for the eastern portion of the island, with the Mount Joy area hosting the junction of Jonas Road, the Sir Robin Yearwood Highway, and the Sir Sydney Walling Highway. Old Parham Road also passes through the Vernons locality. Antigua's rail system once passed through Vernons. The nearest international air service to Vernons is 5.50 kilometres away at the V. C. Bird International Airport. Vernons once hosted a U.S. military seaplane base at Crabbs.

== History ==
The area of Vernons has been inhabited since pre-Columbian times. One major post-Saladoid site is located in Coconut Hall. This site was likely inhabited between 900 and 1200 AD. In the seventeenth century, Europeans and Africans arrived to the area following colonisation. Major estates in the area included the namesake Vernon's (est. 1647), Coconut Hall (est. 1711), Gilberts (est. 1750), Guiana Island (est. 1730), and Mercers Creek (est. 1650). Vernon's estate was located closest to the present-day village centre. It likely absorbed the Wakering Hall estate and was mentioned in a grant to John Vernon in 1664. This estate converted to steam in the mid 1800s and in 1864 had 400 acres. In 1863 the estate was put up for sale. Lynsey Hill was a location close to the estate that sick persons from Vernon's would be sent to. In the 1856 census, the village of Vernons had a population of 82, exactly 41 men and 41 women.

Politically, Vernons has been part of the St. Peter constituency since its establishment. This area has traditionally been a stronghold for the Antigua and Barbuda Labour Party. In 1991 the village had a population of 107. In 2001 it had a population of 354. In 2011 it had a population of 564.

== Demographics ==
Vernons had a population of 564 in 2011 spread across seven enumeration districts. The majority of the population (84.73%) was of African descent. Other ethnic groups were other mixed (6.73%), East Indian (2.55%), Hispanic (1.82%), mixed black/white (1.45%), unknown (1.45%), and white (1.27%). Most of the population (69.82%), was born in Antigua and Barbuda. Other countries of birth were the United States (7.09%), Guyana (5.64%), and Dominica (2.18%). 19.53% of non-immigrants in the village have lived abroad at some point in their life. The population was mostly Protestant Christian. Major religious denominations in the village included Adventists (16.79%), Anglicans (16.06%), and Pentecostalists (11.13%). Living conditions in Vernons are considered to be slightly above the national average according to a 2007 study. Vernons is considered upper medium income as of 2008. Most people in the town speak North Antiguan Creole.

There were 201 households in the village in 2011. The plurality of homes (48.76%) used concrete blocks as their main outer wall material. Wood (20.40%) walls were also widely used. 86.07% of homes had sheet metal roofs, the next most common option were asphalt shingles (6.97%).

== Features ==
Vernons is dotted with several historic windmills from when sugarcane cultivation dominated the Antiguan economy. There are plenty of businesses in the village, with the Mount Joy Roundabout being one of the most important transportation junctions on the island. The Mount Joy Service Station (17°05′18″N 61°46′23″W) is located adjacent to the roundabout and provides services to motorists as well as a mini market. In the Vernons locality there are several businesses including Cheyenne's Bakery, the Parham Corner farmers' market, and Cool Dayz Ice Cream. In Gilberts there is the Gilbert Agricultural and Rural Development Center (17°05′21″N 61°44′24″W) that provides services to farmers and vocational training. The Antigua and Barbuda Special Economic Zone is likely the most notable location in the village's boundaries, attracting international attention for its ambitious goals and environmental impact. The planned city is being built in what is currently Coconut Hall.
