= Willikies =

- Village
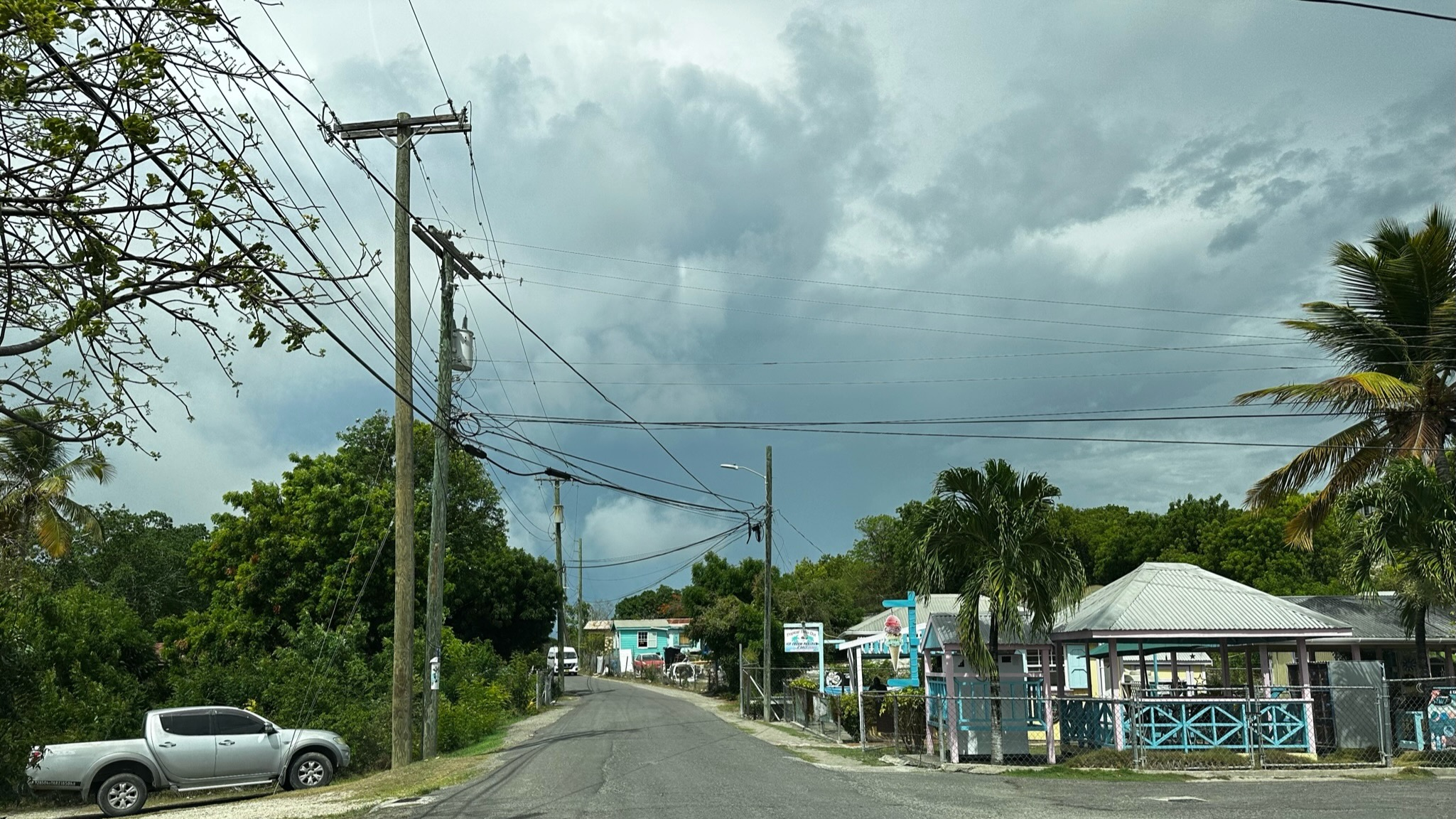
- Wilikies in 2023
- Interactive map of the Willikies main place
- Location within Antigua and Barbuda
- Coordinates: 17°5′10.28″N 61°42′31.75″W
- Country: Antigua and Barbuda
- Island: Antigua
- Parish: Saint Philip

Government
  - MP: Randy Baltimore

Area
  - Total: 3.79 km^{2} (1.46 sq mi)
- Elevation: 35 m (115 ft)

Population (2011)
  - Total: 1,270
  - Density: 335/km^{2} (868/sq mi)
- Time zone: UTC-4 (AST)

Willikies (/wɪlɪkiːz/) (Note: Sometimes spelled Willikie's; North Antiguan: Wilikee [wɪlɪkiː]) is a small settlement in the parish of Saint Philip, located in the eastern part of Antigua island in Antigua and Barbuda. It is located to the north of Nonsuch Bay, between Seatons and Indian Town Point. Other nearby villages include Glanvilles to the west and Long Bay to the east. Willikies had a population of 1,270 in 2011 over 3.79 square kilometres. Willikies was one of the villages that emerged following emancipation, growing to eventually become the largest settlement in eastern Antigua. Willikies is located on the Sir Robin Yearwood Highway.

== Geography ==
According to the National Bureau of Statistics, Willikies covers an area of 3.79 square kilometres. The village is located on a peninsula north of Ayers Creek. The densest rural settlement is located in the southeast of the village. In the west, most of the land is dedicated to crop farming (although land in the village is not considered particularly arable). The largest diversity in landscape is on the village's north coast. It is mostly tropical forest with pockets of rough grazing lands and some small settlement. A 2019 study noted the existence of a small pond in the western portion of the village. Willikies is located in the limestone region of Antigua. Most of the town is considered at low risk for landslides and inland erosion, although in the centre of the village there is a high risk zone. Willikies is at high risk for drought. The village has an elevation of about 35 metres.

Willikies is located about 1.5 kilometres from Glanvilles, 2 kilometers from Seatons, 2 kilometres from Long Bay, and 4 kilometres from Newfield. To the north, the village is bounded by the sea, to the west by Glanvilles, to the east by Long Bay, and to the south by Collins and Nonsuch Bay. Notable named geographic features in the village include Keeve's Landing, an inlet on the northern coast, and Lord's Cove, a smaller inlet. Off the coast of the village are Codrington Island and Pelican Island. Willikies is located on the Sir Robin Yearwood Highway (road Nº34) between Vernons and Long Bay via Pares and Glanvilles.

== History ==
Prior to the establishment of the village, there economy of the area was dominated by slave-based sugar cultivation like the rest of the island. A 1732 map shows various sugar plantations in the present-day village boundaries including Laviscounts, Rooms, Nonsuch, and Ayers. An 1891 map also shows other plantations such as Mayers (named after Anna Mayer around 1693) and Grants.

Willikies was one of the free villages established by emancipated Africans after 1834. The village was first mentioned as a locality in the St. Philip’s parish church register known as "Will Hicks". Will Hicks was a wealthy colored person who lived in the Belfast division. A later statement in the register refers to the area as "Will Hickies". Eventually, the name of the village evolved into Willikies. The Antigua Almanac of 1851 mentioned Grants as being owned by John Lake. In 1852, Kean Osborn (the namesake of Osbourn) was mentioned as being the owner of Rooms estate and various other plantations on the island. He left Rooms and his other estates to various beneficiaries, mostly family and friends. Also in 1852, Joseph G. Gore was mentioned as the owner of Mayers. The 1856 census showed "Wilkies" as having a population of 249 in 47 homes.

In July 1885 it was stated that the government cleaned out a pond in the village to be suitable for drinking. Experts stated that this pond would be a valuable water source and that a large quantity of mould was responsible for its cruddy appearance and low water levels. Prior to its refurbishment, it was also said that the pond had a large hole where all the water would run into, preventing local residents from collecting it. At some stages 60 to 70 people were working on it. In August 1890, it was noted that this pond had fresh water even though the island was experiencing a severe drought, with public calls for the improvement of roads in the area so more people could access it. William Haynes-Smith claimed credit for converting the pond into a full reservoir. On 18 August 1898, a boy was found dead in the village, presumably of starvation and poor water quality. The sugar plantations in the village continued to operate independently until mass-scale acquisitions by the Antigua Syndicate in the 1940s.

Willikies eventually became one of the largest villages on the east coast of the island. By 1970, the village had a population of 1,843 people in 404 households, about a third of the parish's population. The village was eventually zoned into the St. Philip’s North constituency, which elected Labour Party politician Donald Halstead as its first member of parliament in 1971. In 1976, voters in the constituency elected Robin Yearwood who represented the area until 2026, the longest serving member of parliament in the Caribbean and the Commonwealth until his resignation. Like the nation as a whole, Willikies experienced a drastic population decline around the time of independence, and by 1991, Willikies had just 1,042 people. In 2001, Willikies had a population of 1,179. In 2011, the village had 1,270 people.

== Demographics ==
Willikies had a population of 1,270 in 2011 spread across six enumeration districts. The village was mostly African descendant (88.52%), with other ethnic groups being: unknown (3.70%), Hispanic (2.78%), other mixed (2.22%), white (0.93%), East Indian (0.83%), other (0.65%), and mixed black/white (0.37%). The village was mostly made up of Protestant Christians, with major denominations including Anglicans (30.83%), Wesleyan Holinesses (20.33%), as well as a significant population (7.71%) of Roman Catholics. 76.02% of the village's population was born in Antigua and Barbuda, with the remainder being born in Guyana (5.28%), the United States (4.35%), Dominica (2.69%), the Dominican Republic (2.31%), and Jamaica (1.67%). Of people born in Antigua and Barbuda, 6.81% had lived abroad at some point in their life. A 2007 study notes a strong community spirit, although major issues include the presence of gangs and widespread gambling. Many people in the village are also forced to work two or more jobs. Employment in nearby hotels allows most of the villagers to avoid long commutes. Villagers also complained about the poor provision of public utilities. There are many abandoned properties and vehicles. One villager claimed that extreme poverty is non-existent in the village and that strong community values strengthen this.

In 2011, the village had 401 households. Most homes had either concrete (30.67%) or wood (22.94%) as the main material for outer walls. Some homes also used a combination of wood and concrete (20.70%), or concrete blocks (19.95%). 93.27% of homes had sheet metal roofs.

== Points of interest ==
The village is traversed by the Sir Robin Yearwood Highway east to west. The village has a primary school and several daycare centres. The village is also home to the country's main juvenile detention centre, the Boy's Training School. As there is no secondary school in the village, secondary school students travel to the Glanvilles Secondary School. Even though the village is quite distant from the largest city, there is no medical centre in the village. Adjacent to the primary school is a basketball court. There are also several restaurants, an ice cream shop, two car rentals, and the Our Lady of Mount Carmel Catholic Church. The village was once located at the end of a line of the Antigua sugarcane railway.

== See also ==
- Pares
- Mercers Creek Bay
