= Saint Peter, Antigua and Barbuda =

Coordinates: 17°06′N 61°46′W

Parish of Saint Peter
- Parish
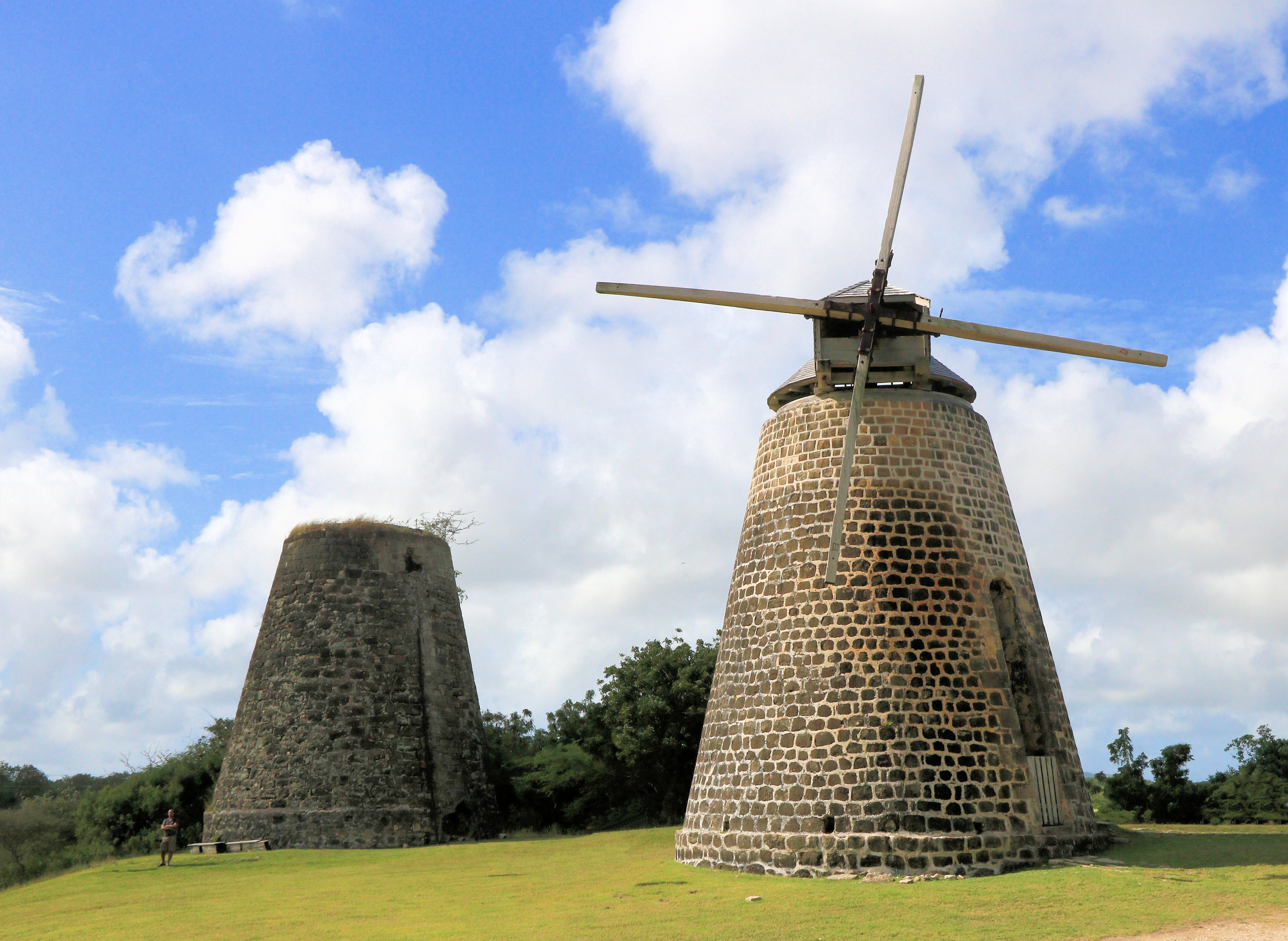
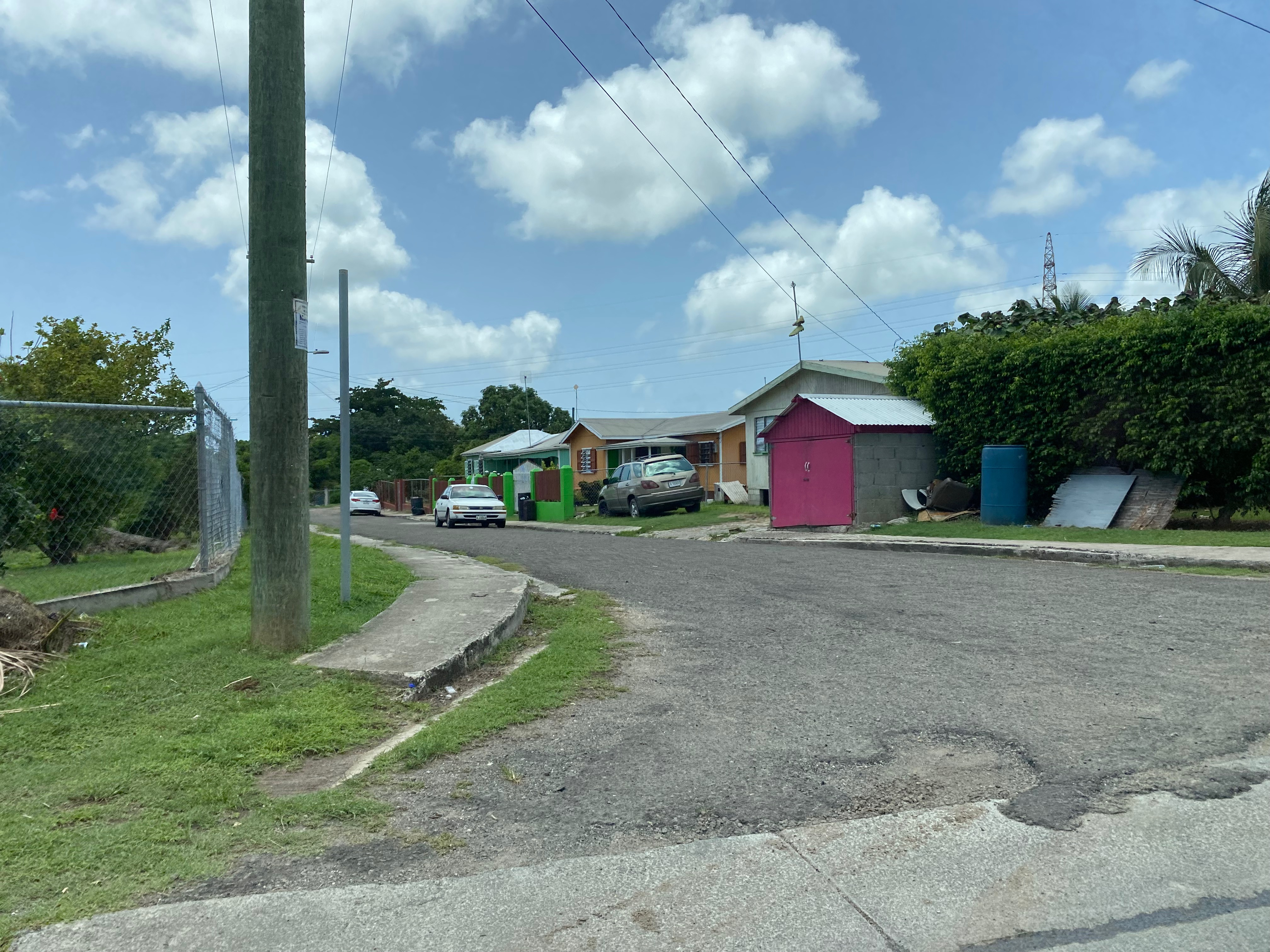
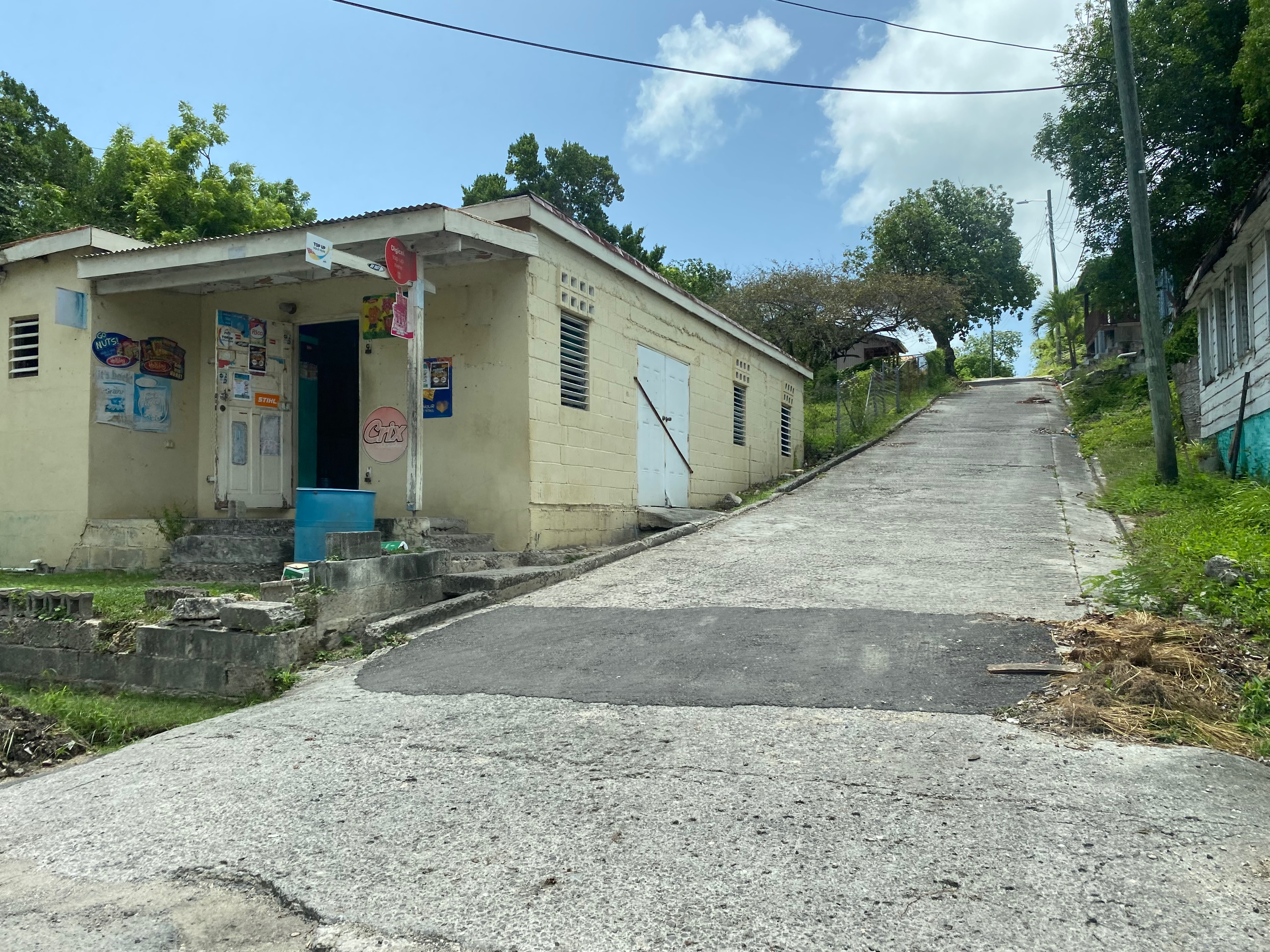
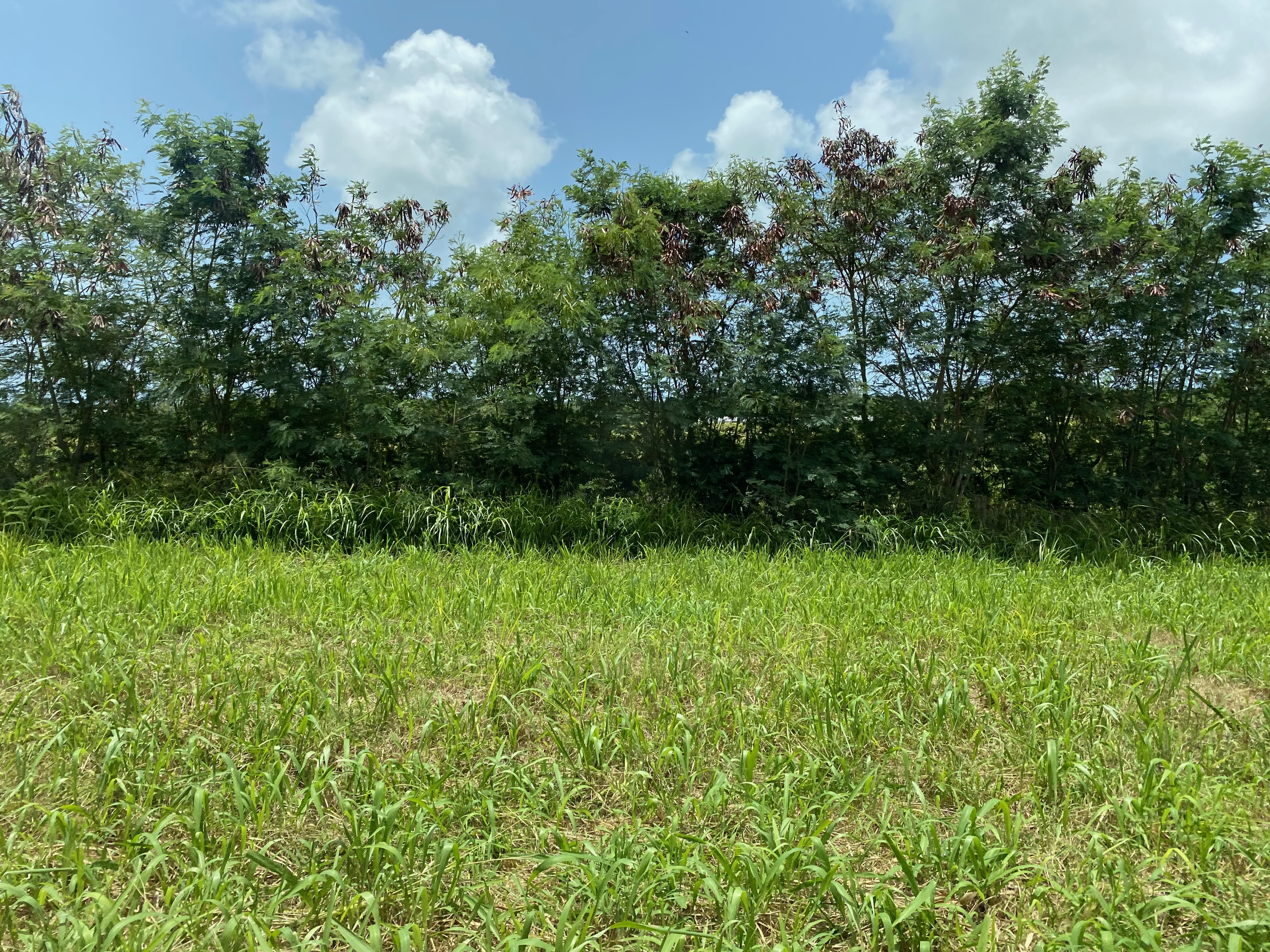
- (from top: left to right) Betty's Hope, A street in Parham, another street in Parham, A field in Saint Peter

- Country: Antigua and Barbuda
- Established: 24 August 1681; 345 years ago (old style); 3 September 1681; 345 years ago (new style)
- Capital: Parham
- Largest city: All Saints

Government
  - MPs: Rawdon Turner, Jamale Pringle, Anthony Smith

Population
  - 2018 estimate: 5,706
  - Density: 164.5/km^{2} (426.1/sq mi)
- HDI (2023): ▲0.850 very high · 2nd
- Time zone: UTC-4 (AST)

Saint Peter (Antiguan and Barbudan Creole: Sen Peeta), officially the Parish of Saint Peter, is a parish of Antigua and Barbuda on the island of Antigua. Saint Peter borders Saint Paul to the south, Saint Philip to the east, and Saint George and Saint John to the west. Saint Peter is dominated by farmland, savanna, and undeveloped fields, and its borders are not well-defined. The largest city fully within the parish is Parham, which is also the capital. However, the portion of the city of All Saints in Saint Peter is significantly larger than Parham. Saint Peter was created with the other four original parishes in 1692. It had an estimated population of 5,706 in 2018.

Saint Peter is mostly dominated by agriculture and industry, with the few populated places in the parish being portions of All Saints, Diamonds, Freemans, Pares, Parham, and Vernons. Most of the parish lives on the western border with Saint John. Pares is the only major settlement in the center of the parish. There is almost no settlement in the eastern portion of the parish other than the hamlets of Coconut Hall and Gilberts. In the northern areas of the parish, Saint Peter is home to Guiana Island and the North Sound Islands, as well as the Crabbs Peninsula. Long Island, home to three permanent inhabitants, and Maiden Island are legally part of Saint George, but are politically and statistically part of Saint Peter. Long Island and Maiden Island are counted as parts of Saint Peter for purposes of the census.

Saint Peter is not home to many tourist attractions, and the mainland portion of the parish is home to very few, if any beaches. Parham Harbour is sometimes used by local residents, specifically children, for swimming. Saint Peter is however home to many historic Amerindian villages, and the Betty's Hope sugar plantation, one of the major symbols of the island. Saint Peter also has populations of European fallow deer on Guiana Island. On the offshore islands, there are many clear waters and reefs, and many of the offshore islands, like Great Bird Island, are frequented by tourists.

Saint Peter was created in August 1681, when Antigua was divided into five parishes. Saint Peter and the four other parishes were permanently established in July 1692, and confirmed in January 1693. The primary objective of the establishment of parishes was providing for the parish church. The majority of the parish's lands were, and still are, used for agricultural purposes. Numerous historical relics from the parish can still be seen today, including the Mercer's Creek and Coconut Hall plantations.

== History ==
=== Amerindian presence ===
Twenty Hill, which is located in Parham, and Jolly Beach, which is located in Jolly Bay, are the two locations in Antigua that hold the distinction of being the earliest and most significant sites of human occupation (c.1775 BC).

=== British period ===
On 24 August 1681, the parish of Saint Peter was founded. Saint Peter was originally composed of the divisions of New North Sound Division, Old North Sound Division, and Mercers Creek Division. However, New North Sound split off to form its own parish, Saint George, in 1725. According to a map published in 1782, the parish had a small pond named Pinns Pond, and a small church near Pares. There were 27 slave plantations in the parish.

== Geography ==
Communities of Saint Peter

Population density in 2011

Although the parish is mostly flat and suitable for habitation, most of the population lives in the dense eastern cities on the western border. Very few localities are located outside of this region. The parish is home to most of the country's minor islands, and the parish is home to many creeks and bays. Most of the creeks are near the parish's borders. Most of the parish's water bodies are located in the southeastern portion of the parish, with Potworks Dam, shared with Saint Paul, being the largest. The parish is enclosed by many of Antigua's historic rail infrastructure.

== Demographics ==
Saint Peter is not a particularly diverse parish. In 2011, the parish had 5,317 people. As of the 2011 census, the parish has many ethnic groups such as African descendants (92.85% of the population), whites (0.39%), East Indians (0.75%), mixed black/whites (1.12%), other mixed (3.24%), Hispanics (0.50%), Syrians/Lebaneses (0.04%), others (0.33%), and didn't know/not stated (0.79%). The largest religious groups were Anglicans (20.29%), Adventists (15.46%), Pentecostals (11.22%), Methodists (10.87%), and irreligious people (7.68%). Additionally, 1.19% of the population was Rastafarian.

In 2011, there were many country of birth groups in the parish; those born in Africa (0.04%), "other Latin American and North American countries" (0.17%), Antigua and Barbuda (76.10%), "other Caribbean countries" (0.56%), Canada (0.27%), "other Asian countries" (0.02%), "other European countries" (0.04%), Dominica (2.93%), Dominican Republic (0.54%), Guyana (7.36%), Jamaica (3.06%), Montserrat (0.40%), St. Kitts and Nevis (0.46%), St. Lucia (0.15%), St. Vincent and the Grenadines (0.83%), Trinidad and Tobago (0.31%), the United Kingdom (0.52%), the United States (3.14%), United States Virgin Islands (0.50%), and not stated (2.58%).

== Economy ==
In 2011, 1.61% of the 2,285 workers in the parish were paid a daily salary, 44.35% were paid a weekly salary, 20.31% were paid a fortnightly salary, 30.85% were paid a monthly salary, and the remainder were paid at another time. 20.76% of workers were paid government employees, 6.74% were paid statutory body employees, 54.53% were paid private employees, 3.22% were paid private home employees, 2.63% were self-employed with paid employees, 9.96% were self-employed without paid employees, 0.89% had another worker status, and 1.27% didn't know or didn't state. Out of the 212 business owners in the parish, 28.99% made less than EC$1,000 per month from their business, 21.74% made $1,000 to $1,999, 19.81% made $2,000 to $2,999, 14.01% made $3,000 to $4,999, and 15.46% made $5,000+.

2.35% of people practiced subsistence farming.
