= Antigua and Barbuda Special Economic Zone =

- Special economic zone
- Location within Antigua
- Coordinates: 17°06′04″N 61°44′31″W
- Country: Antigua and Barbuda
- Parish: Saint Peter
- Division: Mercers Creek

Area
  - Total: 37 km^{2} (14 sq mi)
- Website: absez.ag

The Antigua and Barbuda Special Economic Zone (ABSEZ) is a special economic zone and proposed city in the Mercers Creek Division of Saint Peter, Antigua and Barbuda. Intended to become the primate city of Antigua and Barbuda, it was the brainchild of the Gaston Browne administration until its primary developer Yida Zhang was implicated in a land dispute.

Construction began in May 2015 and was intended to be completed by 2035. The development is located in the Northeast Marine Management Area and attracted international criticism for environmental and political reasons. Shortly after the groundbreaking ceremony, wide-scale clearing of lands and dredging were conducted without permission from government authorities. While a permit was eventually granted, the developer faced no consequences and many mangroves as well as an Amerindian village's remains were destroyed.

In 2023, Yida's assets were frozen by the Antigua and Barbuda High Court until he paid a US$5.4 million debt to Lux Locations. In early 2024, it was announced that the zone would be sold and amendments were made to the legislation that authorised its construction.

Now widely considered to be a failure, the United Progressive Party has called on the agreement between the government and Yida to be revoked.

On 9 August 2026, a shooting took place in the zone at Crabbs Peninsula, injuring Zhang in the chest and leaving him hospitalised.
