= Long Island (Antigua and Barbuda) =

Island off the coast of Antigua

Native name: Jumby Bay Island
- The island in 2026

- Location in Antigua and Barbuda Location in the Lesser Antilles Location in the Caribbean

Geography
- Location: Caribbean
- Coordinates: 17°09′18″N 61°45′12″W
- Archipelago: Leeward Islands, Lesser Antilles
- Area: 300 acres (120 ha)

Administration
- Antigua
- Parish: Saint George (Parish Boundaries Act), Saint Peter (census)

Demographics
- Population: 3
- Ethnic groups: White Antiguans and Barbudans 66.67%

Additional information
- Time zone: AST (UTC-4)
- Private island
- Established: 2005
- Website: Northeast Marine Management Area in Antigua and Barbuda

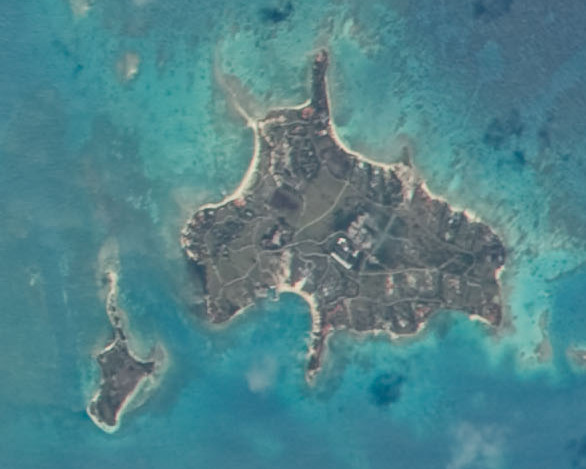
Satellite image from ISS Expedition 23

Long Island, also known as Jumby Bay, is a private island off the northeast coast of Antigua. It is located off the northern tip of the Crabbs Peninsula, about 2.5 kilometres (1.6 mi) from Dutchman Bay on Antigua. It is the fifth-largest island of Antigua and Barbuda.

The name "jumby" is derived from the Antiguan Creole word jumbee (also spelled jumbie), meaning "ghost".

== Flora and fauna ==
Hawksbill sea turtles (Eretmochelys imbricata) come from the turquoise sea to nest on the beaches of the island in Pasture Bay.

== History ==
The island was first discovered by an Italian explorer, Christopher Columbus, in 1493.

In recent years, notable residents who belong to the Jumby Bay Club, include David Sainsbury, Baron Sainsbury of Turville, Ken Follett and his wife Barbara Follett, Sir Roland Franklin (Martin E. Franklin's father), and Peter and Rex Swann.

In November 2026, Jumby Bay Island was selected as the venue for the private leaders' retreat during the 2026 Commonwealth Heads of Government Meeting, hosted by Antigua and Barbuda from 3 to 4 November. The retreat was scheduled to bring together leaders of the Commonwealth of Nations for informal discussions outside the summit's formal sessions.

== Tourism ==
Island is home to the five-star luxury hotel Jumby Bay Island, managed by Oetker Collection.

== In popular culture ==
The island was featured in a 2013 episode of Private Islands and a 2017 episode of Taboo.

== Demographics ==
Long Island has one enumeration district, ED 51305. In the 2011 census it was counted as part of Vernons.

Ethnic Groups
Q48 Ethnic	Counts	%
Caucasian/White	2	66.67%
Don't know/Not stated	1	33.33%
Total	3	100.00%

Religion
Q49 Religion	Counts	%
None/no religion	1	50.00%
Other	1	50.00%
Total	2	100.00%

Country of birth
Q58. Country of birth	Counts	%
United Kingdom	2	66.67%
Not Stated	1	33.33%
Total	3	100.00%
