= Mercers Creek Division =

Division of Antigua

Mercers Creek
- Mercers Creek Division
- Country: Antigua and Barbuda
- Parish: Saint Peter
- Village: Vernons

Government
  - MP: Rawdon Turner

Area
  - Total: 5.92 km^{2} (2.29 sq mi)

Population
  - Total: 39
  - Density: 6.6/km^{2} (17/sq mi)

Mercers Creek Division is a division of Saint Peter, Antigua and Barbuda. For census purposes, it is part of Vernons. The division is part of the Pares major division. Mercers Creek Division contains the localities of Coconut Hall and Gilbert's.

== History ==
=== Mercers Creek Estate ===
Mercers Creek Estate was put up for sale in 2016.

=== Gilbert's ===
After being exposed to John Wesley's teachings in England by his brother, Nathaniel Gilbert, Speaker of the Antiguan House of Assembly, played a significant role in introducing Methodism to Antigua and the West Indies in 1760. He educated the black people and others, and after his death in 1774, the black people he had taught kept the religion alive for many years before an English minister was dispatched. Up until help arrived, Methodism was maintained in Antigua by three of his slaves, Mary, Sophia Campbell, and Bessie Alley, together with his brother Francis, his wife, and the children's governess Mary Leadbetter. The Wesleyan Memorial Monument is located on — street, beneath St. John's. Although there isn't a headstone to identify the burial, Nathaniel Gilbert is thought to be interred at Vernons Cemetery in St. Peter's Parish.

William Gilbert, Nathaniel's son, wrote "The Hurricane," a 450-line poem with theosophical and western overtones that is set on the island of Antigua, where Gilbert was born in 1763 into a planter family. The poem was recently reissued in 1990.

Rev. Nathaniel Gilbert was contacted by Mrs. Grace Webb's estate counsel.

Deed relieving Mrs. Gilbert's estate on the island of Antigua from any interest that has accrued in the past on a specific inheritance or the £1,000 that has been charged thereon.

Gilbert's estate had 313 acres and 158 slaves in 1829. the 320 acres in 1921.

The Maginleys are an illustration of a recently immigrated family who benefited from an act. Between 1852 and 1872, two brothers named John and Robert immigrated from Ireland. Although they are not included as estate owners in the 1852 almanac, they appear in the 1872 edition. According to the legend, they initially arrived as managers or apprentice planters but soon began owning their own properties. By 1878, they had acquired about 4,500 acres through both court and private sales, making them Antigua's largest landowners. Comfort Hall, Gilbert's, Long Lane, Lavington, Lyon's, Willis Freeman's, and Burke's/LaRoche/Table Hill were among their properties, which were mostly located in the productive southeast. These had been reinforced by Cedar Hill and Sanderson's by 1891, according to the court once more, making a total of nine properties. John was a prominent figure in the plantocracy and spent twenty years on the Legislative Council in addition to serving on a number of governmental boards.

In the Eastern Caribbean islands of Antigua and Barbuda, the Gilbert Agricultural & Rural Development Center (GARDC) is situated on the storied Gilbert's Estate. The Trust of the Methodist Church in the Caribbean & The Americas owns and oversees the property (MCCA). The MCCA, the Canadian International Development Agency (CIDA)/Canada Training Awards Programme (CTAP), and the Government of Antigua-Barbuda worked together to create the GARDC Center as a two-year trial project in 1989.

=== Cocoa Nutt Hall (Crump’s) ===
On February 21, 1711, Nathaniel Crump reported that a group of French privateers had landed at his property on October last and taken fifteen slaves. He makes a payment request to the Assembly. He receives 661 pounds from the government on May 22 as payment for them.

The scheme to assassinate Nathaniel Crump and all the other white people on the island was hatched in 1729 by a gang of slaves under his ownership at Coconut Hall Plantation in St. Peter. The five ringleaders were put to death, and some of their associates were moved to nearby islands.

Attorney Nathaniel Crump served as Speaker of Antigua's Council on July 21, 1716, President of Council in 1735, and a sworn Militia member.

When the mate of the sloop "Catherine," which later belonged to Boston merchant Peter Papillon, murdered his skipper, the deed was discovered at St. John's where he went in for provisions, prompting George Crump and Samuel Redhead, who have a large sloop of 10 guns now fitting for the coast of Guinea, to offer to take back six free negroes.

Andrew Newton of London has purchased "Crump's Mountain Plantation, Crump's Windward Plantation, and Crump's Steel Plantation, all in Antigua, from George and Nathaniel Crump of Middlesex. releasing the plantations in exchange for a 300-pound payment over Mr. Newton's lifetime.

Nathaniel Crump inherited the 240-acre estate of Mercer's Creek, also known as Cocoa Nut Hall, from his uncle Dr. George Crump. Because these two estates are distinct from one another and are nearby Hawes, it is possible that they were all referred to as Mercer's Creek.

Andrew Newton of London has purchased the Antiguan plantations "Crump's Mountain Plantation," "Crump's Windward Plantation," and "Crump's Steel Plantation" from George and Nathaniel Crump of Middlesex.

The plantation included 240 acres in 1760 and 360 acres in 1769.

Family Edwards originated in Monmouth, England. Thomas Edward of Comfort Hall and Andrew Edwards of Cocoa Nut Hall were Nicholas Edwards' two sons.

- 1829: This estate had 247 acres and 145 slaves in 1829.
- According to the Antigua Almanac from 1851, John Edwards possessed 247 acres of Cocoa-Nut Hall.
- 1852: John Edwards owned Cocoa Nut Hall, which at the time covered 217 acres.
- The estate had 257 acres in 1921.

An MI or ledger bearing the following inscription can be found in the private cemetery of Coconut Hall: "Sacrect to the Memory of/Mrs. Elizabeth Edwards/Wife of Andrew Edwards Esq./ of this island who departed this Life/June 25th 1806 Aged 45 Years/also Mary Hurst Edwards/Daughter of And. & Eliz. Edwards/ who departed this Life Nov."

William Lewis Edwards (1776–1799) buried with his aunt and uncle Andrew and Elizabeth Edwards at Cocoa Nut Hall. He was the son of Cocoa Nut Hall's Thomas Edwards.

Two tiny grave markers are known to have existed:

- "July 1773 (?).... years, George Crump, Esq. passed away"
- "Geo. Crump, Esq., died October 23, 1793, at age 48"

The first blacksmith shop was located on an entire block-sized site near the intersection of Market Street and Lionel Hurst Street.

Yeamons Estate (1850s: Yeamans Estate) wrote letters to Whitehaven, England in April 1851.

"Regarding your findings regarding the number of overseers that appear to have been hired in the most recent quarter, I beg to clarify that this was mostly due to the Estate's unhealthy status. Crook and Williams, two overseers, had passed away during that time, and the Manager was unwell and unable to handle the Estate's responsibilities. Shortly after arriving at the Estate, Mr. Burrows abandoned the situation. Mr. Lake, a dependable guy, was sent to me from Cocoanut Hall to oversee the work during Mr. Frew's initial illness, and he later returned once Mr. Frew's health had improved."

As evidenced by the documents below from the Antigua Sugar Plant, Ltd., Cocoanut Hall was still manufacturing sugar in 1941. Peasants were working on nearly the same number of acres as the estate itself.

With a 32 acre estate, 30 acre farm, and 511 tons of cane delivered at a rate of 11.25 tons per acre, Coconut Hall estimated 435 tons.

Coconut Hall is an integral portion of the land that was part of the Data Tan auction and that also includes Guiana Island and other offshore islands. It is presently held by YIDA and is a component of a massive development that poses a threat to engulf the entire area.

== 2011 Demographics ==
Mercers Creek Division has one enumeration district, ED 51303.

Ethnic data for Mercers Creek
Q48 Ethnic	Counts	%
African descendent	30	76.32%
East Indian/India	5	13.16%
Mixed (other)	4	10.53%
Total	39	100.00%

Religion data for Mercers Creek
Q49 Religion	Counts	%
Adventist	7	18.42%
Anglican	7	18.42%
Evangelical	1	2.63%
Jehovah Witness	6	15.79%
None/no religion	3	7.89%
Pentecostal	7	18.42%
Rastafarian	2	5.26%
Roman Catholic	1	2.63%
Other	4	10.53%
Total	39	100.00%

Country of birth data for Mercers Creek
Q58. Country of birth	Counts	%
Antigua and Barbuda	32	81.58%
Guyana	4	10.53%
St. Kitts and Nevis	1	2.63%
US	2	5.26%
Total	39	100.00%

Country of citizenship data for Mercers Creek
Q71 Country of Citizenship 1	Counts	%
Antigua and Barbuda	37	94.74%
Guyana	2	5.26%
Total	39	100.00%

Country of second citizenship data for Mercers Creek
Q71 Country of Citizenship 2	Counts	%
Other Caribbean countries	2	25.00%
Guyana	2	25.00%
US	4	50.00%
Total	8	100.00%
NotApp :	31	
