= Long Bay, Antigua and Barbuda =

Coastal settlement in Saint Philip, Antigua

Long Bay
- Village
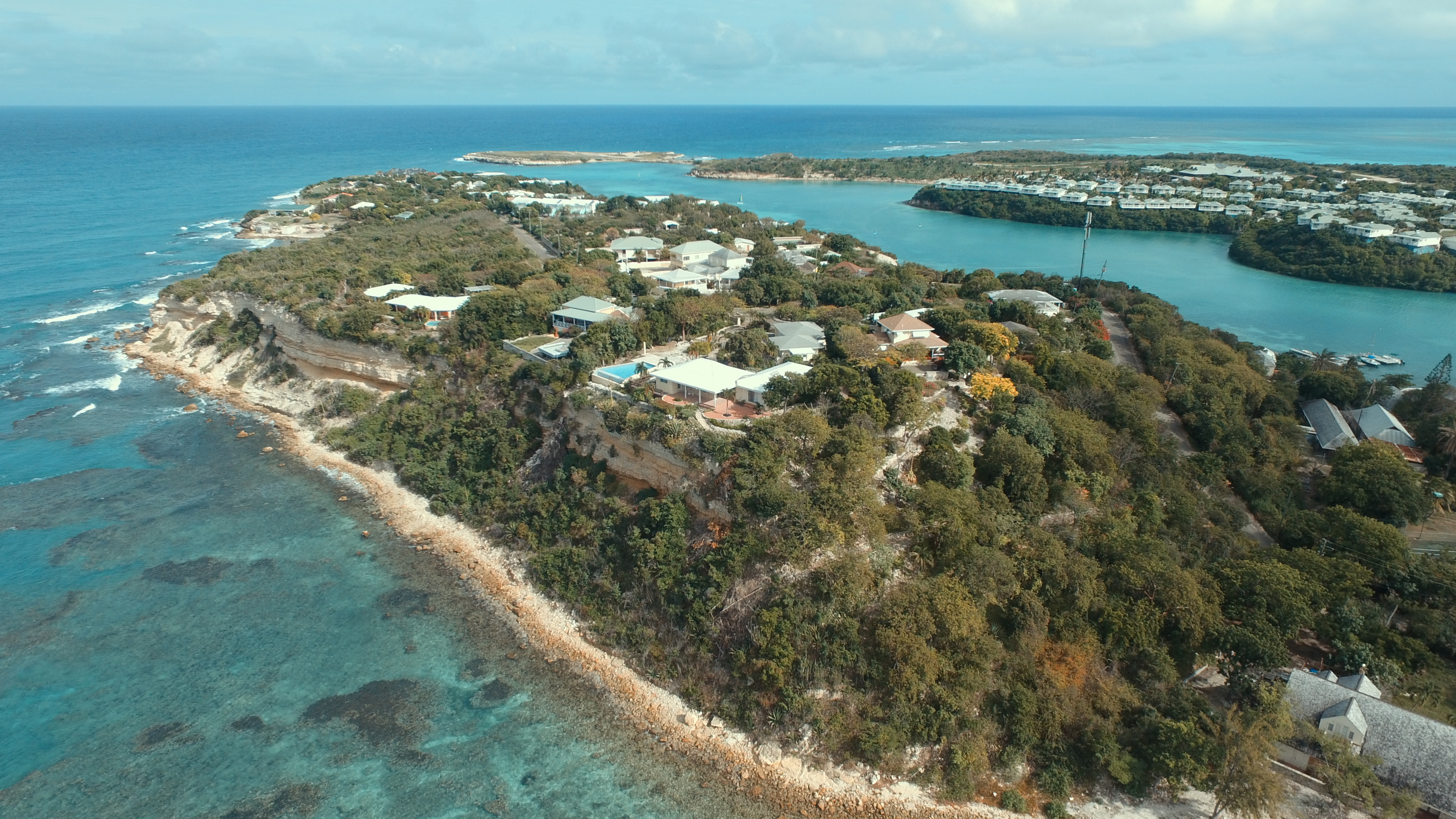
- Long Bay in 2015
- Interactive map of the Long Bay main place
- Coordinates: 17°05′49″N 61°41′22″W
- Country: Antigua and Barbuda
- Island: Antigua
- Parish: Saint Philip

Area
  - Total: 2.92 km^{2} (1.13 sq mi)

Population
  - Total: 25
  - Density: 8.6/km^{2} (22/sq mi)

Long Bay is a coastal settlement in Saint Philip, Antigua and Barbuda.

== Geography ==
Long Bay borders the Willikies-East and Willikies-North areas of Willikies. Long Bay occupies an area of 2.92 square kilometres. Devil's Bridge is located within the borders of Long Bay.

== Demographics ==
There were 25 people living in Long Bay as of the 2011 census. 61.90% was white, 33.33% were African descendants, and 4.76% were unknown. 19.05% of the population was born in Antigua and Barbuda. Other countries of birth included 'other European countries' (33.33%) and the United States (14.29%). The population had diverse religious affiliations, including 33.33% being Catholic.
