= Guiana Island (Antigua and Barbuda) =

Island off Antigua

- View of the Crabbs Peninsula and Guiana Island

- Location within Antigua and Barbuda Location within Lesser Antilles Location within the Caribbean

Geography
- Location: Caribbean Sea
- Coordinates: 17°07′21″N 61°43′47″W
- Archipelago: Leeward Islands, Lesser Antilles

Administration
- Antigua and Barbuda

Additional information
- Time zone: AST (UTC-4)

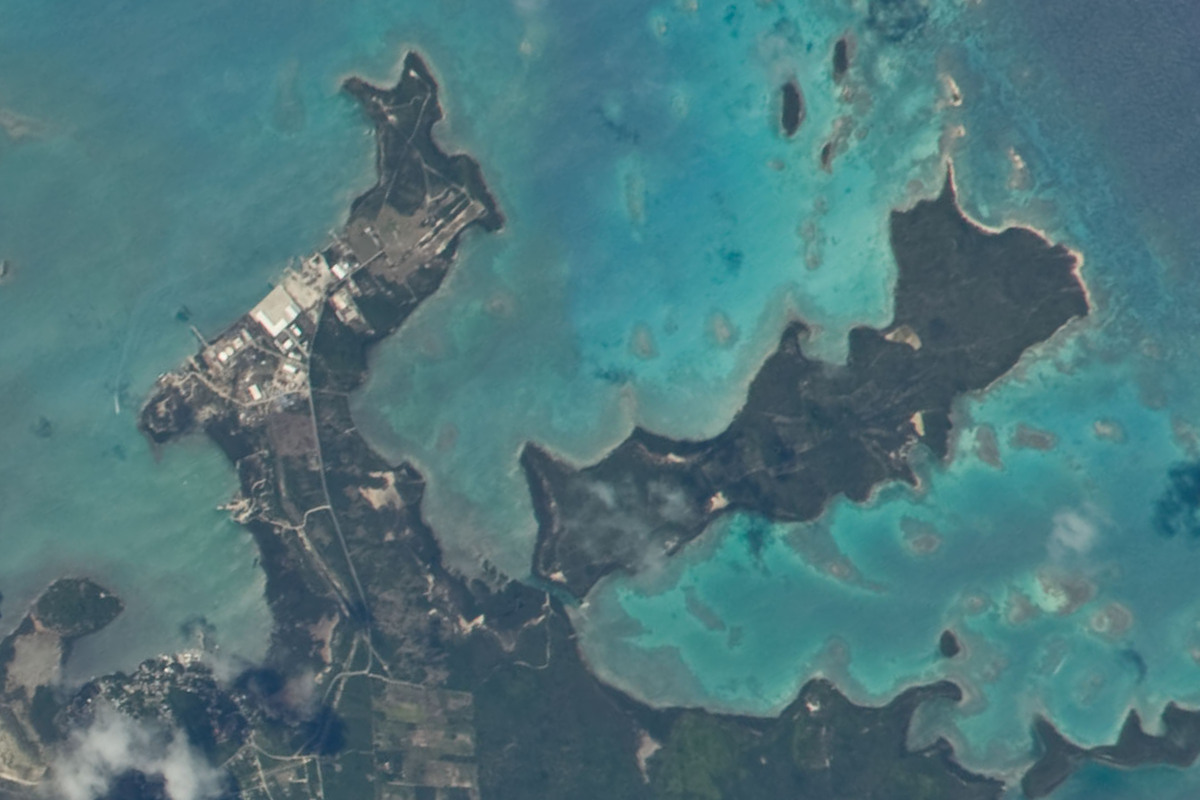
View of Guiana Island taken during ISS Expedition 23.

Guiana Island, or Guana Island, is an island off the northeast coast of Antigua, between the Parham Peninsula and Crump Island. It forms the southern coast of the North Sound, and is the fourth largest island of Antigua and Barbuda. The 2011 census recorded a permanent population of 0.

== Flora and fauna ==
Guiana is a refuge for the Fallow Deer, Antigua's national animal. The island forms part of Antigua’s Offshore Islands Important Bird Area (IBA), designated as such by BirdLife International because it supports significant populations of various bird species, including West Indian whistling-ducks, brown pelicans, laughing gulls, and least and royal terns.

== History and development ==
The name is derived from "Guiana". An estate house was built on the island in 1727. In 1856 an estate known as "Narrows and Guano Island" was home to nine people– seven men and two women in three homes. The island used to be owned by Allen Stanford, who was convicted of fraud in the United States. In 1997, Prime Minister of Antigua and Barbuda Lester Bird decided to sell the island; it was purchased for $5 million by Malaysian developer Tan Kay Hock, who planned to develop the island into a resort. The 1997 Asian financial crisis caused issues for the project, which ended up stalling after also having to face pushback from political activists and a legal battle with the Baldwin Spencer government after the latter placed of a caution on the island in 2004.

In 2008, Tan Kay Hock sold the island for $68 million to American-Antiguan financier Allen Stanford, who also wanted to see a development project on the island; however, in February 2009, United States Securities and Exchange Commission accused Stanford of running a multi-billion dollar Ponzi scheme, one which he would later be charged, convicted and handed a 110-year sentence for. The Antiguan and Barbudan government had not been aware of Stanford's purchase, only finding out after reading court filings in the Stanford case, which prompted an emergency cabinet meeting to seize the island.

In 2014, the newly elected government of Gaston Browne signed an agreement with Chinese developer Yida Zhang for a multi-million dollar project on the island and nearby areas of land as part of the Antigua and Barbuda Special Economic Zone plan. The project was promoted as way to create hundreds of jobs, but has proven controversial, with environmentalist and local activists criticizing it for the threat it poses to the local environment. As of 2026, the project remains in progress, but has led to significantly less investment in the area than planned.
