= Betty's Hope =

Former sugar plantation in Antigua

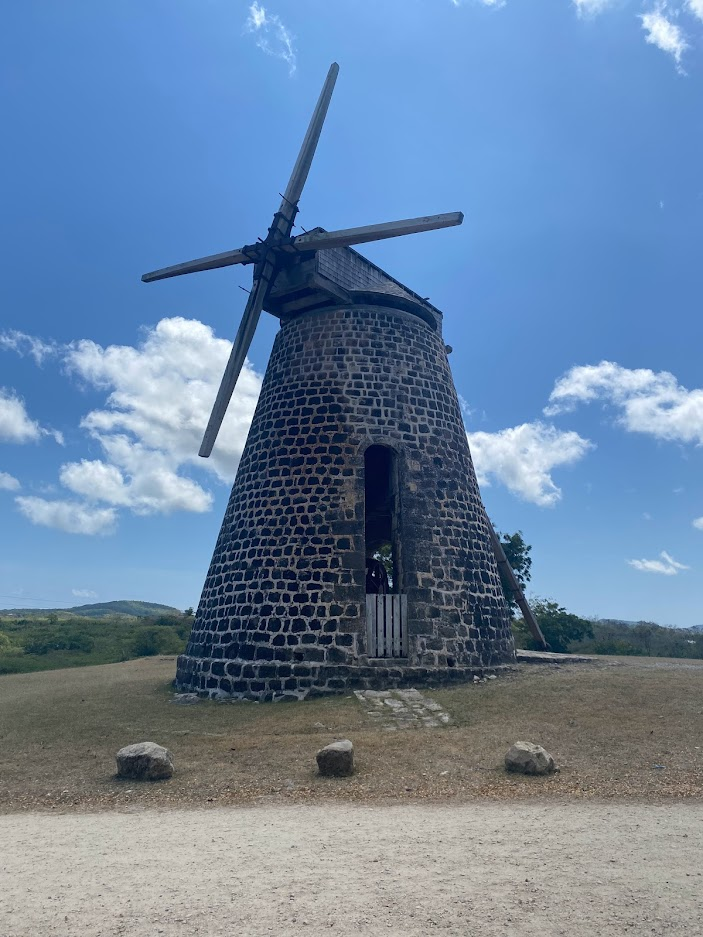
Sugar mill at Betty's Hope

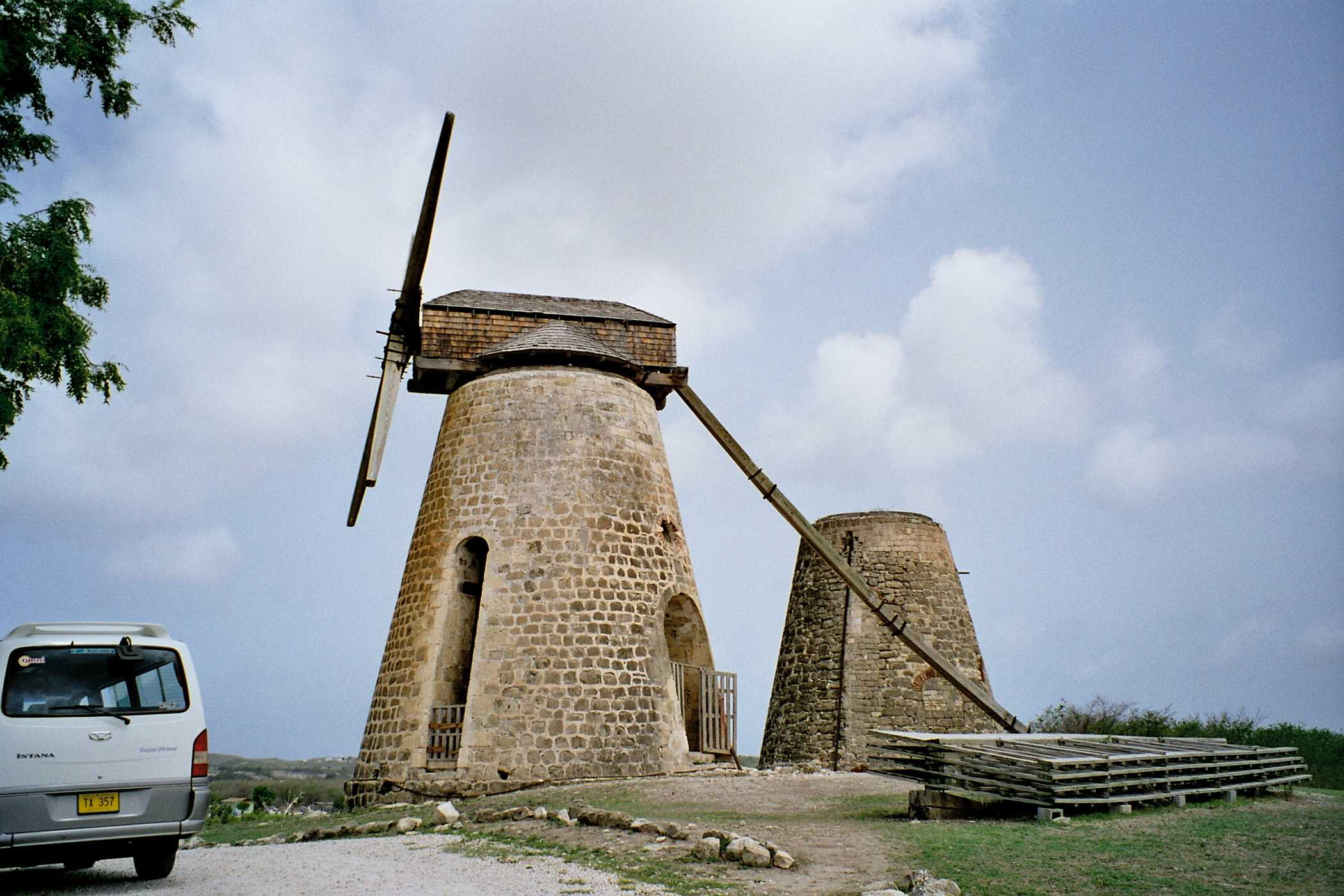
Sugar mills, Betty's Hope

Location of Betty's Hope within Antigua and Barbuda

Betty's Hope was a sugarcane plantation in Diamonds, Antigua. It was established in 1650, shortly after the island had become an English colony, and flourished as a successful agricultural industrial enterprise during the centuries of slavery. It was the first large-scale sugar plantation to operate in Antigua and belonged to the Codrington family from 1674 until 1944. Christopher Codrington, later Captain General of the Leeward Islands, acquired the property in 1674 and named it Betty's Hope, after his daughter.

Betty's Hope is no longer operational as a plantation. However, the structures pictured here at the time of restoration works initiated by the Government of Antigua and Barbuda in 1990, under the OEC/ESDU Eco-Tourism Enhancement project, consisted of the twin windmills, the Cistern Complex in serviceable condition, the Great House (Buff or Estate House) in ruins, the Boiling House where sixteen copper hoppers were used to boil cane juice to produce crystalline sugar, and the Still House, a distillery used for manufacturing rum (also seen in ruins without a roof but with elegant arches). Since 1995, the buildings have been developed as an open-air museum with a visitor center and are managed by the Museum of Antigua and Barbuda. The museum has designated the site as a Historical Site of Antigua and Barbuda.

== Geography ==
Betty's Hope estate is in a rural area where the geological formation, in a rolling landscape, is limestone. Its location is at 17°04′51.42″N 61°44′44.49″W, to the south of the town of Pares.

== History ==
History of the sugar plantation at Betty's Hope is traced to the early 1650s when Governor Christopher Keynell founded it in Antigua. After his death, his wife inherited the estate, in 1663. However, in 1666 she abandoned it, during the French occupation of the islands. The English recaptured the island and decided to award the estate, in 1674, to the Codrington family who were then resident in Barbados, as the government considered the earlier owners to have been disloyal to the Crown, having deserted the estate before the French occupied the island.

Under the ownership of the Codringtons, the emphasis centered on sugar, following the earlier dominance of tobacco, indigo, and ginger crops in Antigua.

The Codrington owners distinguished themselves by ensuring that Betty's Hope was developed and functioned as the most efficient large-scale sugar estate in Antigua. Two of their family members had the distinction of holding posts of the Governor General of the Leeward Islands between 1689 and 1704; even subsequently the members of the family also had their name established as one of the most influential and prosperous planters during the colonial rule. The estate was managed by a few Europeans, but the basic hard skilled and unskilled labour force was provided by the African slaves, which brought accolades to the estate (and then known as the "flagship estate of Antigua"); the slaves were later emancipated in 1834 and they continued to serve the estate as freed labour. The Codringtons had 150 sugar mills in Antigua, of which Betty's Hope was the first one where they had introduced technology innovations and ideas to carry out large scale cultivation, extraction and manufacture of sugar. In 1680, there were 393 slaves working on the estate. However, from 1921, sugarcane was extracted at the Central Sugar Factory, even though the Betty's Hope sugar mill was functional. After the Codrington family returned to England, the estate was managed by attorneys, till the early 1900s. In 1944, Betty's Hope was sold by the Codringtons to the Antigua Sugar Estates Ltd.

The reasons for discarding the windmill technology for cane juice extraction was the introduction of steam. Consequent to this change, the machinery in the windmill was shifted to the boiling house complex and reinstalled next to the new steam engines. The buildings, however, became storerooms for scrap iron and other debris. As result, the Antiguan economy is no more sugar centric but is now more dependent on tourism, and Betty's Hope now remains a part of this economy.

== Extraction process ==
In the 18th century (1737 as per a plaque at the main entrance), at Betty's Hope, twin windmills were used to crush sugar cane. Initially, the windmills had three vertical rollers to crush the cane fed by two men and it could crush and extract only 60% of cane juice even after two rounds of crushing. This process underwent improvements with three horizontally placed rollers which increased the efficiency of extraction by another 20%. Each wind driven mill extracted cane juice from cane produced from 2 acres (0.81 ha) of land and carted to the mill. The extracted juice was collected in an underground collection chamber from where it was conveyed through a pipe to the boiling house. The bagasse was dried and used as fuel in the boiler and distilling process. The weekly production was generally about 5,500 gallons of cane juice from 200 tonnes of cane.

== Conservation ==
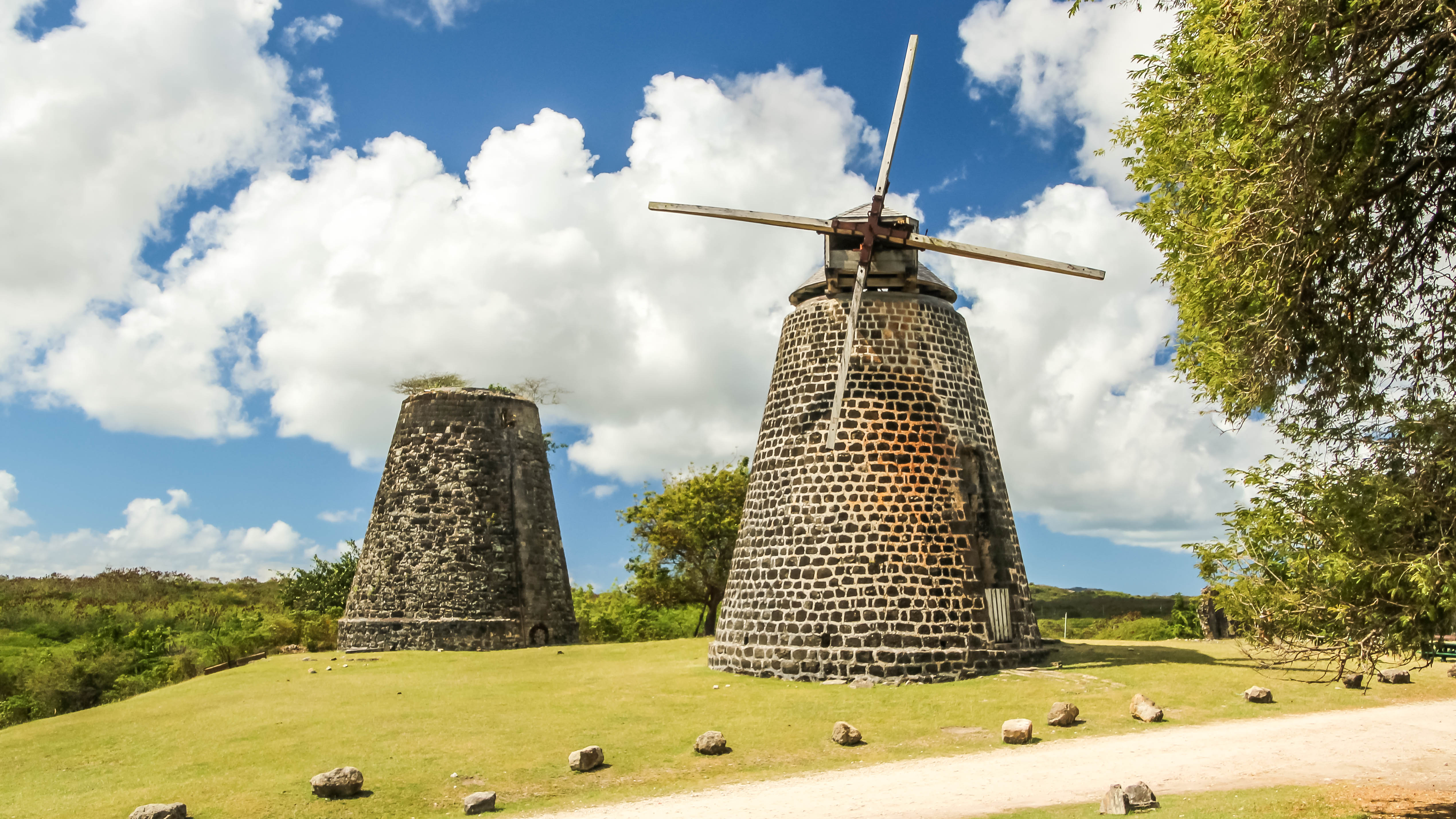
One of the two restored windmills fixed with the sails

A programme of restoration of the heritage status of the Betty's Hope estate, as a major West Indian heritage monument, was initially started by "The Friends of Betty's Hope", between 1987 and 1990, which eventually was institutionalised as a trust called the "Betty's Hope Trust", in 1990. The objective was to develop it as an open-air museum and also an interpretation center to bring out the profound influence that the estate had "in Antigua and Barbuda's history and influenced the lives of many generations of Antiguans." For this purpose, a committee was set up in 1987–90. Restoration work was started in 1990 and completed in 1995.

The Organisation of Eastern Caribbean States (OECS) and the Environmental Sustainable Development Unit (ESDU) launched the Eco-Tourism Enhancement project with a grant support in collaboration with the Government of Antigua and Barbuda to perpetuate the principles of environmental sustainability.

One of the two wind mills, cane crushing machinery and sails were restored. The visitor center museum is now located in an old cotton house store room where exhibits of plantation's history with estate plans, pictures and maps, artefacts and a model of the central site are displayed.

During May 2005, funds were raised for restoration of Betty's Hope by organising a concert called "A Penny Concert." The mill was refurbished and the sails of the first windmill were reinstalled in 1995. After recommissioning of the mill, it is run for demonstration purposes on special occasions, since the stone mill walls are old and fragile. However, the sails are kept mounted all through the year. Following the restoration, the Betty's Hope project won the "5th Ann. Islands Eco-Tourism Award" in 1995. On 28 January 2005, the Eco-Enhancement Upgrade of Betty's Hope was also launched.

== Archaeological excavations ==
Archaeological research to establish the archaeology of the early colonial period has been initiated at Betty's Hope by the City University New York, Brooklyn. Research had been carried out before and during restoration also, which revealed the operational pattern of the mill. It was established that cane juice produced after milling was not directly led to the boiling-house but was collected at a large iron tank located below the rollers from where it was then pumped to the boiling-house for further processing. Since 2007, excavations by California State University, Chico, have focused on the area of the Great House to correlate the Great House as well as other surrounding buildings, to the site maps recorded in the Codrington Papers. Excavations from 2012 to 2014 have concentrated on the rum distillery and one of the slave villages.

== Bibliography ==
- Scott, C. R. (ed.) (2005) Insight guide: Caribbean (5th edition). London: Apa Publications.
