= Mary, Sophia and Bessie =

Antiguan slaves and missionaries

Mary Alley, Sophia Campbell and Bessie were three enslaved women who lived in Antigua during the 18th century. In 1758, the women were baptised by John Wesley, the founder of Methodism alongside their slave owner, Nathaniel Gilbert, while visiting London. Upon returning to Antigua in 1760, the women began preaching alongside Gilbert to the island's population, and were credited with maintaining Methodism in Antigua between Gilbert's death in 1774 and the arrival of Methodist missionaries in 1778.

== Early lives in Antigua ==
Little is known of the women's early lives or personal lives, with their biographies described as "incomplete". It is understood that the women were enslaved and sold to the Gilbert family, a prominent English family living in Antigua (then part of the British Leeward Islands), where they owned a plantation with three hundred slaves. Nathaniel Gilbert, the slave owner, was a lawyer who had trained at Gray's Inn in London before moving to Antigua, where he became the Speaker of the House of Representatives.

Sophia has been described as a "Negro" in records from the time, a term used at the time to refer to black people. Mary was described as a "mulatto" in John Wesley's diary, a term used to refer to people of mixed European and black ancestry. Wesley's diary making a distinction between "two Negro servants... and a mulatto" has led to it being understand that Bessie was also a black woman. While all three women are variously described as being slaves belonging to the Gilbert family, some sources make mention of Sophia and Mary as "free women"; it is unclear whether this refers to their time on the Gilbert plantation, or after the deaths of Nathaniel and Francis Gilbert in 1774 and 1779, respectively. Bessie is consistently described as a slave in the historical record.

== Travel to London and conversion to Methodism ==
In 1757, Gilbert travelled to the United Kingdom, with two or three of his slaves, most commonly identified as being Mary, Sophia and Bessie, though some sources suggest that Bessie did not accompany them on the trip. The purpose of Gilbert's trip was to receive medical treatment and also to meet John Wesley, the founder of Methodism, with Gilbert's brother Francis having recently converted to the faith. Wesley is understood to have first preached to Gilbert on 17 January 1758 at Gilbert's home in Wandsworth. Wesley later recorded in his diary that among the audience had been "two Negro servants of [Gilbert] and a mulatto", whom he described as being "very much awakened" by his preaching, and noting their names as being Mary, Sophia and Bessie.

Later that year, on 29 November 1758, Wesley visited Gilbert's home again; in his diary, he noted that he had baptised "two Negroes belonging to Mr. Gilbert". Wesley noted that one of the women had been "deeply convinced of sin", while the other had "rejoiced in God her Saviour"; Wesley described the latter woman as being the first "African Christian" he had met, and later describes them both as "heathens". Mary, Sophia and Bessie are understood to have converted to Methodism from another religion, though it is unclear if this was an African traditional religion, Islam, or another denomination of Christianity.

== Return to Antigua and preaching of Methodism ==
At an unspecified date, and no later than 1760, Mary, Sophia and Bessie returned to Antigua alongside Gilbert. Gilbert began preaching Methodism to his friends and acquaintances on the island, as well as to his slaves from the steps of his plantation. Notably, Mary, Sophia and Bessie, alongside Gilbert's wife and his governess, Mary Leadbeater, were understood to have travelled around the island to share information about Methodism.

By 1766, a Methodist society had been formed in Antigua. The society was notably multicultural, due largely to the large number of slaves who became Methodist; it was retrospectively described as the "birthplace of black Methodism". The community in Antigua was initially not commissioned or authorised by Wesley, and was understood to have started organically by the conversations of the Gilberts, Mary, Sophia and Bessie. This marked the first Methodist community to be established outside of Great Britain.

== Death of Gilbert and unofficial leadership of the Methodist movement ==
At the time of Gilbert's death in 1774, there were around 200 Methodists living in Antigua, many of whom were slaves. Gilbert was reported to have instructed his brother Francis, Leadbeater (who had married Francis in 1767), and Mary, Sophia and Bessie, to keep Methodism alive on the island from his deathbed. Francis initially took over leadership of the community, but left a vacuum in 1776 after he and Leadbeater returned to the United Kingdom due to his ill health.

Mary, Sophia and Bessie are commonly believed to have taken unofficial leadership of the Methodist community in Antigua after the Gilberts left the island. While membership did fall, the women were credited with "tending to the spiritual needs of the flock" by leading prayers and study sessions. They have been credited with the establishment of the first Methodist chapel in St. John's, though their exact role in its construction has been debated. The women are understood to have raised funds to purchase land for the church, and supported with its construction by clearing the land and transporting stone and marl, primarily by hand. They were assisted as Methodist leaders by the return of Mary Leadbeater to Antigua following Francis' death.

In 1778, after numerous appeals from the Antiguan community, a Methodist missionary, John Baxter, arrived on Antigua; another minister, Thomas Coke, arrived by chance following a shipwreck in 1786.

Following the arrival of Baxter in 1778, Mary, Sophia and Bessie are understood to have largely relinquished their leadership roles of the Methodist community.

== Recognition ==
Mary, Sophia and Bessie's role in spreading Methodism in Antigua are commemorated in a plaque at the Gilbert Memorial Chapel in St. John's.

The Jamaica District of the Methodist Church in the Caribbean and the Americas stated that "West Indian Methodism must ever preserve the names of a Negress and a Mulatto", arguing that Methodism would have died off in Antigua following the death of Gilbert and the emigration of his brother, without the work of Mary, Sophia, and Bessie to preserve the faith.
