= Seatons =

- Village
- Interactive map of the Seatons main place
- Coordinates: 17°05′42″N 61°43′30″W
- Country: Antigua and Barbuda
- Island: Antigua
- Civil parish: Saint Philip Parish

Government
  - Type: Village Council (possibly dissolved)

Population (2011)
  - Total: 457
- Time zone: UTC-4 (AST)

Seatons is a village in Saint Philip Parish, located on eastern Antigua island in Antigua and Barbuda.

== Geography ==
Seatons is located to the west of Willkie's, close to the island's northeastern coast.

Crump Island lies immediately to the north of Seatons.

== Demographics ==
Seatons has two enumeration districts.

- 61100 Seatons-Central
- 61200 Seatons-Coastal

=== Census data (2011) ===
Q48 Ethnic	Counts	%
African descendent	395	86.38%
Caucasian/White	12	2.57%
Mixed (Black/White)	2	0.51%
Mixed (Other)	19	4.11%
Hispanic	2	0.51%
Syrian/Lebanese	2	0.51%
Other	12	2.57%
Don't know/Not stated	13	2.83%
Total	457	100.00%

Q49 Religion	Counts	%
Adventist	112	25.47%
Anglican	100	22.79%
Baptist	5	1.07%
Church of God	9	2.14%
Jehovah Witness	8	1.88%
Methodist	64	14.48%
Moravian	11	2.41%
None/no religion	24	5.36%
Pentecostal	27	6.17%
Rastafarian	2	0.54%
Roman Catholic	32	7.24%
Wesleyan Holiness	13	2.95%
Other	14	3.22%
Don't know/Not stated	19	4.29%
Total	439	100.00%
NotApp :	19	

Q58. Country of birth	Counts	%
Antigua and Barbuda	309	67.61%
Other Caribbean countries	1	0.26%
Canada	4	0.77%
Other Asian countries	6	1.29%
Other European countries	1	0.26%
Dominica	8	1.80%
Dominican Republic	2	0.51%
Guyana	6	1.29%
Jamaica	26	5.66%
St. Lucia	1	0.26%
St. Vincent and the Grenadines	2	0.51%
Trinidad and Tobago	4	0.77%
United Kingdom	2	0.51%
USA	25	5.40%
USVI United States Virgin Islands	1	0.26%
Not Stated	59	12.85%
Total	457	100.00%

Q71 Country of Citizenship 1	Counts	%
Antigua and Barbuda	359	78.41%
Other Caribbean countries	2	0.51%
Canada	4	0.77%
Other Asian and Middle Eastern countries	4	0.77%
Dominica	1	0.26%
Dominican Republic	1	0.26%
Guyana	1	0.26%
Jamaica	14	3.08%
St. Lucia	1	0.26%
St. Vincent and the Grenadines	1	0.26%
Trinidad and Tobago	2	0.51%
United Kingdom	2	0.51%
USA	6	1.29%
Other countries	1	0.26%
Not Stated	58	12.60%
Total	457	100.00%

Q71 Country of Citizenship 2 (Country of Second Citizenship)	Counts	%
Other Caribbean countries	1	2.00%
Canada	9	16.00%
Dominica	7	12.00%
Guyana	4	6.00%
Jamaica	9	16.00%
St. Vincent and the Grenadines	1	2.00%
Trinidad and Tobago	1	2.00%
USA	24	40.00%
Other countries	2	4.00%
Total	59	100.00%
NotApp :	399	

Employment status	Counts	%
Employed	191	52.94%
Unemployed	15	4.25%
Inactive	149	41.50%
Not stated	5	1.31%
Total	360	100.00%
NotApp :	98	

Q55 Internet Use	Counts	%
Yes	223	48.84%
No	234	51.16%
Total	457	100.00%

Q91 Business Earning (Earnings a business made)	Counts	%
Under 1,000 $EC per month	1	7.69%
1,000 to 1,999 $EC per month	1	7.69%
2,000 to 2,999 $EC per month	4	23.08%
3,000 to 4,999 $EC per month	2	15.38%
5,000 $EC and over per month	7	46.15%
Total	15	100.00%
NotApp :	437	
Missing :	5	

Q117 MoneyOverseas (Money from friends and relatives overseas)	Counts	%
Under 100 EC$	357	99.35%
500 to 999 EC$	1	0.33%
1,000 to 1,999 EC$	1	0.33%
Total	360	100.00%
NotApp :	98	

== Notable people from Seatons Village ==
- Dame Gwendolyn Tonge (1923–2012) Senator, Women's Desk supervisor, "Auntie Gwen" television personality

== See also ==
- Category:Antigua
