= Diamonds, Antigua and Barbuda =

Diamonds
- Village
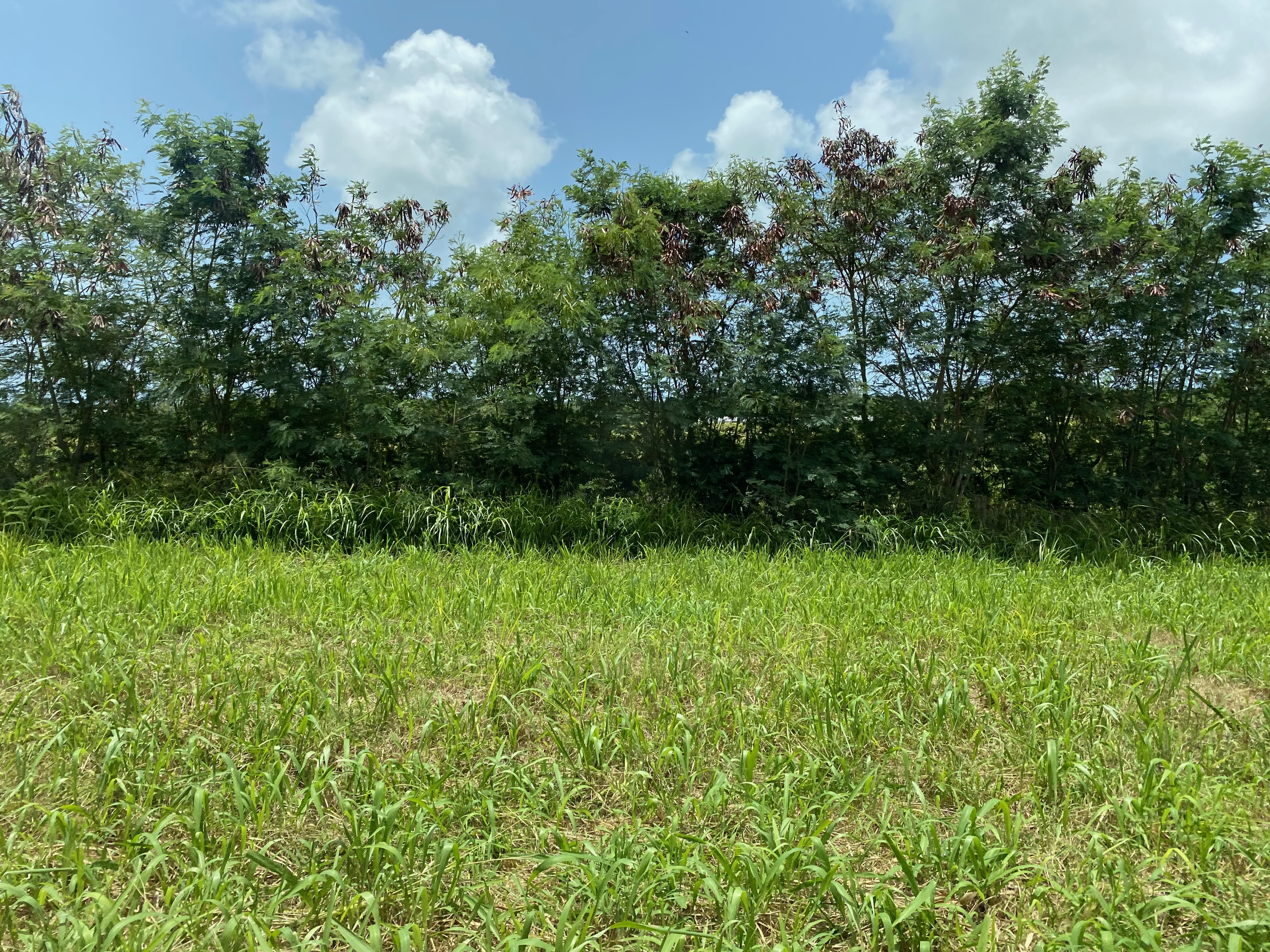
- A field in Diamonds
- Interactive map of the Diamonds main place
- Location within Antigua and Barbuda
- Country: Antigua and Barbuda
- Island: Antigua
- Civil parish: Saint Peter

Government
  - Type: Village Council (possibly dissolved)
  - MP: Rawdon Turner

Area
  - Total: 10.12 km^{2} (3.91 sq mi)

Population (2011)
  - Total: 57
  - Density: 5.6/km^{2} (15/sq mi)
- Time zone: UTC-4 (AST)

Diamonds is a rural area in Saint Peter, Antigua and Barbuda. Diamonds is home to Betty's Hope, the main tourist attraction in the parish.

Hamlets in the village include Blackouts (17°04′26.31″N 61°45′53.54″W). Blackouts is located in a small forest in the otherwise flat agricultural region of southern Saint Peter. The locality receives its name from the Blackout Cultural Park in the centre of the area. The locality can be accessed by Lyons Hill Road. Blackouts is an officially recognised locality by the Antigua and Barbuda Electoral Commission. It is about a kilometre south of Pares.

== History ==
=== Diamonds Estate (Mill) ===
The adjoining cattle corral is still standing, and the mill is in "good" condition. The house was modest in size compared to many estate homes, but it was constructed with 2 to 3 inch thick walls. It had two levels and was made of stone, with the ground floor being utilized for storage. In addition to from the kitchen into a walled courtyard, stairs led up to the front and back of the house. The gardens on each side of the front were large enough to accommodate an open garden seating area that could be accessed directly from the living room and provided an elevated perspective of the land. It was a remarkably strong and compact building designed for security. A tennis court and bench were located on the front lawn, where family and friends could play pleasant matches under the shade of a Scarlet Cordia tree. The surrounding area was extremely flat and arable. Cochran's (#83), Sanderson's (#86), Duer's (#89), and Parry's (#88) are nearby estates. When the Syndicate Estates failed, the government took control of Diamond Estate and converted it into an agricultural farm. After being out of use in 2001, the government brought it back in 2007.

=== Territorial evolution ===
- 1700 - 122 acres
- 1755 - 126 acres
- 1829 - 134 acres
- 1941 - 167 acres

== Demographics ==
Diamonds has one enumeration district, ED 51400.

Diamonds had 84 slaves in 1829, when it was sized at 134 acres.

=== Census data (2011) ===
Q48 Ethnic	Counts	%
African descendent	45	78.57%
Caucasian/White	8	14.29%
East Indian/India	4	7.14%
Total	57	100.00%

Q49 Religion	Counts	%
Adventist	6	10.71%
Anglican	7	12.50%
Church of God	3	5.36%
Methodist	7	12.50%
Moravian	1	1.79%
None/no religion	17	30.36%
Pentecostal	5	8.93%
Roman Catholic	2	3.57%
Other	6	10.71%
Don't know/Not stated	2	3.57%
Total	57	100.00%

Q58. Country of birth	Counts	%
Antigua and Barbuda	32	55.36%
Other European countries	1	1.79%
Dominica	3	5.36%
Guyana	14	25.00%
Jamaica	2	3.57%
Trinidad and Tobago	1	1.79%
United Kingdom	3	5.36%
USA	1	1.79%
Total	57	100.00%

Q71 Country of Citizenship 1	Counts	%
Antigua and Barbuda	44	76.79%
Dominica	1	1.79%
Guyana	7	12.50%
Jamaica	1	1.79%
United Kingdom	1	1.79%
USA	2	3.57%
Other countries	1	1.79%
Total	57	100.00%

Q71 Country of Citizenship 2 (Country of Second Citizenship)	Counts	%
Dominica	2	13.33%
Guyana	7	46.67%
St. Lucia	1	6.67%
United Kingdom	5	33.33%
Total	15	100.00%
NotApp :	42	

Q55 Internet Use	Counts	%
Yes	35	60.71%
No	22	37.50%
Don't know/Not stated	1	1.79%
Total	57	100.00%

Employment status	Counts	%
Employed	37	72.00%
Unemployed	2	4.00%
Inactive	12	24.00%
Total	51	100.00%
NotApp :	6	

Q117 MoneyOverseas (Money from friends and relatives overseas)	Counts	%
Under 100 EC$	51	100.00%
Total	51	100.00%
NotApp :	6	

Q91 Business Earning (Earnings a business made)	Counts	%
Under $1,000 EC per month	5	38.46%
1,000 to $1,999 EC per month	1	7.69%
2,000 to $2,999 EC per month	3	23.08%
3,000 to $4,999 EC per month	1	7.69%
$5,000 EC and over per month	3	23.08%
Total	13	100.00%
NotApp :	44	
