= Crabbs Peninsula =

Coordinates: 17.127°N 61.755°W

Crabbs Peninsula and Guiana Island in 2024

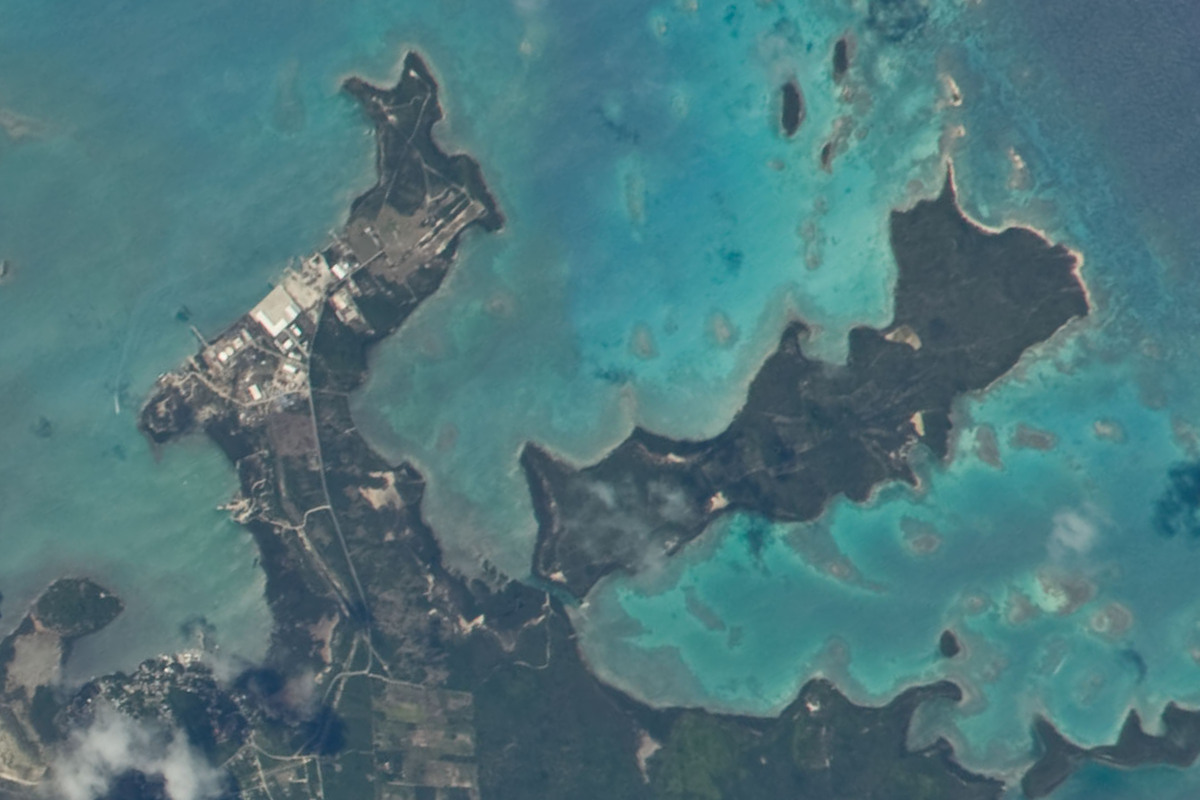
View of the peninsula (left) taken during ISS Expedition 23.

Crabbs Peninsula is a long narrow finger of land which extends from the northeast coast of Antigua. It lies between Long Island and Guana Island, the fourth and fifth largest islands of Antigua and Barbuda. The small settlement of Parham lies close to the base of the peninsula.

== Naval Base Crabbs ==
In 1941, Crabbs Peninsula was leased for 99 years to the US Military, due to World War II in the Destroyers-for-bases deal. A United States Navy Station was built with a camp for United States Marine Corps and United States Coast Guard. The Naval Air Station construction started on 17 March 1941 and improvement ended in 1943. After the war in 1945, the base was closed. The Navy dredged a channel near Maiden Island on the south side of the base for shipping. The dredge made two small islands. During the war the station had one patrol squadron of seaplanes with a seaplane tender. The station was built by civilian workers.

== Demographics ==
Crabbs Peninsula has one enumeration district, ED 51304.

Crabbs is considered to be part of Vernons for census purposes.

The enumeration district has an area of 2.36 square kilometers.

Ethnic Data for Crabbs, Antigua and Barbuda
Q48 Ethnic	Counts	%
African descendent	7	100.00%
Total	7	100.00%

Religion Data for Crabbs, Antigua and Barbuda
Q49 Religion	Counts	%
Anglican	1	14.29%
Evangelical	5	71.43%
Weslyan Holiness	1	14.29%
Total	7	100.00%

Country of birth data for Crabbs, Antigua and Barbuda
Q58. Country of birth	Counts	%
Antigua and Barbuda	7	100.00%
Total	7	100.00%

Country of Citizenship Data for Crabbs, Antigua and Barbuda
Q71 Country of Citizenship 1	Counts	%
Antigua and Barbuda	7	100.00%
Total	7	100.00%

Country of Second Citizenship Data for Crabbs, Antigua and Barbuda
Q71 Country of Citizenship 2	Counts	%
USA	1	100.00%
Total	1	100.00%
NotApp :	6	

== See also ==
- Waller Air Force Base in center of Trinidad
- Bombardment of Curaçao
- US Naval Advance Bases
- United States Naval Forces Southern Command
