= Maiden Island (Antigua and Barbuda) =

Island in Antigua and Barbuda

- Location within Antigua and Barbuda Location within Lesser Antilles Location within the Caribbean

Geography
- Location: Caribbean
- Coordinates: 17°08′40″N 61°45′48″W
- Archipelago: Leeward Islands, Lesser Antilles

Administration
- Antigua and Barbuda

Additional information
- Time zone: AST (UTC-4)
Private island
Northeast coast. Marine Reserve.
- Interactive map of Northeast coast. Marine Reserve.
- Established: 2005
- Website: Northeast Marine Management Area in Antigua and Barbuda

Location of Maiden Island within Antigua and Barbuda.

Maiden Island, also known as "Maid Island" or "Maiden Islet," is a small private island which is part of the independent nation of Antigua and Barbuda. The 2011 census recorded a population of 0.

The island contains a total of ten moorings, making it a popular tourist destination for those who enjoy the warm waters of the Caribbean Sea.

The Hall family owns Maiden Island West, a small private island in Antigua and Barbuda. The island has one permanent dwelling structure.

Maiden Island is the site for the largest coral reef restoration project performed with designed artificial reefs called "Reef Balls".

In 2004, approximately 3,500 prefabricated reef modules were deployed on all sides of the island but the primary reef was created on the windward side and was heavily planted with propagated and rescued coral and other marine life. There were more than 10,000 propagated coral fragments planted on the Reef Balls by the Reef Ball Foundation, a public non-profit NGO that does reef restoration work worldwide.

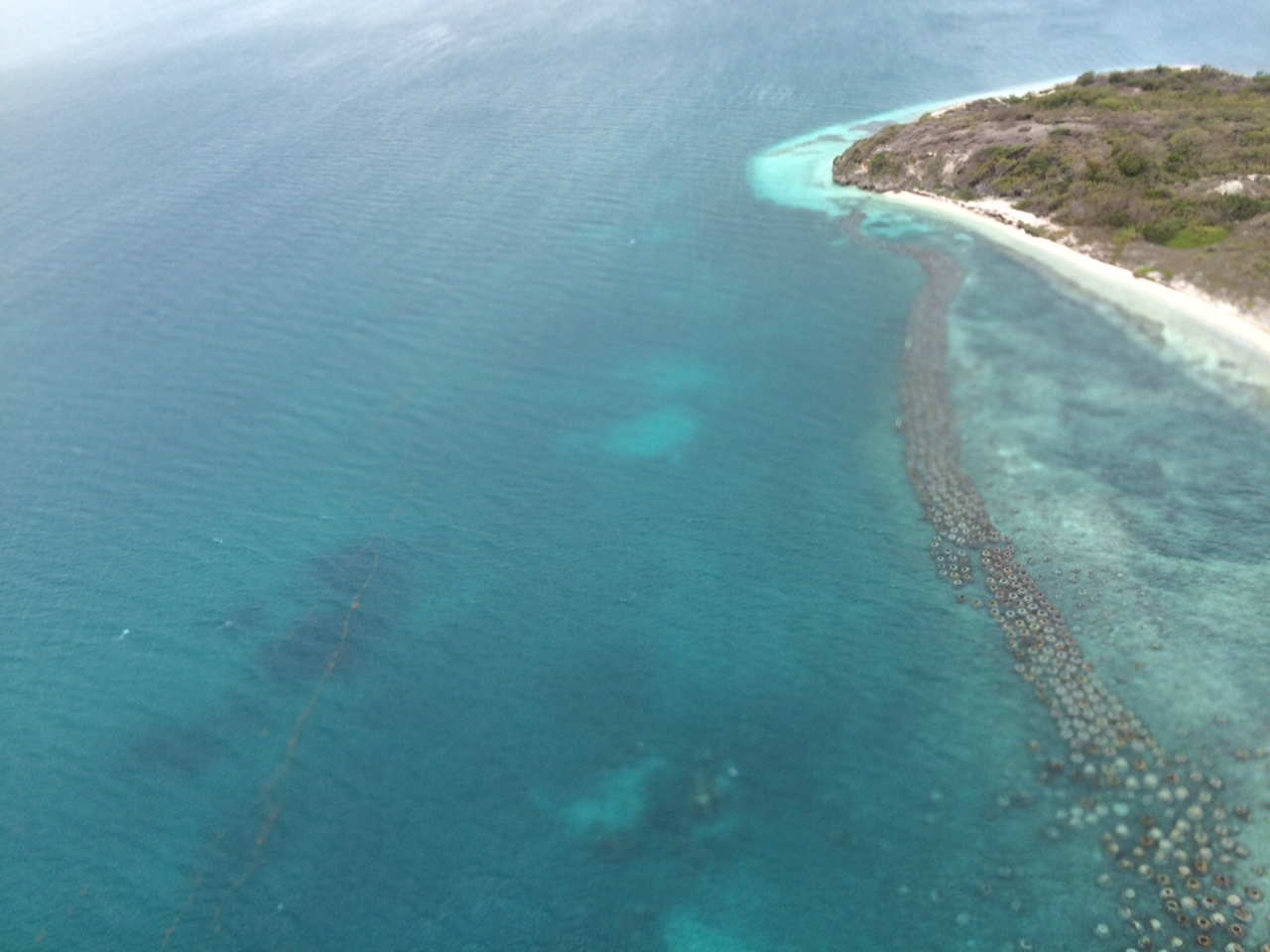
Reef Balls on the windward side of Maiden Island planted heavily with propagated and rescued coral.
