= Pares, Antigua and Barbuda =

Pares
- Village
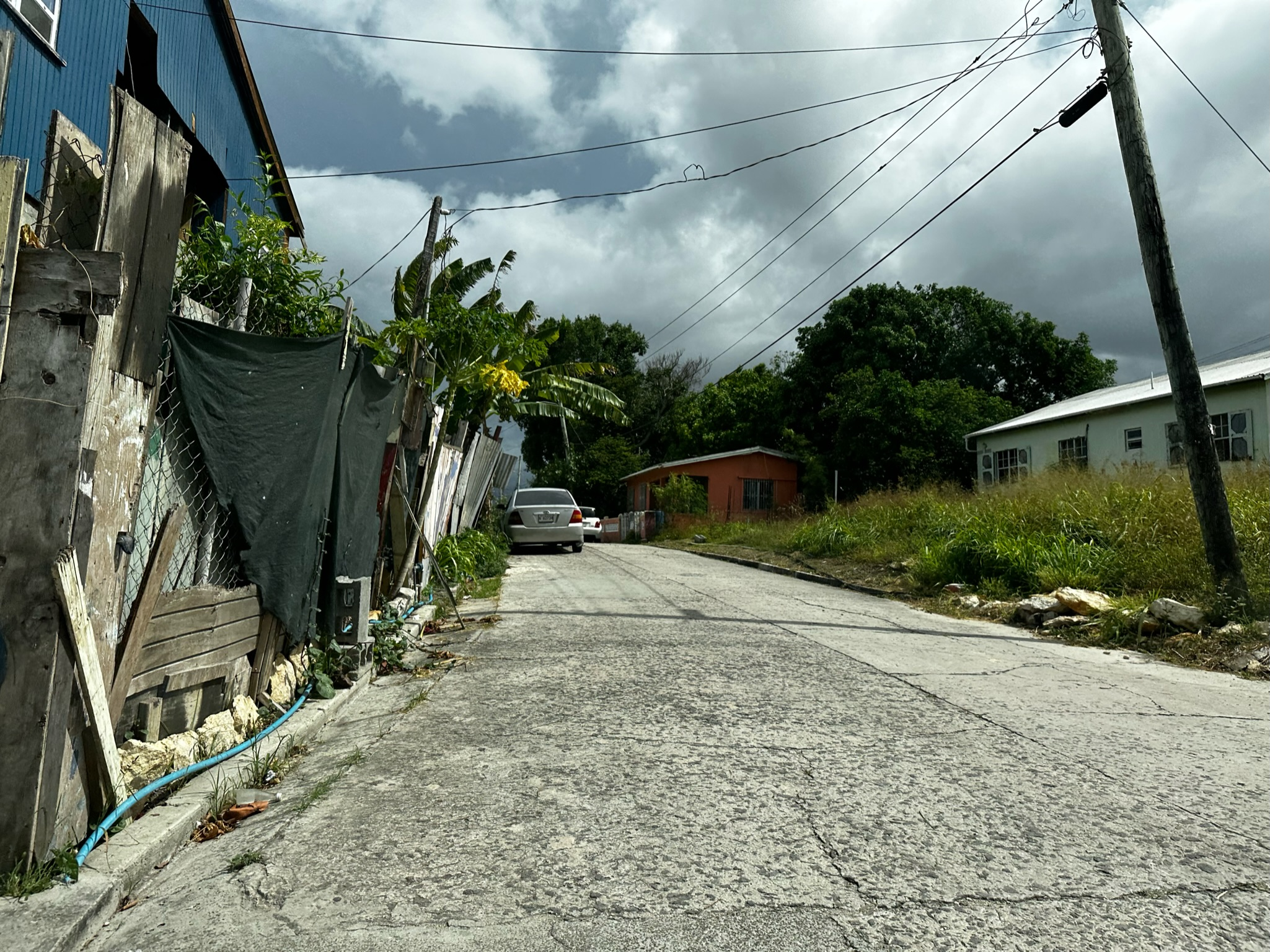
- Pares East #1 neighbourhood in 2023
- Interactive map of the Pares main place
- Location within Antigua and Barbuda
- Coordinates: 17°05′N 61°45′W
- Country: Antigua and Barbuda
- Island: Antigua
- Civil parish: Saint Peter
- Major division: Pares
- Established: 1750
- Founder: John Pare

Government
  - MP: Rawdon Turner

Area
  - Total: 0.56 km^{2} (0.22 sq mi)

Population (2011)
  - Total: 575
  - Density: 1,026.8/km^{2} (2,659/sq mi)
- Time zone: UTC-4 (AST)

Pares is a small village in central Antigua. it is located to the north of Potworks Dam and south of the town of Parham on the Sir Robin Yearwood Highway between Vernons and Willikies.

== History ==
=== Sugar ===
John Pare owned 153 acres and died in 1757. Rachel Warner, the wife of Ashton Warner (d. 1789) held 153 acres in 1803 and was the daughter of John Pare. The slave registration listed 13 children, 89 women, and 63 men in 1787. Samuel Otto-Baijer, member of council and chief baron of Court of Exchequer, was born in Pares on 1 May 1782, and died in Philadelphia on 20 December 1835, at the age of 54. Pares estate was established by John Pare in 1750.

== Neighbourhoods ==
Pares has three enumeration districts, Pares East #1 (51101), Pares East #2 (51102), and Pares West (51200).

=== Pares (West) ===
Pares West has an area of 0.2 square kilometres. There are 200 individuals total in Pares West. 72.82% of the population of Pares West is African descendant, 11.79% is other mixed, 8.72% is mixed Black/White, 4.10% of the population is Indian, 1.54% of the population didn't know or didn't state their ethnicity, and 1.03% of the population is Hispanic. 73.33% of the population of Pares West was born in Antigua and Barbuda, 12.82% was born in Guyana, 4.62% was born in Jamaica, and 4.10% of the population was born in the United States. The rest of the population were born in various other countries in the Americas, or in the United Kingdom. The largest religious denomination in Pares West was Pentecostalism, making up 33.85% of the population. The next largest religious denomination in Pares West was Anglicanism, with Anglicans making up 29.74% of the population. The third largest religious denomination in Pares West were Adventists, making up 19.49% of the population. The remainder of the population was other Christian denominations, with an additional 1.03% of the population being Rastafarian, and 0.51% of the population being irreligious.

=== Pares (East) ===
In combination of Pares East #1 and Pares East #2, Pares East has a total population of 375 people. 90.16% of the population of Pares East is African descendant, 4.92% are other mixed, 2.46% are Indian, 1.09% are Hispanic, 0.82% of the population didn't know or didn't state their ethnicity, and 0.55% of the population were Syrian/Lebanese. 77.60% of the population of Pares East was born in Antigua and Barbuda, 7.92% were born in Guyana, 2.46% in the United States, and the rest in various other Caribbean countries. The largest religious denomination in Pares East are Adventists, making up 23.55% of the population. The next largest religious group in Pares East are Anglicans, making up 21.05% of the population. Trailing closely behind, the third largest religious group in Pares East are Pentecostals, making up 20.22% of the population. The rest of the population are various other Christian denominations, with 3.32% of the population being irreligious and 1.66% of the population being Rastafarian.

==== Pares (East) #1 ====
Pares East #1 has an area of 0.089 square kilometres. Pares East #1 is the most central area of Pares, and is also the smallest enumeration district/neighbourhood of Pares. Pares East #1 has a population of 195 people. 91.05% of the population of Pares East #1 is African descendant, 4.21% are other mixed, 2.11% are Indian, 1.58% are Hispanic, and 1.05% of the population didn't know or didn't state their ethnicity. 76.32% of the population of Pares East #1 was born in Antigua and Barbuda, 10.00% of the population were born in Guyana, 4.74% in the Dominican Republic, and the rest of the population were born in various other countries in the Americas. 28.57% of the population of Pares East #1 are Anglican, 26.46% of the population are Adventist, 20.11% of the population are Pentecostal, and the rest of the population are various other Christian denominations, with 3.17% of the population being Rastafarian and no people reporting themselves as irreligious. 7.94% of the population didn't know or didn't state their religious affiliation.

==== Pares (East) #2 ====
Pares East #2 has an area of 0.26 square kilometres. Pares East #2 is the easternmost area of Pares, and is also the largest enumeration district/neighbourhood in Pares. Pares East #2 has a population of 180 people. 89.20% of the population of Pares East #2 is African descendant, 5.68% of the population is other Mixed, 2.84% of the population is Indian, 1.14% of the population is Syrian/Lebanese, 0.57% of the population is Hispanic, and 0.57% of the population didn't know or didn't state their ethnicity. 78.98% of the population of Pares East #2 was born in Antigua and Barbuda, 5.68% of the population was born in Guyana, 2.84% of the population was born in the United States (excluding the U.S. Virgin Islands), and the rest of the population of Pares East #2 was born in various other Caribbean countries and territories. 20.35% of the population of Pares East #2 is Adventist, 20.35% of the population is Pentecostal, 12.79% of the population is Anglican, 12.79% of the population is Evangelical, 6.98% of the population is irreligious, and 7.56% of the population didn't know or didn't state their religion.

== Demographics ==
Population census
Year	Pop.	±% p.a.
1856	139	—
1991	459	+0.89%
2001	620	+3.05%
2011	575	−0.75%
Source: 1856 Census, 2001 Census, 1991 Census

=== Ethnicity ===
Out of the 575 people living in Pares, 84.14% of the population is African descendant. The remainder of the population of Pares is 7.31% other mixed, 3.03% mixed Black/White, 3.03% Indian, 1.07% Hispanic, 1.07% of the population didn't know or didn't state their ethnicity, and 0.36% of the population is Syrian/Lebanese.

=== Immigration ===
76.11% of the population of Pares was born in Antigua and Barbuda, 0.71% of the population were born in "Other Latin or North American countries", 1.25% of the population were born in "Other Caribbean countries", 1.25% of the population were born in Dominica, 1.96% of the population were born in the Dominican Republic, 9.63% in Guyana, 3.03% in Jamaica, 0.18% in Montserrat, 0.18% in Saint Vincent and the Grenadines, 0.18% in the United Kingdom, 3.03% in the United States, 0.89% in the United States Virgin Islands, and 1.60% did not state their country of birth.

=== Emigration ===
95.02% of households in Pares have had 0 people migrate abroad, 3.98% of households had 1 person migrate abroad, and 1.00% of households had 2 or more persons migrate abroad. Out of the 51 persons living in Pares who had migrated abroad from Antigua and Barbuda and later returned to Antigua and Barbuda, 56.00% of these persons had migrated back due to regarding Antigua and Barbuda as "home", 22.00% due to family, 10.00% for no reason, 6.00% for other reasons such as involuntary reasons, to start a business, or for education, 4.00% for employment or work, and 2.00% for retirement. 11.71% of the population of Pares have lived overseas at some point. 280 people living in Pares have never moved.

=== Young people ===
28.16% of the population, or 162 people, are young people, who are defined as people aged 0-17 years old. 6.42% of the population are aged 0-4 years old, 6.24% 5-9 years old, 9.98% 10-14 years old, and 8.56% are aged 15-19 years old.

=== Elderly ===
11.41% of the population, or 66 people, are older people, who are defined as people aged 60 or older. 3.74% of the population are aged 60-64, 2.67% are aged 65-69, 1.25% of the population are aged 70-74, 1.07% of the population are aged 75-79, and 2.67% of the population are aged 80 and over.

=== Unmet basic needs ===
10.70% of the population had an unmet basic need for housing, 0.89% of the population had an unmet basic need for water, 0.53% for sanitation, 0.36% for fuel, 0.18% for refuse collection, 1.60% for information, 13.90% of the population had one or more unmet basic needs, and 0.36% had two or more unmet basic needs.

== Religion ==
Pares is home to the Pares Pentecostal Church and the Pares SDA Church, both located in Pares East.

=== Religion statistics ===
22.12% of the population is Adventist, 24.10% of the population is Anglican, 0.54% of the population is Baptist, 1.26% of the population is Church of God, 3.96% of the population is Evangelical, 1.62% of the population is Jehovah's Witness, 4.50% of the population is Methodist, 2.34% of the population is irreligious, 25.00% of the population is Pentecostal, 1.44% of the population is Rastafarian, 5.94% of the population didn't know or didn't state their religion, and the remainder of the population is composed mostly of other Christian denominations.

== Economy ==
=== Employment and income ===
26.10% of workers in Pares are paid employees for the government, 5.15% are paid employees for statutory bodies, 50.74% are paid private employees, 4.78% are paid private home employees, 0.74% are self-employed with paid employees, 9.19% are self-employed without paid employees, 1.10% are other types of workers, and 2.21% didn't know or didn't state their worker status. Out of the 23 people asked about their accounts, 27.27% have a complete set of written accounts, 13.64% answered only through informal records, 22.73% had simplified written accounts, and 36.36% kept no records. Out of the 445 people asked, 62.67% are employed, 7.14% are unemployed, 29.26% are inactive, and 0.92% did not state their employment status.

3.69% of people participate in subsistence farming.

444 people receive money from overseas, 97.46% of those people receive less than EC$100, 1.15% receive 100 to 499 EC$, 0.23% receive 500 to 999 EC$, 0.46% receive 1,000 to 1,999 EC$, 0.23% receive 2,000 to 4,999 EC$, and 0.46% receive 5,000 to 99,999 EC$.

=== Business ownership ===
Out of the 17 business owners in Pares, 23.53% of businesses make under 1,000 $EC per month, 11.76% make 1,000 to 1,999 $EC per month, 29.41% make 2,000 to 2,999 $EC per month, and 35.29% make 3,000 to 4,999 $EC per month.

=== Housing and land tenure ===
There are 219 households in Pares. 12.33% of homes are owned with mortgage, 49.32% of homes are owned outright, 2.28% of homes are rent free, 20.09% of homes are rented private, 3.20% of homes have another type of ownership, and 12.79% didn't know or didn't state. 91.78% of dwellings are a separate house, 0.46% are part of a private house, 5.02% are flats, apartments, or condos, 1.83% are double houses or duplexes, and 0.91% didn't know or didn't state. 57.53% of households have their land owned or freeheld.

34.70% of households had concrete as the main material of their outer walls, 1.37% used concrete/blocks, 40.18% used wood, 12.33% used wood and brick, 9.59% used wood and concrete, 0.91% used wood and galvanized, and 0.91% used other materials. 0.91% of households had concrete roofs, 94.06% of households had sheet metal roofs, 4.11% of households had asphalt shingles, and 0.91% used wood shingles.

91.32% of households had their main kitchen inside, 4.11% outside, and 4.57% didn't know or didn't state. 95.89% of households used cooking gas/LPG as the main source of fuel, 1.37% used electricity, 1.37% used wood/charcoal or kerosene, and 1.37% used none.

As of 2011, 29.68% of households owned a desktop computer, and 33.33% of households owned a laptop. In 2011, 46.58% of households did not have access to the internet, 35.16% did have access to the internet, and 18.26% didn't know or didn't declare.

96.35% of households did not own an air conditioner, and 3.65%, only eight households, did own an air conditioner. Out of these eight households, 87.50% owned one air conditioner, and 12.50%, one household, owned two air conditioners.

== Water ==
56.62% of people stated their main source of water as public water piped into dwelling. For drinking water, 57.53% of people used cistern/tank as their main source of drinking water, 27.85% used bottled water, 9.59% didn't know or didn't state, 4.11% used other sources, and 0.91% used public water piped into dwelling.

== Education ==
=== Education statistics ===
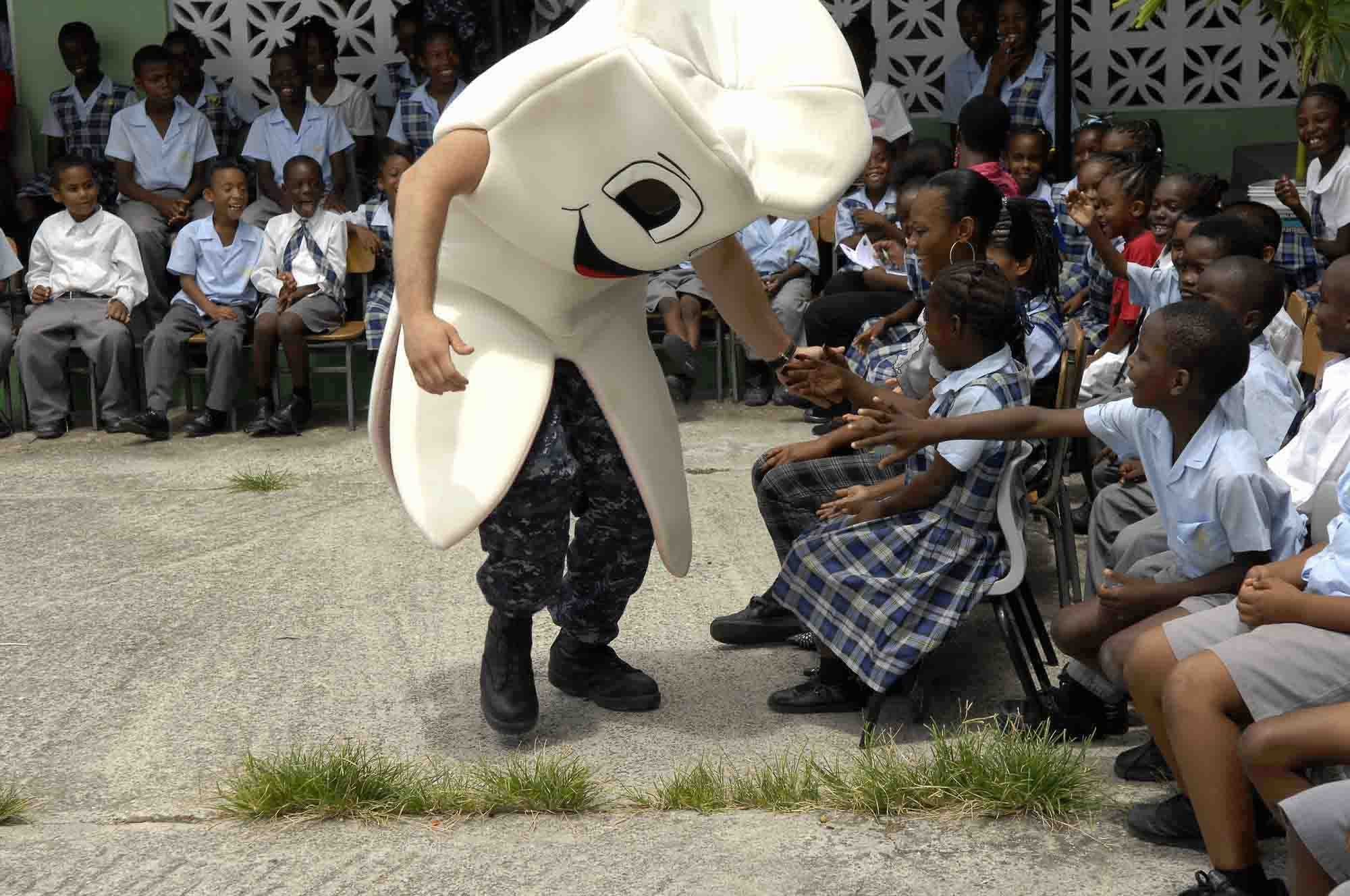
Students at Pares Primary School

42.60% of residents had no educational examination, 5.17% had a school leaving certificate, 2.14% had a high school certificate, 4.28% had a Cambridge School/CXC, 17.65% had a GCE 'O' level/CXC General, 2.85% had a GCE 'A' Levels, CAPE, 6.42% had a college certificate, 2.67% had an associate degree, 2.85% had a bachelor's degree, 0.53% had a post graduate diploma, 0.53% had a professional certificate, 0.71% had a master's or doctoral degree, 2.50% had an other degree, and 9.09% didn't know or didn't state their examination.

=== Educational facilities ===
==== Pares Primary School ====
Pares Primary School is located in Zone 2, and in the 2017-2018 school year, had 122 pupils.

==== Pares Secondary School ====
Pares Secondary School has an enrollment of 353 pupils from various villages in Saint Peter's parish during the 2017-2018 school year. The school has a cricket team, and an alumni association with a chapter in the Cayman Islands.

== Government ==
Pares has no local government such as a village/town/city council and is part of and mostly consists of the "B" division of the Saint Peter parliamentary constituency as of 2023.

There are five laws mentioning Pares Village.

=== Electoral history ===
Pares Village is a part of the "B" polling district of the Saint Peter constituency, with the overwhelming majority of "B" polling district residents living in Pares and a few others living in surrounding localities and hamlets.

==== 2018 general election in Pares ====
In 2018, Asot Michael who was the Labour Party candidate won the "B" polling district.

==== 2023 general election in Pares ====
Party	Total	Percentage
Asot Michael (IND)	342	60.85%
ABLP	137	24.38%
UPP	79	14.06%
DNA	2	0.36%
Rejected	2	0.36%
Total votes	562	
Registered voters	674	

Out of the 674 registered voters, 562 votes were cast, leading to a 83.38% turnout.

=== Police ===
Pares is patrolled by the Willikies Police Station Service District, led by Assistant Superintendent Canute Mitchel and part of the B Division of the Royal Police Force of Antigua and Barbuda.
