= Index of Antigua and Barbuda–related articles =

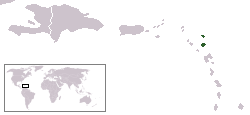
The location of the nation of Antigua and Barbuda.

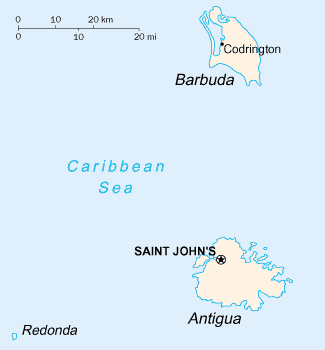
A map of Antigua and Barbuda.

The following is an alphabetical list of topics related to the nation of Antigua and Barbuda.

== 0–9 ==
- .ag – Internet country code top-level domain for Antigua and Barbuda

== A ==
- Airports in Antigua and Barbuda
- Ameiva griswoldi
- Americas
  - North America
    - North Atlantic Ocean
      - West Indies
        - Caribbean Sea
          - Antilles
            - Lesser Antilles
              - Islands of Antigua and Barbuda
- Anglo-America
- Antigua island
- Antigua and Barbuda
- Antigua and Barbuda at the Olympics
- Antigua Carnival
- Antiguan, adjective and noun for island and nation
- Antiguan British
- Antiguan English
- Antiguans and Barbudans
- Antilles
- Army of Antigua and Barbuda
- Atlas of Antigua and Barbuda

== B ==
- Barbuda island
- Barbudan, adjective and noun for island and nation
- Barbuda Land Acts
- Benna (genre)
- Bibliography of Antigua and Barbuda
- Lester Bird
- Vere Cornwall Bird
- Baldwin Spencer
- Birds of Antigua and Barbuda
- Burning Flames

== C ==
- Capital of Antigua and Barbuda: Saint John's on Antigua
- Caribbean
- Caribbean Community (CARICOM)
- Caribbean Sea
- James Carlisle
- Categories:
  - Category:Antigua and Barbuda
    - Category:Antigua and Barbuda people
    - Category:Antigua and Barbuda stubs
    - Category:Antigua and Barbuda-related lists
    - Category:Buildings and structures in Antigua and Barbuda
    - Category:Communications in Antigua and Barbuda
    - Category:Culture of Antigua and Barbuda
    - Category:Economy of Antigua and Barbuda
    - Category:Education in Antigua and Barbuda
    - Category:Environment of Antigua and Barbuda
    - Category:Geography of Antigua and Barbuda
    - Category:Government of Antigua and Barbuda
    - Category:Health in Antigua and Barbuda
    - Category:History of Antigua and Barbuda
    - Category:Law of Antigua and Barbuda
    - Category:Military of Antigua and Barbuda
    - Category:Politics of Antigua and Barbuda
    - Category:Society of Antigua and Barbuda
    - Category:Sport in Antigua and Barbuda
    - Category:Transport in Antigua and Barbuda
  - commons:Category:Antigua and Barbuda
- Coat of arms of Antigua and Barbuda
- Commonwealth of Nations
- Commonwealth realm of Antigua and Barbuda
- Communications in Antigua and Barbuda
- COVID-19 pandemic in Antigua and Barbuda
- Cuisine of Antigua and Barbuda
- Curtly Ambrose

== D ==
- Demographics of Antigua and Barbuda
- Deputy President of the Senate of Antigua and Barbuda
- Diplomatic missions in Antigua and Barbuda
- Diplomatic missions of Antigua and Barbuda

== E ==
- Economy of Antigua and Barbuda
- Education in Antigua and Barbuda
- El-A-Kru
- Elections in Antigua and Barbuda
  - Antigua and Barbuda general election, 2004
- English colonization of the Americas
- English language

== F ==
The Flag of Antigua and Barbuda

- "Fair Antigua, We Salute Thee"
- Flag of Antigua and Barbuda
- Football in Antigua and Barbuda
  - Football clubs in Antigua and Barbuda
- Foreign relations of Antigua and Barbuda

== G ==
- Geography of Antigua and Barbuda
- Government of Antigua and Barbuda
- Great Bird Island, Antigua

== H ==
- History of Antigua and Barbuda

== I ==
- International Organization for Standardization (ISO)
  - ISO 3166-1 alpha-2 country code for Antigua and Barbuda: AG
  - ISO 3166-1 alpha-3 country code for Antigua and Barbuda: ATG
  - ISO 3166-2:AG region codes for Antigua and Barbuda
- Islam in Antigua and Barbuda
- Internet in Antigua and Barbuda
- Islands of Antigua and Barbuda:
  - Antigua
  - Barbuda
  - Bird Island, Antigua and Barbuda
  - Bishop Island
  - Blake Island, Antigua and Barbuda
  - Cinnamon Island
  - Codrington Island
  - Crump Island
  - Dulcina Island
  - Exchange Island
  - Five Islands, Antigua and Barbuda
  - Great Bird Island, Antigua
  - Green Island, Antigua and Barbuda
  - Guana Island, Antigua and Barbuda
  - Hale Gate Island
  - Hawes Island
  - Henry Island
  - Johnson Island, Antigua and Barbuda
  - Kid Island
  - Laviscounts Island
  - Lobster Island
  - Long Island, Antigua
  - Maid Island
  - Moor Island
  - Nanny Island
  - Pelican Island, Antigua and Barbuda
  - Prickly Pear Island
  - Rabbit Island, Antigua
  - Rat Island, Antigua and Barbuda
  - Red Head Island
  - Redonda
  - Sandy Island, Antigua and Barbuda
  - Smith Island, Antigua and Barbuda
  - The Sisters, Antigua and Barbuda
  - Vernon Island
  - Wicked Will Island
  - York Island (Antigua and Barbuda)

== L ==
- Languages of Antigua and Barbuda
- Law enforcement in Antigua and Barbuda
- Leeward Islands
- Lesser Antilles
- LGBT rights in Antigua and Barbuda (Gay rights)
- Lists related to Antigua and Barbuda:
  - Diplomatic missions of Antigua and Barbuda
  - List of airports in Antigua and Barbuda
  - List of Antigua and Barbuda-related topics
  - List of Antiguans and Barbudans
  - List of birds of Antigua and Barbuda
  - List of diplomatic missions in Antigua and Barbuda
  - List of football clubs in Antigua and Barbuda
  - List of islands of Antigua and Barbuda
  - List of mammals of Antigua and Barbuda
  - List of newspapers in Antigua and Barbuda
  - List of parliamentary constituencies of Antigua and Barbuda
  - List of political parties in Antigua and Barbuda
  - List of rivers of Antigua and Barbuda
  - List of schools in Antigua and Barbuda

== M ==
- Mammals of Antigua and Barbuda
- Military history of Antigua and Barbuda
- Military of Antigua and Barbuda
- Monarchy of Antigua and Barbuda
- Music of Antigua and Barbuda

== N ==
- National anthem of Antigua and Barbuda
- Navy of Antigua and Barbuda
- North America
- Northern Hemisphere

== O ==
- Office of the Ombudsman (Antigua and Barbuda)
- Organisation of Eastern Caribbean States (OECS)

== P ==
- Politics of Antigua and Barbuda
  - List of political parties in Antigua and Barbuda
- President of the Senate of Antigua and Barbuda
- Prime Minister of Antigua and Barbuda
- Prominent Antiguans and Barbudans

== R ==
- Racer Snake
- Religion in Antigua and Barbuda
- Revenue stamps of Antigua
- Richie Richardson
- Rivers of Antigua and Barbuda
- Andy Roberts
- Romantic Rhythms Music Festival
- Rugby union in Antigua and Barbuda

== S ==
- Saint John's on Antigua – Capital of Antigua and Barbuda
- Senate of Antigua and Barbuda
- St. John's Cathedral, St. John's
- Sir Vivian Richards Cricket Grounds
- Stanford 20/20
- Shermain Jeremy

== T ==
- Topic outline of Antigua and Barbuda
- Transport in Antigua and Barbuda

== U ==
- United Nations, member state since 1981
- United States-Antigua and Barbuda relations

== V ==
- VC Bird International Airport
- Viv Richards
- Visa policy of Antigua and Barbuda

== W ==
- West Indies
- Western Hemisphere
- Wikimedia Atlas of Antigua and Barbuda
- Wikipedia:WikiProject Topic outline/Drafts/Topic outline of Antigua and Barbuda

== See also ==
- List of Caribbean-related topics
- List of international rankings
- Lists of country-related topics
- Outline of Antigua and Barbuda
