= List of islands of Antigua and Barbuda =

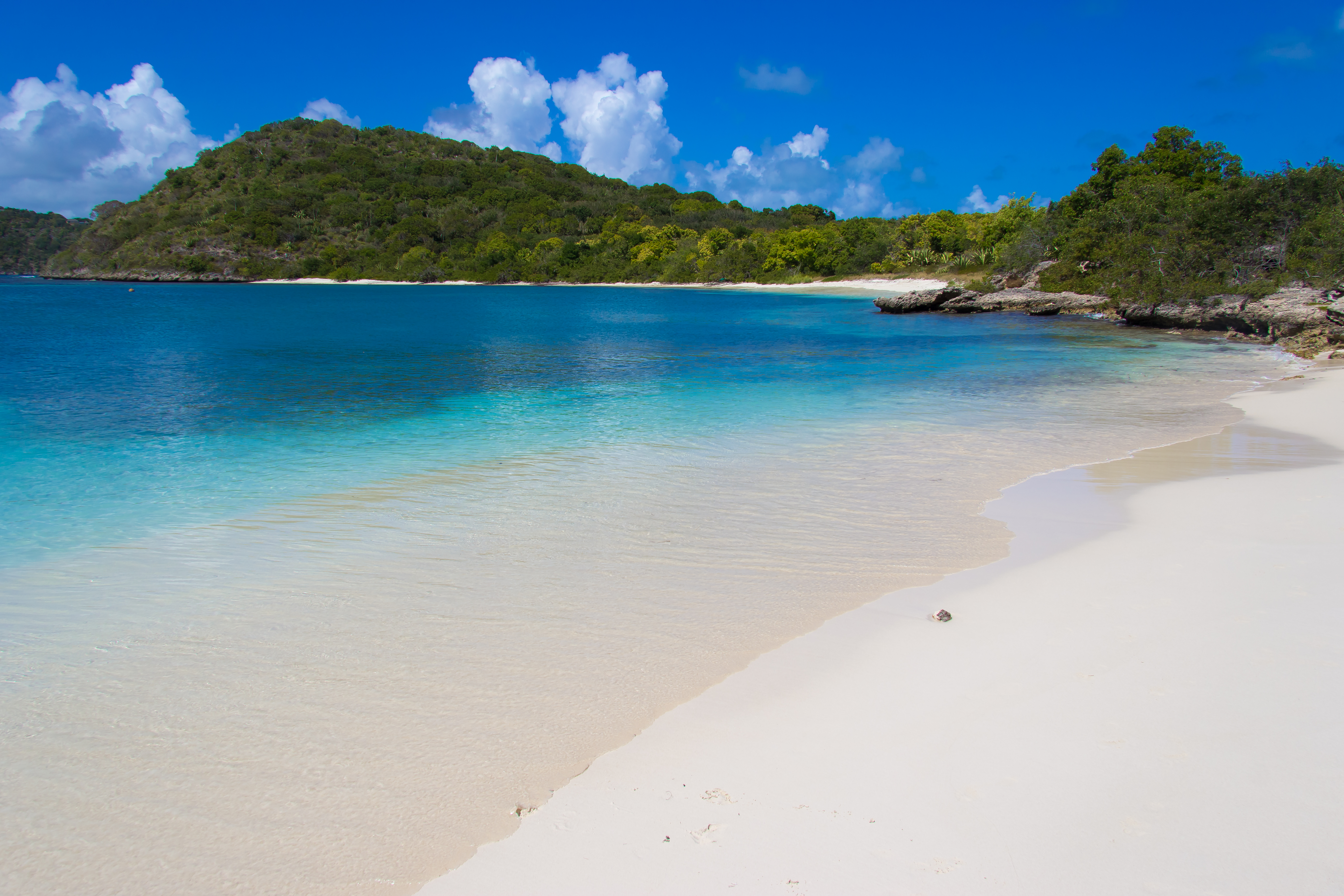
Green Island, off the coast of Antigua

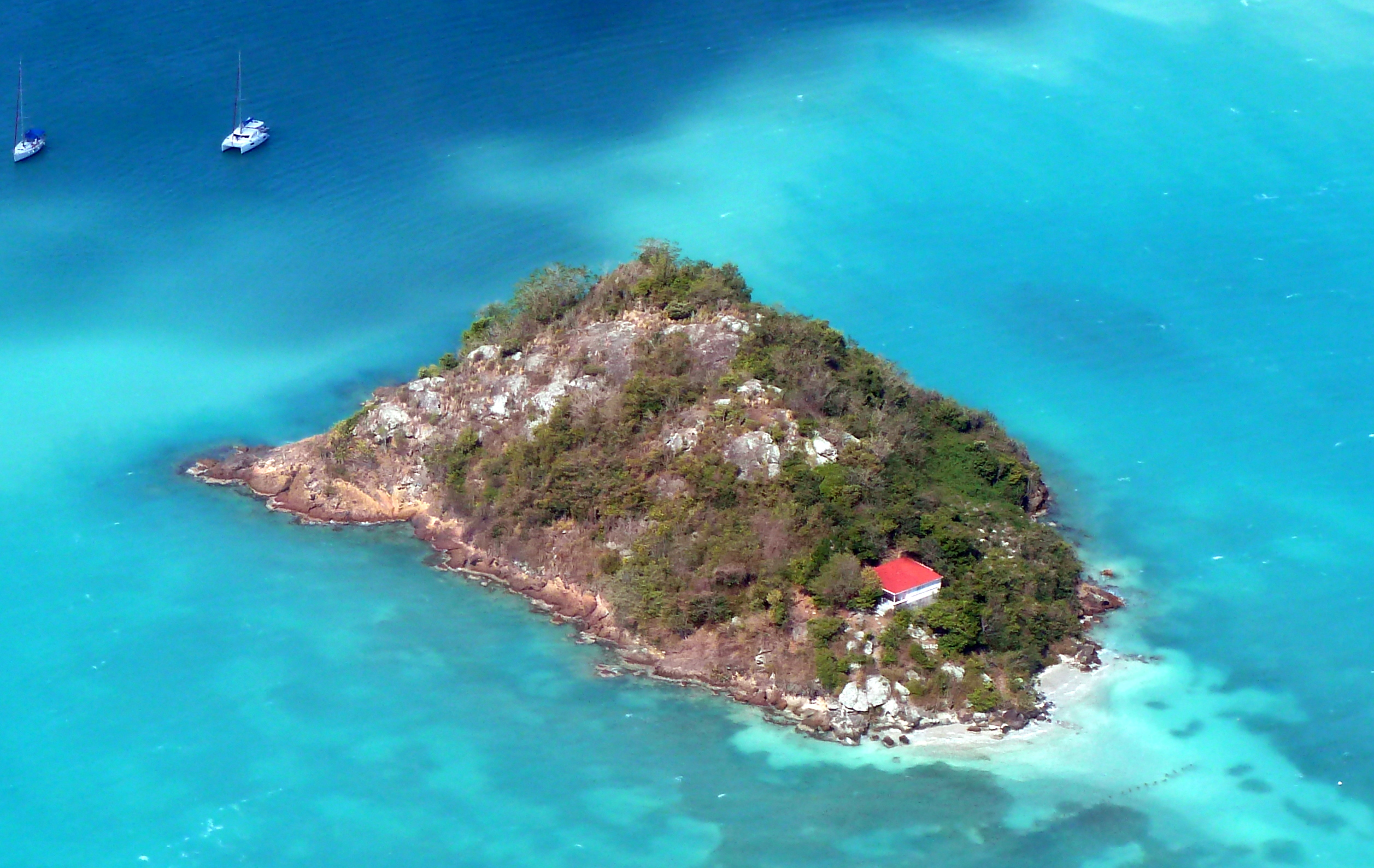
Maiden Island in Hanson's Bay

Antigua and Barbuda is an archipelagic state in the Leeward Islands of the West Indies. There are 54 islands in the country, including three main ones.

== Antigua ==
- Antigua, 17°5′0″N 61°48′0″W, 280 km^{2} (110 sq mi)
  - Blake Island^{17°0′52″N 61°46′58″W}
  - Cinnamon Island^{17°7′21″N 61°47′9″W}
  - Five Islands^{17°04′50″N 61°54′50″W}
  - Hawksbill Rock^{17°6′43″N 61°54′8″W}
  - Johnson Island^{17°01′31″N 61°53′28″W}
  - Maiden Island^{17°5′44″N 61°53′14″W}
  - Moor Rock^{17°09′49″N 61°45′27.0″W}
  - Mouse Island^{17°07′42.0″N 61°46′13″W}
  - Neck of Land^{17°03′40″N 61°40′29″W}
  - Sandy Island^{17°8′4″N 61°55′36″W}
  - Smith Island^{17°2′27″N 61°40′48″W}
  - The Sisters^{17°9′39″N 61°52′6″W}
  - Vernon's Island^{17°6′51″N 61°46′8″W}
  - Wicked Will Island^{17°02′53.5″N 61°40′19.5″W}

=== Northeast Marine Management Area ===
- Prickly Pear Island^{17°10′33″N 61°47′53″W}
- Great Bird Island^{17°8′46″N 61°43′31″W}
- Galley Island Major^{17°08′35.5″N 61°43′37.5″W}
- Galley Island Minor
- Jenny Island
- Exchange Island^{17°08′11″N 61°43′23″W}
- Rabbit Island^{17°8′10″N 61°43′52″W}
- Lobster Island^{17°8′1″N 61°43′47″W}
- Long Island^{17°9′19″N 61°45′14″W}
- Maiden Island^{17°8′44″N 61°45′48″W}
- Rat Island^{17°7′44″N 61°46′11″W}
- Little Bird Island^{17°09′27″N 61°44′17″W}
- Hell's Gate Island^{17°8′26″N 61°43′18″W}
- Monocle Point Island
- Red Head Island^{17°8′16″N 61°43′41″W}
- Guiana Island^{17°7′26″N 61°43′57″W}
- Crump Island^{17°6′32″N 61°43′8″W}
- Nanny Island (Henry Island)^{17°04′05″N 61°41′26″W}
- Laviscounts Island^{17°5′57″N 61°43′24″W}
- Bird Island^{17°4′45″N 61°40′20″W}
- Round Island
- Hawes Island^{17°6′46″N 61°43′40″W}
- Little Island
- Green Island^{17°4′11″N 61°39′58″W}
- Pelican Island^{17°06′21″N 61°42′17″W}
- York Island^{17°3′11″N 61°40′9″W}
- Codrington Island^{17°6′9″N 61°42′21″W}

== Barbuda ==
- Barbuda, 17°37′0″N 61°48′0″W, 161 km^{2} (62 sq mi)
  - Goat Island^{17°42′20″N 61°50′49″W}
  - Kid Island^{17°41′47″N 61°48′52″W}
  - Man of War Island^{17°40′5″N 61°51′5″W}
  - Rabbit Island^{17°42′23″N 61°49′36″W}

== Redonda ==
- Redonda (uninhabited), 16°56′20″N 62°20′30″W, 1.3 km^{2} (0.50 sq mi)

== See also ==
- List of islands in the Caribbean
- Geography of Antigua and Barbuda
