= Geography of Antigua and Barbuda =

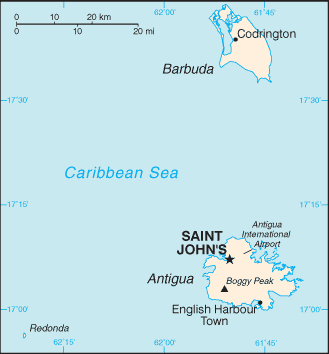
- Region: Caribbean
- Coordinates: 17°03′N 61°48′W
- Area: Ranked 181st
  - Total: 442.6 km^{2} (170.9 sq mi)
  - Land: 95.33%
  - Water: 4.67%
- Coastline: 153 km (95 mi)
- Borders: No land borders
- Highest point: Boggy Peak; 402 meters (1,319 ft)
- Lowest point: Atlantic Ocean; 0 metres (0 ft)
- Longest river: None
- Largest lake: Potsworks Reservoir; 2.430 ha (6.00 acres)
- Terrain: low-lying limestone and coral islands, with some higher volcanic areas
- Natural resources: marine resources, cotton
- Natural hazards: hurricanes and tropical storms (July to October); periodic droughts
- Environmental issues: water management, deforestation
- Exclusive economic zone: 110,089 km^{2} (42,506 mi^{2})

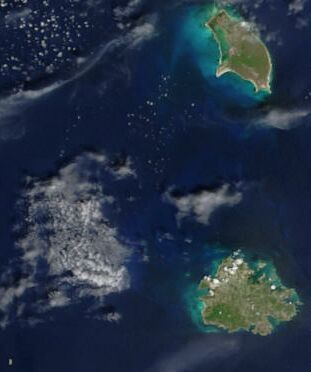
Satellite image of Antigua and Barbuda.

Antigua and Barbuda lie in the eastern arc of the Leeward Islands of the Lesser Antilles, separating the Atlantic Ocean from the Caribbean Sea. Antigua is 650 km (400 mi) southeast of Puerto Rico; Barbuda lies 48 km (30 mi) due north of Antigua, and the uninhabited island of Redonda is 56 km (35 mi) southwest of Antigua.

The largest island of Antigua, is 21 km (about a dozen miles) across and 281 km^{2} (about a hundred square miles) in area. Barbuda covers 161 km^{2} (62 sq mi) while Redonda encompasses 2.6 km^{2} (1.0 sq mi). The capital of Antigua and Barbuda is St. John's, located at St. John's Harbour on the northwest coast of Antigua. The principal city of Barbuda is Codrington, located on Codrington Lagoon.

In Antigua and Barbuda forest cover is around 18% of the total land area, equivalent to 8,120 hectares (ha) of forest in 2020, down from 10,110 hectares (ha) in 1990.

== Geology ==
Antigua and Barbuda both are generally low-lying islands whose terrain has been influenced more by limestone formations than volcanic activity. The highest point on Antigua is Boggy Peak, the remnant of a volcanic crater rising 402 meters (1,319 ft). This mountain is located amid a bulge of hills of volcanic origin in the southwestern part of the island. Lake Estate is the third tallest recorded point on Antigua.

The limestone formations in the northeast and northwest are separated from the southwestern volcanic area by a central plain of clay formations. The map of northeastern Antigua features several small and tiny islands, some inhabited. Barbuda's highest elevation is 44.5 metres (146 ft), part of the highland plateau east of Codrington. The shorelines of both islands are greatly indented with beaches, lagoons, and natural harbors. The islands are rimmed by reefs and shoals. There are few streams as rainfall is slight. Both islands lack adequate amounts of fresh groundwater. Tiny Redonda rises to 246 metres (807 ft) and has very little level ground, while Barbuda is very flat with few if any hills.

== Oceanography ==
Due to the spread out islands it has an Exclusive Economic Zone of 110,089 km^{2} (42,506 mi^{2}).

== Islands ==
- Antigua 17°5′0″N 61°48′0″W
  - Prickly Pear Island 17°10′33″N 61°47′53″W
  - Great Bird Island 17°8′46″N 61°43′31″W
  - Galley Island Major 17°08′35.5″N 61°43′37.5″W
  - Galley Island Minor
  - Exchange Island 17°08′11″N 61°43′23″W
  - Rabbit Island 17°8′10″N 61°43′52″W
  - Lobster Island 17°8′1″N 61°43′47″W
  - Long Island 17°9′19″N 61°45′14″W
  - Maiden Island 17°8′44″N 61°45′48″W
  - Rat Island 17°7′44″N 61°46′11″W
  - Little Bird Island 17°09′27″N 61°44′17″W
  - Hells Gate Island 17°8′26″N 61°43′18″W
  - Monocle Point Island
  - Red Head Island 17°8′16″N 61°43′41″W
  - Guiana Island 17°7′26″N 61°43′57″W
  - Crump Island 17°6′32″N 61°43′8″W
  - Nanny Island (Henry Island) 17°04′05″N 61°41′26″W
  - Laviscounts Island 17°5′57″N 61°43′24″W
  - Bird Island 17°4′45″N 61°40′20″W
  - Round Island
  - Hawes Island 17°6′46″N 61°43′40″W
  - Little Island
  - Green Island 17°4′11″N 61°39′58″W
  - Pelican Island 17°06′21″N 61°42′17″W
  - York Island 17°3′11″N 61°40′9″W
  - Codrington Island 17°6′9″N 61°42′21″W
  - Blake Island 17°0′52″N 61°46′58″W
  - Cinnamon Island 17°7′21″N 61°47′9″W
  - Hawksbill Rock 17°6′43″N 61°54′8″W
  - Johnson Island 17°01′31″N 61°53′28″W
  - Maiden Island 17°5′44″N 61°53′14″W
  - Moor Rock 17°09′49″N 61°45′27.0″W
  - Mouse Island 17°07′42.0″N 61°46′13″W
  - Neck of Land 17°03′40″N 61°40′29″W
  - Sandy Island 17°8′4″N 61°55′36″W
  - Smith Island 17°2′27″N 61°40′48″W
  - The Sisters 17°9′39″N 61°52′6″W
  - Vernon's Island 17°6′51″N 61°46′8″W
  - Wicked Will Island 17°02′53.5″N 61°40′19.5″W
- Barbuda 17°37′0″N 61°48′0″W
  - Goat Island 17°42′20″N 61°50′49″W
  - Kid Island 17°41′47″N 61°48′52″W
  - Man of War Island 17°40′5″N 61°51′5″W
  - Rabbit Island 17°42′23″N 61°49′36″W
- Redonda 16°56′20″N 62°20′30″W

== Climate ==
Climate types: Tropical monsoon (Am) Tropical savanna (Aw) Hot semi-arid climate (BSh)

The islands' climate is moderated by fairly constant northeast tradewinds, with velocities ranging between 30 and 48 km/h (19 and 30 mph). There is little precipitation because of the islands' low elevations. The pleasant climate fosters tourism.

Rainfall averages 990 mm (39 in) per year, with the amount varying widely from season to season. In general the wettest period is between September and November. The islands generally experience low humidity and recurrent droughts.

Hurricanes strike on an average of once a year between July and October. Temperatures average 27 °C (80.6 °F), with a range from 23 °C (73.4 °F) in the winter to 30 °C (86 °F) in the summer and autumn. On 12 August 1995, a temperature of 34.9 °C (94.8 °F) was recorded at St. John's. This is the highest temperature to have ever been recorded in Antigua and Barbuda. The coolest period is between December and February.

Climate data for St. John's, Antigua and Barbuda (V. C. Bird International Airport)
| Month | Jan | Feb | Mar | Apr | May | Jun | Jul | Aug | Sep | Oct | Nov | Dec | Year |
|---|---|---|---|---|---|---|---|---|---|---|---|---|---|
| Record high °C (°F) | 31.2 (88.2) | 31.8 (89.2) | 32.9 (91.2) | 32.7 (90.9) | 34.1 (93.4) | 32.9 (91.2) | 33.5 (92.3) | 34.9 (94.8) | 34.3 (93.7) | 34.1 (93.4) | 32.6 (90.7) | 31.5 (88.7) | 34.9 (94.8) |
| Mean daily maximum °C (°F) | 28.3 (82.9) | 28.4 (83.1) | 28.8 (83.8) | 29.4 (84.9) | 30.2 (86.4) | 30.6 (87.1) | 30.9 (87.6) | 31.2 (88.2) | 31.1 (88.0) | 30.6 (87.1) | 29.8 (85.6) | 28.8 (83.8) | 29.8 (85.6) |
| Daily mean °C (°F) | 25.4 (77.7) | 25.2 (77.4) | 25.6 (78.1) | 26.3 (79.3) | 27.2 (81.0) | 27.9 (82.2) | 28.2 (82.8) | 28.3 (82.9) | 28.1 (82.6) | 27.5 (81.5) | 26.8 (80.2) | 25.9 (78.6) | 26.9 (80.4) |
| Mean daily minimum °C (°F) | 22.4 (72.3) | 22.2 (72.0) | 22.7 (72.9) | 23.4 (74.1) | 24.5 (76.1) | 25.3 (77.5) | 25.3 (77.5) | 25.5 (77.9) | 25.0 (77.0) | 24.4 (75.9) | 23.9 (75.0) | 23.0 (73.4) | 24.0 (75.2) |
| Record low °C (°F) | 15.5 (59.9) | 16.6 (61.9) | 17.0 (62.6) | 16.6 (61.9) | 17.8 (64.0) | 19.7 (67.5) | 20.6 (69.1) | 19.3 (66.7) | 20.0 (68.0) | 20.0 (68.0) | 17.7 (63.9) | 16.1 (61.0) | 15.5 (59.9) |
| Average precipitation mm (inches) | 56.6 (2.23) | 44.9 (1.77) | 46.0 (1.81) | 72.0 (2.83) | 89.6 (3.53) | 62.0 (2.44) | 86.5 (3.41) | 99.4 (3.91) | 131.6 (5.18) | 142.2 (5.60) | 135.1 (5.32) | 83.4 (3.28) | 1,049.2 (41.31) |
| Average precipitation days (≥ 1.0 mm) | 11.1 | 8.7 | 7.3 | 7.2 | 8.6 | 8.3 | 11.8 | 12.7 | 12.0 | 12.9 | 12.4 | 12.1 | 124.7 |
Source: Antigua/Barbuda Meteorological Services

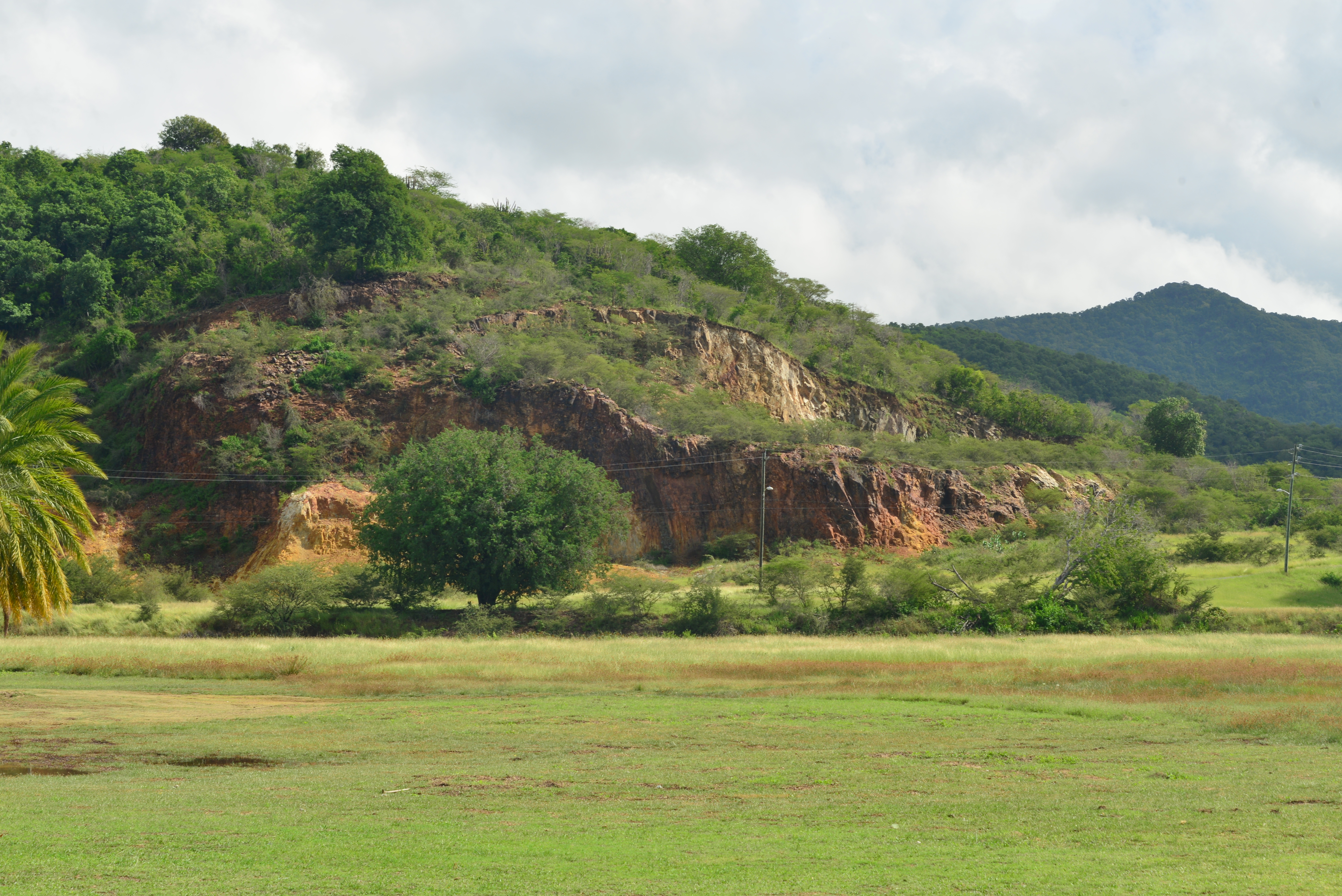
Outcroppings on Valley Road

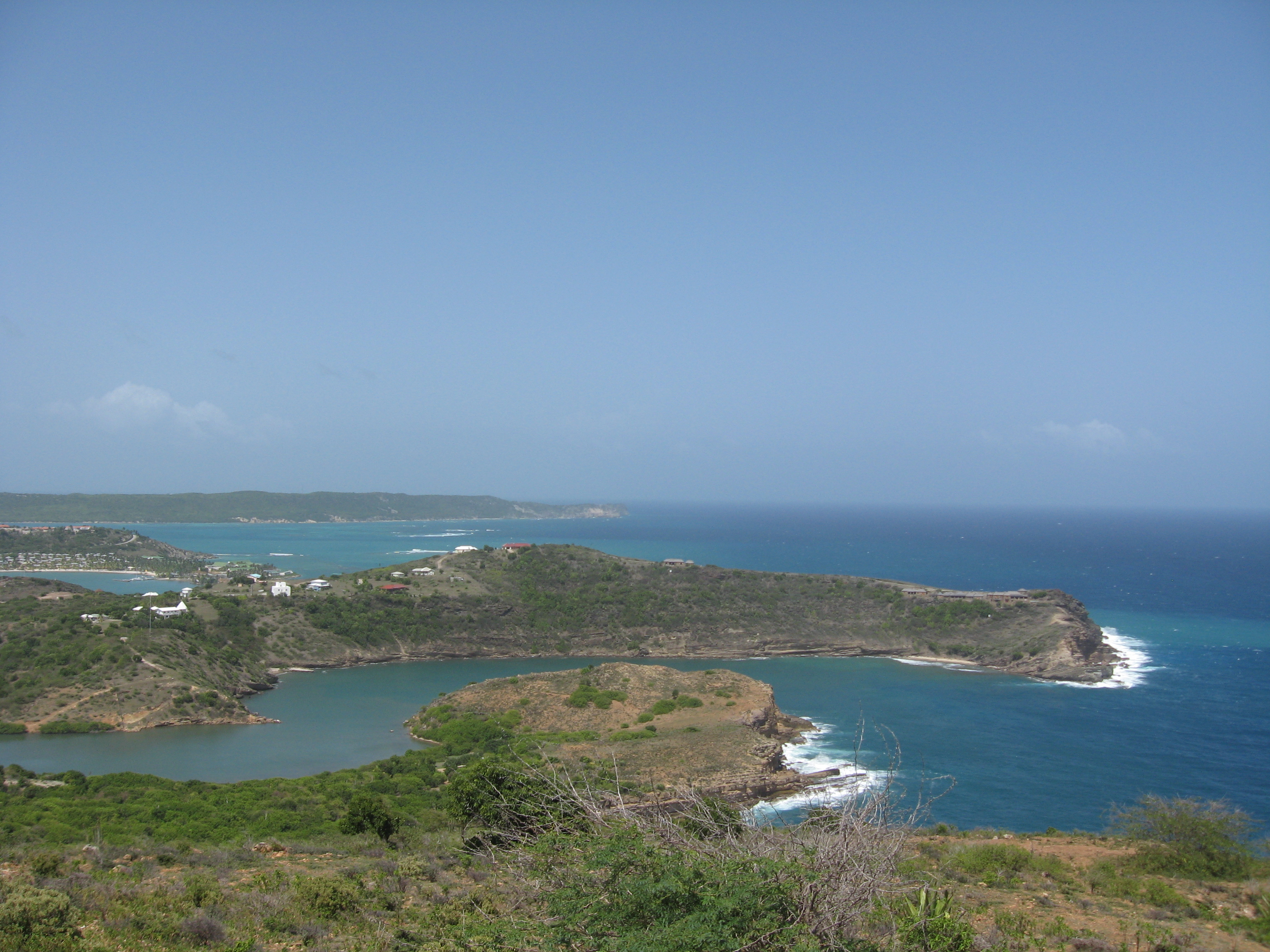
Antigua southern shore

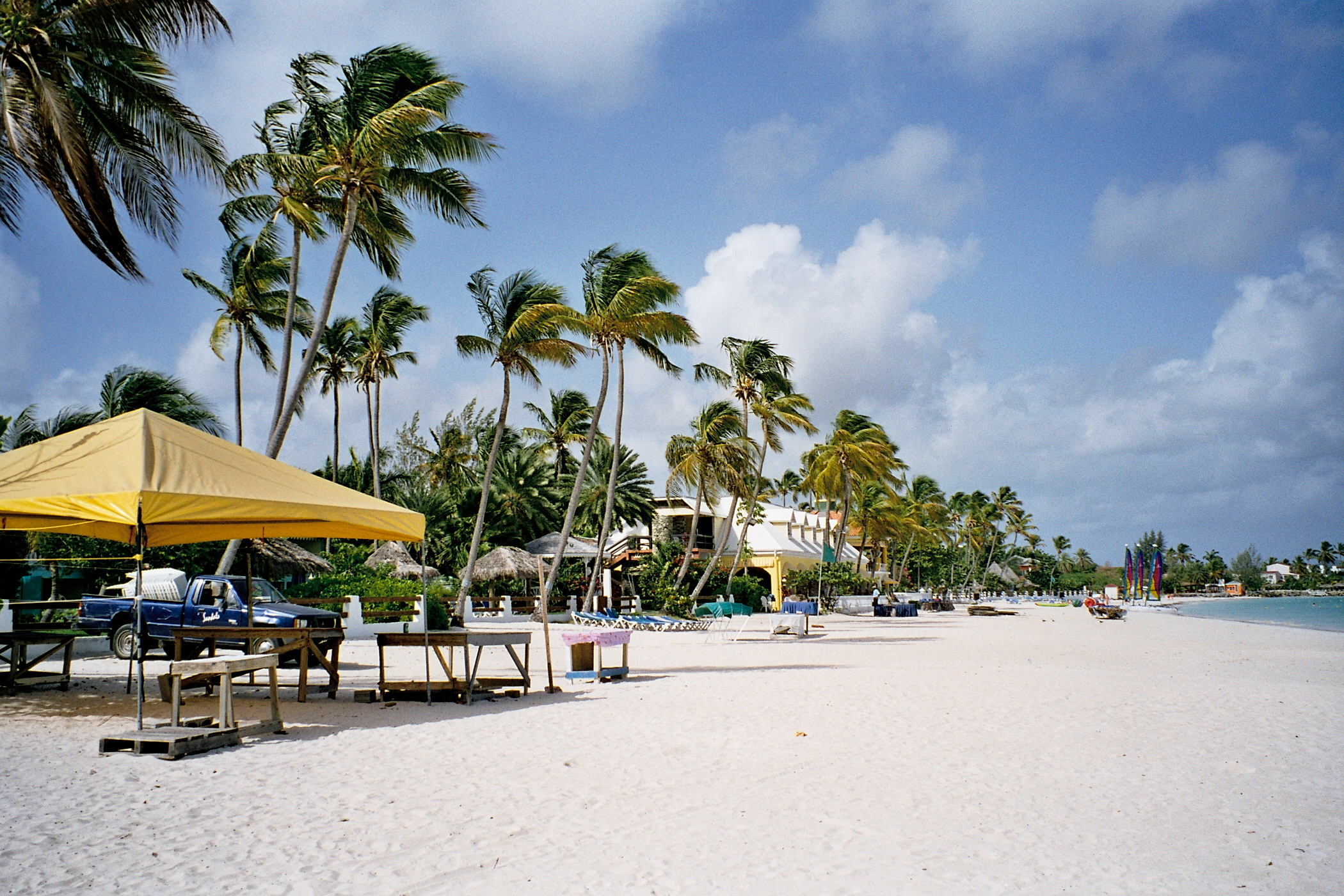
Antigua beach view

== Environmental issues ==
Like other island nations, Antigua and Barbuda faces unique environmental issues created by its proximity to the ocean, and small size. These include pressures on drinking water resources, natural ecosystems, and deforestation more generally.

Existing issues on the island are further made worse by climate change, where, not unlike other island nations affected by climate change, sea level rise and increased weather variability, create increased pressures on the communities on the islands and the land, through processes like coastal erosion and saltwater intrusion.

Not only do these issues threaten the residents of the island, but also interfere with the economy – where tourism is 80% of the GDP. The 2017 hurricane season was particularly destructive, with Hurricane Maria and Hurricane Irma, repeatedly damaging vulnerable infrastructure on the islands of Antigua and Barbuda.

== Statistics ==
Location
Antigua and Barbuda are Caribbean islands between the Caribbean Sea and the North Atlantic Ocean, east-southeast of Puerto Rico.
Geographic coordinates
17°03′N 61°48′W
Area
- Total: 442.6 km^{2} (170.9 sq mi) (Antigua 280 km^{2} (110 sq mi); Barbuda 161 km^{2} (62 sq mi))
- country comparison to the world: 205
- Land: 442.6 km^{2} (170.9 sq mi)
- Note: Includes Redonda, 1.6 km^{2} (0.62 sq mi):
Maritime claims
- Territorial sea: 12 nautical miles (22.2 km; 13.8 mi)
- Contiguous zone: 24 nautical miles (44.4 km; 27.6 mi)
- Exclusive economic zone: 110,089 km^{2} (42,506 mi^{2}) and 200 nautical miles (370.4 km; 230.2 mi)
- Continental shelf: 200 nautical miles (370.4 km; 230.2 mi) or to the edge of the continental margin
Terrain
Mostly low-lying limestone and coral islands, with some higher volcanic areas
Land use
- Arable land: 20.5%
- Permanent crops: 2.3%
- Permanent pasture: 9.1%
- Forest: 22.3%
- Other: 57.2% (2011)
Irrigated land
1.3 km^{2} (0.50 sq mi) (2012)
Total renewable water resources
0.05 km^{3} (0.012 cu mi) (2011)
Freshwater withdrawal (domestic/industrial/agricultural)
- Total: 0.01 km^{3} (0.0024 cu mi)/yr (63%/21%/15%)
- Per capita: 97.67 m^{3} (128 cu yd)/yr (2005)
Environment - current issues
Water management, a major concern because of limited natural fresh water resources, is further hampered by the clearing of trees to increase crop production, causing rainfall to run off quickly
Environment
international agreements
- Party to: Biodiversity, Climate Change, Climate Change-Kyoto Protocol, Desertification, Endangered Species, Environmental Modification, Hazardous Wastes, Law of the Sea, Marine Dumping, Nuclear Test Ban, Ozone Layer Protection, Ship Pollution, Wetlands, Whaling
Geography - note
Antigua has a deeply indented shoreline with many natural harbors and beaches. Antigua's southernmost point is Cape Shirley.
Barbuda has a large western harbor.

== Extreme points ==
=== Antigua ===
- Northernmost point – Boon Point
- Easternmost point - Man of War Point, Green Island
- Easternmost point (mainland only) - Neck of Land
- Southernmost point - Nanton Point
- Southernmost point (including Redonda) - headland on southern coast of Redonda (also the southernmost point in Antigua and Barbuda)
- Westernmost point - Five Islands
- Westernmost point (including Redonda) - headland on Western coast of Redonda (also the westernmost point in Antigua and Barbuda)
- Westernmost point (mainland only) - Pearns Point
- Lowest point: Caribbean Sea: 0 m
- Highest point: Boggy Peak: 402 m (1,319 ft)

=== Barbuda ===
- Northernmost point – Goat Point (also the northernmost point in Antigua and Barbuda)
- Easternmost point – unnamed headland on eastern coast (also the easternmost point in Antigua and Barbuda)
- Southernmost point – Coco Point
- Westernmost point – Cedar Tree Point
- Highest point – the northern edge of the eastern plateau (44.5m)
