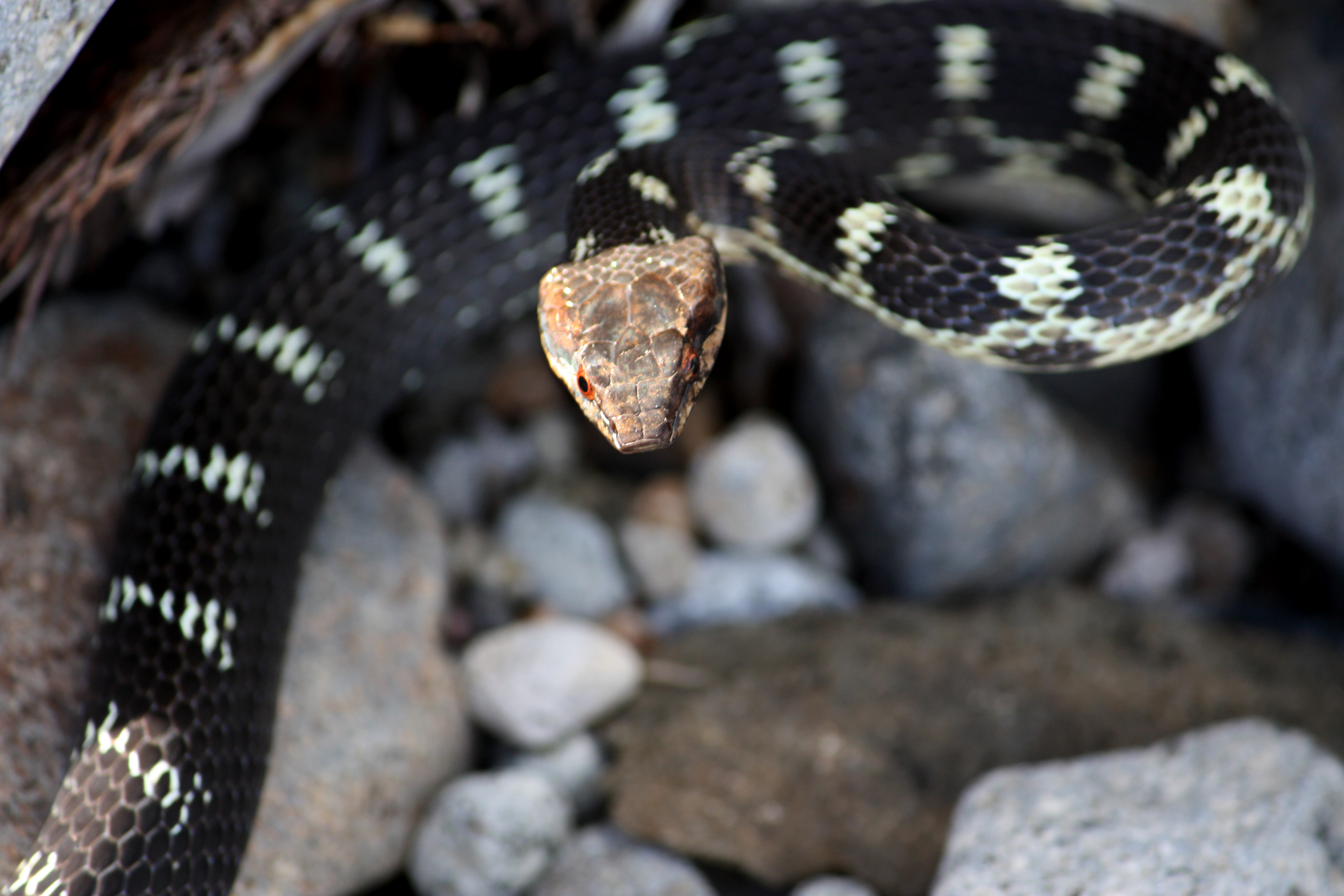

Conservation status
- Critically Endangered (IUCN 3.1)

Scientific classification
- Kingdom: Animalia
- Phylum: Chordata
- Class: Reptilia
- Order: Squamata
- Suborder: Serpentes
- Family: Colubridae
- Genus: Alsophis
- Species: A. antillensis

Binomial name
- Alsophis antillensis Schlegel, 1837

Synonyms
- Psammophis antillensis Dromicus antillensis Dromicus leucomelas

= Alsophis antillensis =

Species of snake

Alsophis antillensis, also known as the Guadeloupe racer, Antilles racer, or Leeward racer, is a species of snake endemic to the Caribbean islands of Guadeloupe and Dominica. This species was placed on the IUCN Red List of Threatened Species in 2015 and is labeled as Critically Endangered.

== Description ==
The Alsophis antillensis can reach nearly a meter in length. These racers are non-venomous and known for their agility and speed. These snakes are excellent hunters due to their speed and elusive prey. These snakes also appear in varying colors and patterns including browns, grays, and reds to allow them to blend into their natural habitats.

== Diet ==
This snake feeds on lizards, frogs, birds, and small mammals. It rarely bites humans, but may release a foul-smelling, though harmless, cloacal secretion when disturbed.

== Predation ==
These snakes are primarily diurnal. Even though they are non-venomous, their constricting abilities allow them to be an effective predator. When threatened, these snakes displaying loud hissing and striking to ward off potential threats. Due to their fast nature, these snakes can flee quickly, allowing them to avoid predators and their agile nature allows them to be excellent hunters.

== Distribution ==
The genus Alsophis is endemic to the Lesser Antilles. Alsophis antillensis is a terrestrial snake endemic to the Caribbean islands of Guadeloupe (Grande-Terre and Basse-Terre) and Marie-Galante.

== Taxonomy ==
Alsophis antillensis is a species in the genus Alsophis or Caribbean Racers. This group of snakes has a somewhat complicated taxonomic history. Other species that were previously considered synonyms or subspecies of A. antillensis but are now considered separate species include:

- Alsophis sibonius from Dominica
- Alsophis manselli from Montserrat
- Alsophis antiguae from Antigua (extinct except for a population on Great Bird Island and reintroductions on Rabbit, Green and York Islands)
- Alsophis danforthi from Terre-de-Bas (sometimes considered synonymous with A. sanctonum, which is found on Terre-de-Haut)
- Borikenophis portoricensis from Puerto Rico and the Virgin Islands
