= Antille =

Antille may refer to:

- Charles-Albert Antille (1944–2024), Swiss businessman and politician
- Emmanuelle Antille (born 1972), Swiss video artist
- I predatori delle Antille (English release: Sexy Pirates; 1999), the Italian release of an American erotic drama film

== See also ==
- Antilles (disambiguation)
