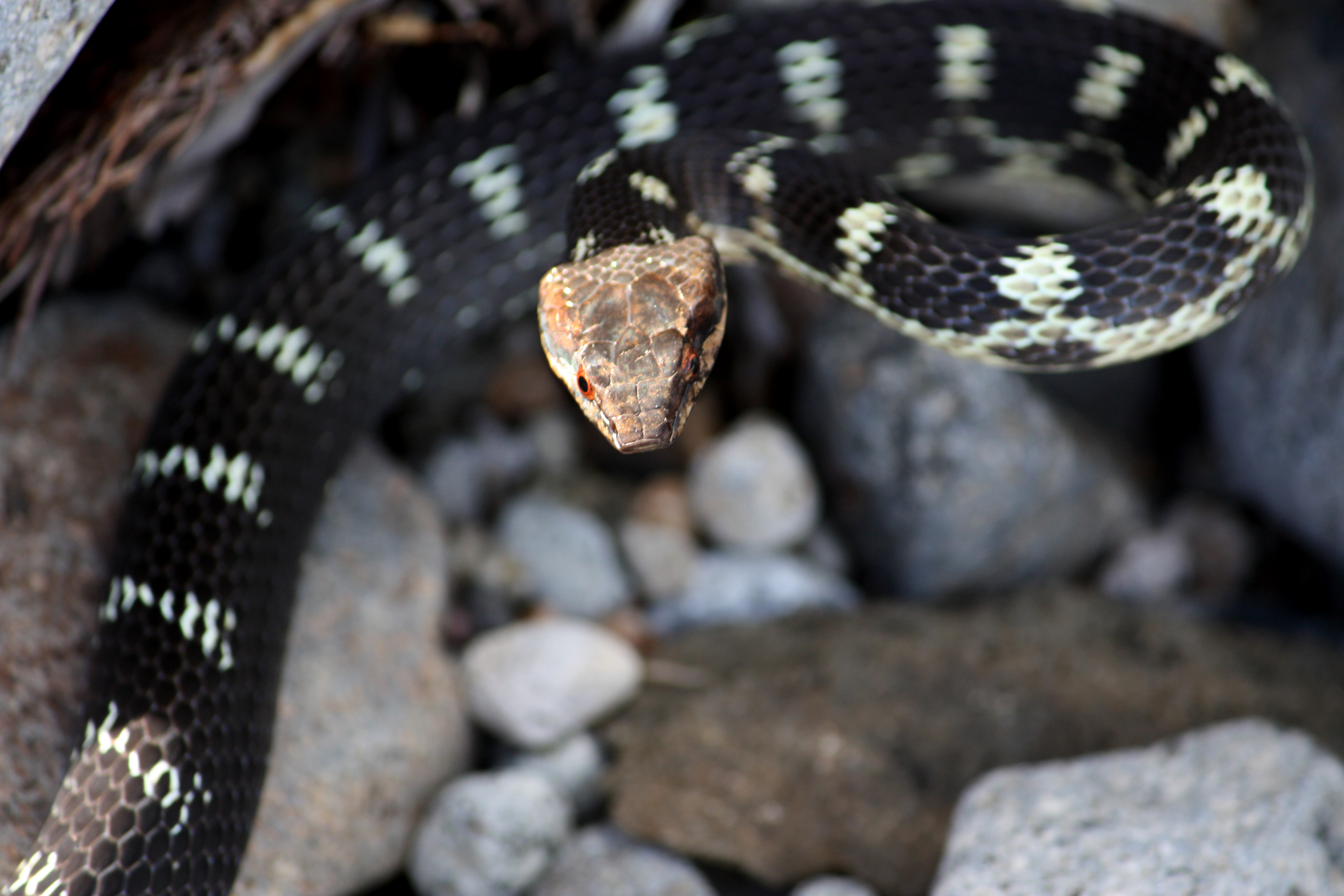
- Alsophis antillensis

Scientific classification
- Kingdom: Animalia
- Phylum: Chordata
- Class: Reptilia
- Order: Squamata
- Suborder: Serpentes
- Family: Colubridae
- Subfamily: Dipsadinae
- Genus: Alsophis; Fitzinger, 1843

Species
- 8, see text

Synonyms
- Dromicus

= Alsophis =

Genus of snakes

Alsophis is a genus of snakes in the subfamily Dipsadinae of the family Colubridae. Species in the genus Alsophis are among those snakes commonly called "racers". Alsophis species are endemic to the Lesser Antilles in the Caribbean. One species in the genus Alsophis, A. antiguae, is one of the world's rarest known snakes. Snakes of the genus Alsophis are small and rear-fanged, and they are considered harmless to humans. This genus contains nine described species which are recognized as being valid. Several species once included in this genus have been placed in the genera Borikenophis and Pseudalsophis.

== Rarity of species ==
Alsophis antiguae is the rarest snake in the genus Alsophis. This snake once occurred on Antigua and Barbuda, but by 1995, only 50 individuals remained on Great Bird Island, off the coast of Antigua. Following the removal of invasive alien predators and successful reintroductions to a further three islands (Rabbit in 1999, Green Island in 2001, and York Island in 2008), the total population has increased to more than 1,000 individuals.

== Description ==
Snakes of the genus Alsophis are all relatively small, usually less than about 1 m (3.3 ft) in body length. Females tend to be larger than males. these racers are rear-fanged, with enlarged teeth at the rear of their upper jaws.

== Behavior ==
Alsophis species are harmless to humans and most have a gentle temperament. They are diurnal, usually active from dawn to dusk.

== Species ==
Listed alphabetically by specific name.

- Alsophis antiguae Parker, 1933 – Antiguan racer
- Alsophis antillensis (Schlegel, 1837) – Antilles racer, Guadeloupe racer, Leeward racer
- Alsophis cantherigerus
- Alsophis danforthi Cochran, 1938
- Alsophis manselli Parker, 1933 – Montserrat racer
- Alsophis rijgersmaei Cope, 1869 – Anguilla racer, Anguilla Bank racer, Leeward Islands racer
- Alsophis rufiventris (A.M.C. Duméril, Bibron & A.H.A. Duméril, 1876) – orange-bellied racer, red-bellied racer, Saba racer
- Alsophis sanctonum Barbour, 1915
- Alsophis sibonius Cope, 1879 – Antilles racer, Dominica racer, Dominican racer, Leeward racer

Nota bene: A binomial authority in parentheses indicates that the species was originally described in a genus other than Alsophis.
