= Antilles (disambiguation) =

Antilles may refer to:

== Places ==
- Antilles, a group of islands in the Caribbean Sea
  - Greater Antilles
  - Lesser Antilles
    - Leeward Antilles
    - Netherlands Antilles

== Arts and media ==
- Antilles Records, an American record label
- Radio Antilles, a radio station founded in 1963, that was located on the island of Montserrat
- Three unrelated characters in the Star Wars universe:
  - Wedge Antilles, a Rebel pilot in the Star Wars universe
  - Raymus Antilles, a Rebel captain in Star Wars: Episode IV – A New Hope
  - Bail Antilles, a senator mentioned in Star Wars: Episode I – The Phantom Menace

== Animal species ==
Several species are named for the Antilles:

- Antilles catshark (Galeus antillensis), a cartilaginous fish
- Antilles monkey, a tribe of extinct primates
- Antilles racer (Alsophis antillensis), a species of snake
- Antilles pinktoe (Avicularia versicolor), a species of spider

== Other uses ==
- Antilles Current, a warm water current
- Antilles War, a war between the United Kingdom and the Kingdom of France during 1782
- SS Antilles, a French ocean liner built in 1952 and wrecked in 1971
- SS Antilles, an American passenger-cargo ship built in 1907 and sunk by a U-boat in 1917
- Radeon HD 6990 GPU, codenamed Antilles; see Radeon HD 6000 series

== See also ==
- Antille (disambiguation)
