= Antilles racer =

There are two species of snake named Antilles racer:

- Alsophis antillensis, endemic to the Caribbean island of Guadeloupe
- Alsophis sibonius, endemic to the Caribbean island of Dominica
