= Devil's Bridge (disambiguation) =

Devil's Bridge is a name applied to many bridges.

Devil's Bridge may also refer to:

- Devil's Bridge (Welsh bridge), bridge in Ceredigion, Wales.
  - Devil's Bridge, Ceredigion, village named after a local bridge in Wales
    - Devil's Bridge railway station, serving the village
- Devil's Bridge (Antigua and Barbuda), a natural arch in Antigua
- Teufelsbrücke, 'Devil's Bridge', in the Schöllenen Gorge, Canton of Uri, Switzerland
- a natural bridge on the tidal island of Worm's Head, Rhossili, Wales
- Devil's Bridge, a novel by Linda Fairstein
