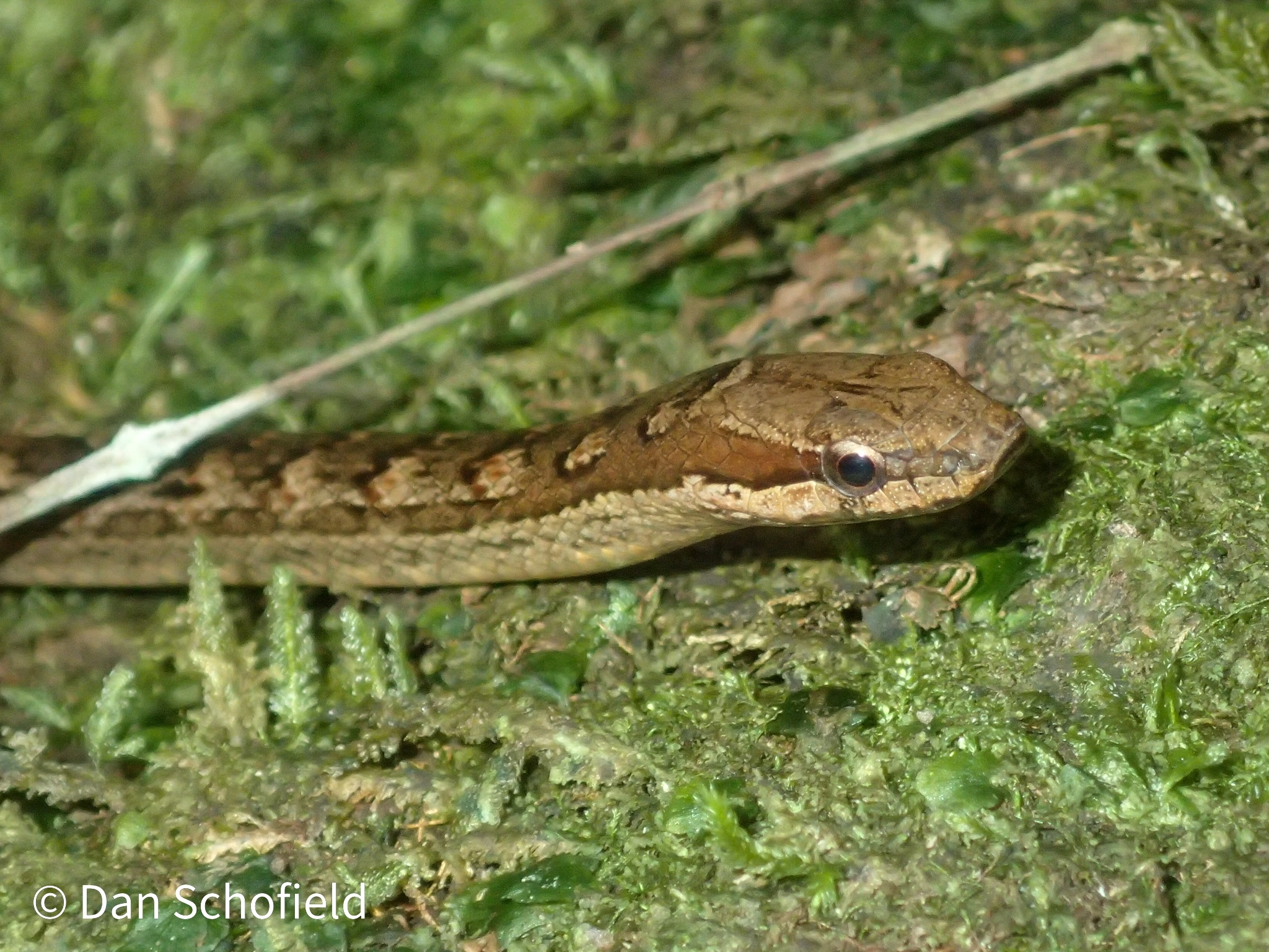

Conservation status
- Vulnerable (IUCN 3.1)

Scientific classification
- Kingdom: Animalia
- Phylum: Chordata
- Class: Reptilia
- Order: Squamata
- Suborder: Serpentes
- Family: Colubridae
- Genus: Alsophis
- Species: A. rufiventris

Binomial name
- Alsophis rufiventris (Duméril, Bibron & Duméril, 1854)

Synonyms
- Dromicus rufiventris Duméril, Bibron & Duméril, 1854

= Red-bellied racer =

Species of snake

The red-bellied racer (Alsophis rufiventris), also known as the Saba racer, black racer or orange-bellied racer, is a species of snake belonging to the family Colubridae. This snake is endemic to the Lesser Antilles in the Caribbean, where it is found on the islands of Saba, Sint Eustatius, Saint Kitts, and Nevis.

== Taxonomy ==
The red-bellied racer was first formally described as Dromicus rufiventris in 1854 by the French zoologists André Marie Constant Duméril, Gabriel Bibron and Auguste Duméril with its type locality given erroneously as "Brasil". This is a species in the genus Alsophis which is classified within the tribe Alsophiini of the subfamily Dipsadinae of the family Colubridae.

== Description ==
The red-bellied racer is a medium-sized snake with a maximum snout-vent length of 92 cm (36 in), although they may attain 150 cm (59 in). The background colour on the back is various shades from grey through to brown. There are dark brown stripes running from the snout through the eyes onto the furthest front part of the back. In males, the pattern on the back consists of diffuse, black-bordered, brown blotches on the middle of the back, fading into an ill-defined wide, dark middorsal stripe towards the tail. In females, there is a series of streaks and smudges which become less clear towards the tail. The underside is yellowish, gradually changing to dark brown or black towards the tail.

== Distribution ==
The red-bellied racer is found on the Lesser Antilles islands of Saba and Sint Eustatius. It has been extirpated from St Kitts and Nevis. This species is found in a wide variety of terrestrial habitats.
