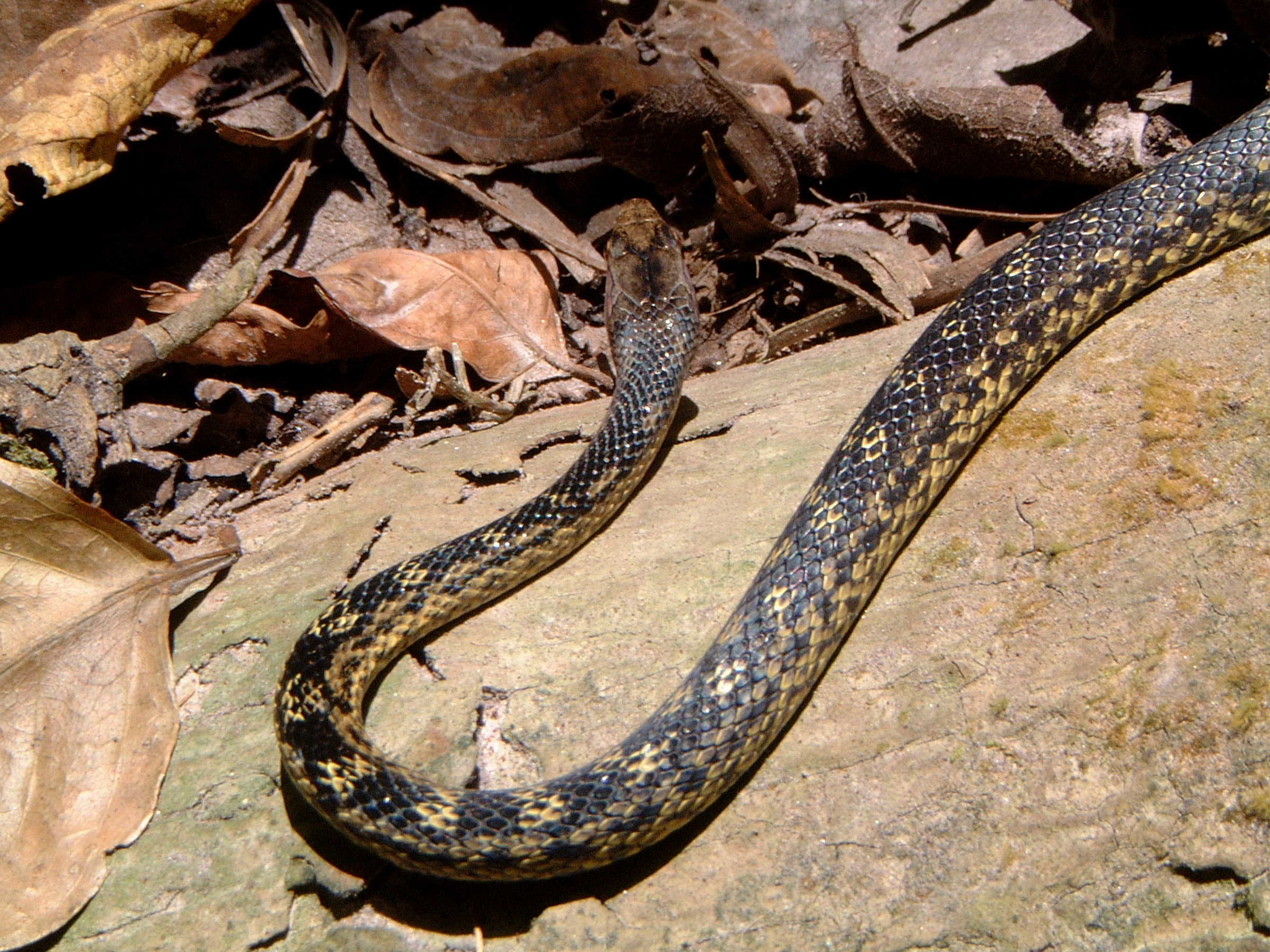

Conservation status
- Near Threatened (IUCN 3.1)

Scientific classification
- Kingdom: Animalia
- Phylum: Chordata
- Class: Reptilia
- Order: Squamata
- Suborder: Serpentes
- Family: Colubridae
- Genus: Alsophis
- Species: A. manselli

Binomial name
- Alsophis manselli Parker, 1933

= Alsophis manselli =

Species of snake

Alsophis manselli, the Montserrat racer, is a species of snake endemic to the Caribbean island of Montserrat.

== Description ==
The Montserrat racer can reach nearly a meter in length. It feeds on lizards and small rodents. It rarely bites humans, but may release a foul-smelling (though harmless) cloacal secretion when disturbed.

== Taxonomy ==
Along with Alsophis sibonius from Dominica, it was previously considered a subspecies of Alsophis antillensis.
