= North Coast, Barbuda =

North Coast
- District
- Coordinates: 17°42′25″N 61°50′55″W
- Country: Antigua and Barbuda
- Island: Barbuda

Area
  - Total: 11.05 km^{2} (4.27 sq mi)

North Coast is an administrative district of Barbuda. It has an area of 11.05 square kilometres and is composed of Goat Island, Kid Island, and Rabbit Island.
