= Codrington Island =

Uninhabited island off the coast of Antigua

- Location within Antigua and Barbuda Location within Lesser Antilles Location within the Caribbean

Geography
- Location: Caribbean
- Coordinates: 17°6′9″N 61°42′21″W

Administration
- Antigua and Barbuda

Additional information
- Time zone: AST (UTC-4)

Location of Codrington Island

Codrington Island is a small uninhabited island situated off the northeast coast of Antigua, within Mercers Creek Bay in Antigua and Barbuda. The island lies approximately 50 metres (160 ft) from the Antiguan mainland and about 100 metres (330 ft) from Rooms Estate

== Location and landscape ==
Codrington Island lies on the north-east coast of Atlantic, in the Mercers Creek Bay in about 50 meters (160 ft) from the Antigua shore and approximately 100 meters (330 ft) of the town Rooms Estate. Nearby islands include Pelican Island to the north and Crump Island to the northwest. The small inlet which is detached from the Mercers Creek Bay by Codrington Island and lies immediately southward to island is called Lords Cove.

Codrington Island is about 400 meters (1,300 ft) long and maximum 300 meters (980 ft) wide with a bay in the west with a small companion islet there. It rises only a few meters (feet) above the sea level, is covered by tropical shrubland and has no beach.

== History ==
The island derived its name from the Codrington family, who were among the leading planters of the island and prominent colonial administrators of Antigua and Barbuda. Members of the family controlled the island of Barbuda from the late 17th century until the 19th century, administering it as a plantation estate. The family name remains attached to several geographic features in the country, including the settlement of Codrington on Barbuda.

== Protected status ==
Codrington Island forms part of the North East Marine Management Area (NEMMA), a protected coastal zone established in 2006 to conserve marine ecosystems, coral reefs, mangroves, and wildlife habitats along Antigua’s northeastern coast. The designation provides a framework for environmental protection and sustainable use of marine resources within approximately 78 km² of coastal waters.

The island remains uninhabited and is owned by the Crown as part of the national coastal estate of Antigua and Barbuda.
