= Hell's Gate Island =

Island in Antigua and Barbuda

- Location within Antigua and Barbuda Location within Lesser Antilles Location within the Caribbean

Geography
- Location: Caribbean
- Coordinates: 17°08′28″N 61°43′19″W
- Archipelago: Leeward Islands, Lesser Antilles

Administration
- Antigua and Barbuda

Additional information
- Time zone: AST (UTC-4)

Hells Gate Island is a small island located in Antigua close to Great Bird Island. It is known for its unique natural formation of a narrow channel, called Hell's Gate, that runs between the island and the mainland. Hells Gate Island is a popular tourist destination.

== See also ==
- Devil's Bridge, Antigua and Barbuda
