= Goat Island (Barbuda) =

Island in Antigua and Barbuda

- Location within Antigua and Barbuda Location within Lesser Antilles Location within the Caribbean

Geography
- Location: Caribbean Sea
- Coordinates: 17°42′19″N 61°51′06″W

Administration
- Antigua and Barbuda

Additional information
- Time zone: AST (UTC-4)

Goat Island is an uninhabited island off the northern coast of Barbuda. It is the northernmost island in Antigua and Barbuda. The island is a proposed conservation site and is bounded to the south by Codrington Lagoon, a protected area. The island is considered a wetland and is partly forested. Goat Island, along with Rabbit Island and Kid Island, make up the North Coast district. It is part of the Codrington geological formation.
