= Cape Shirley =

Southernmost point on the island of Antigua

Location of Cape Shirley within Antigua and Barbuda

Cape Shirley is the southernmost point on the island of Antigua in the nation of Antigua and Barbuda. It is located at 17°0′0″N 61°45′0″W between the Caribbean Sea and the Atlantic Ocean.
