= Moor Island =

Uninhabited island in the Kivalliq Region, Nunavut, Canada

- Location within Nunavut Location within Canada

Geography
- Location: Chesterfield Inlet
- Coordinates: 63°31′N 91°12′W
- Archipelago: Arctic Archipelago

Administration
- Canada
- Nunavut: Nunavut
- Region: Kivalliq

Demographics
- Population: Uninhabited

Moor Island, formerly Moore Island, is one of the uninhabited Arctic Archipelago islands in Kivalliq Region, Nunavut, Canada. It is one of the several islands located in Chesterfield Inlet.
