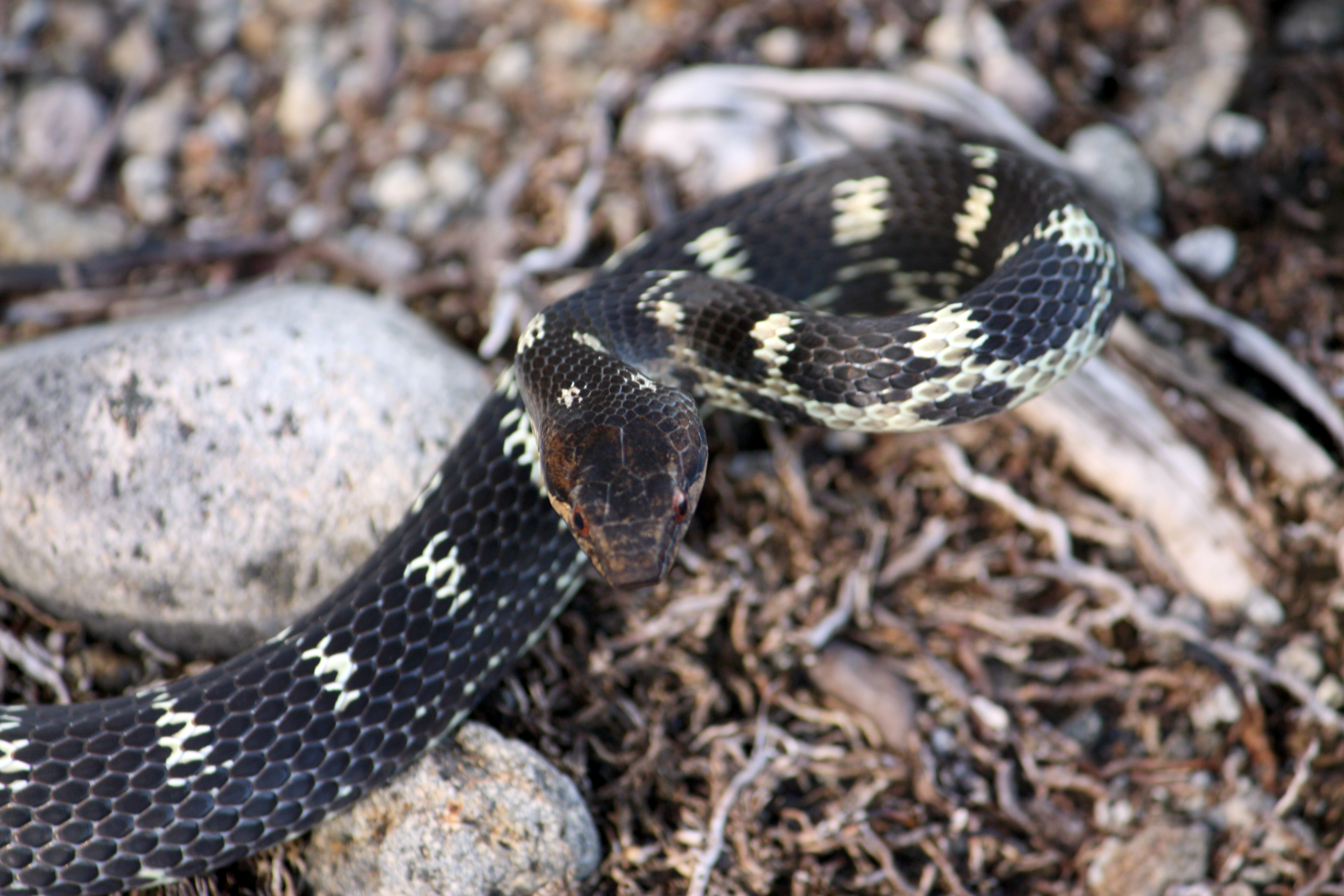
- In Rosalie, Dominica.

Conservation status
- Least Concern (IUCN 3.1)

Scientific classification
- Kingdom: Animalia
- Phylum: Chordata
- Class: Reptilia
- Order: Squamata
- Suborder: Serpentes
- Family: Colubridae
- Genus: Alsophis
- Species: A. sibonius

Binomial name
- Alsophis sibonius Cope, 1879

= Alsophis sibonius =

Species of snake

Alsophis sibonius, the Dominica racer, Dominican racer, or Antilles racer, is a species of snake endemic to the Caribbean island of Dominica.

== Description ==
It can reach nearly a meter in length. It feeds on lizards and small rodents. It rarely bites humans, but may release a foul-smelling (though harmless) cloacal secretion when disturbed.

== Taxonomy ==
Along with Alsophis manselli from Montserrat, it was previously considered a subspecies of Alsophis antillensis.
