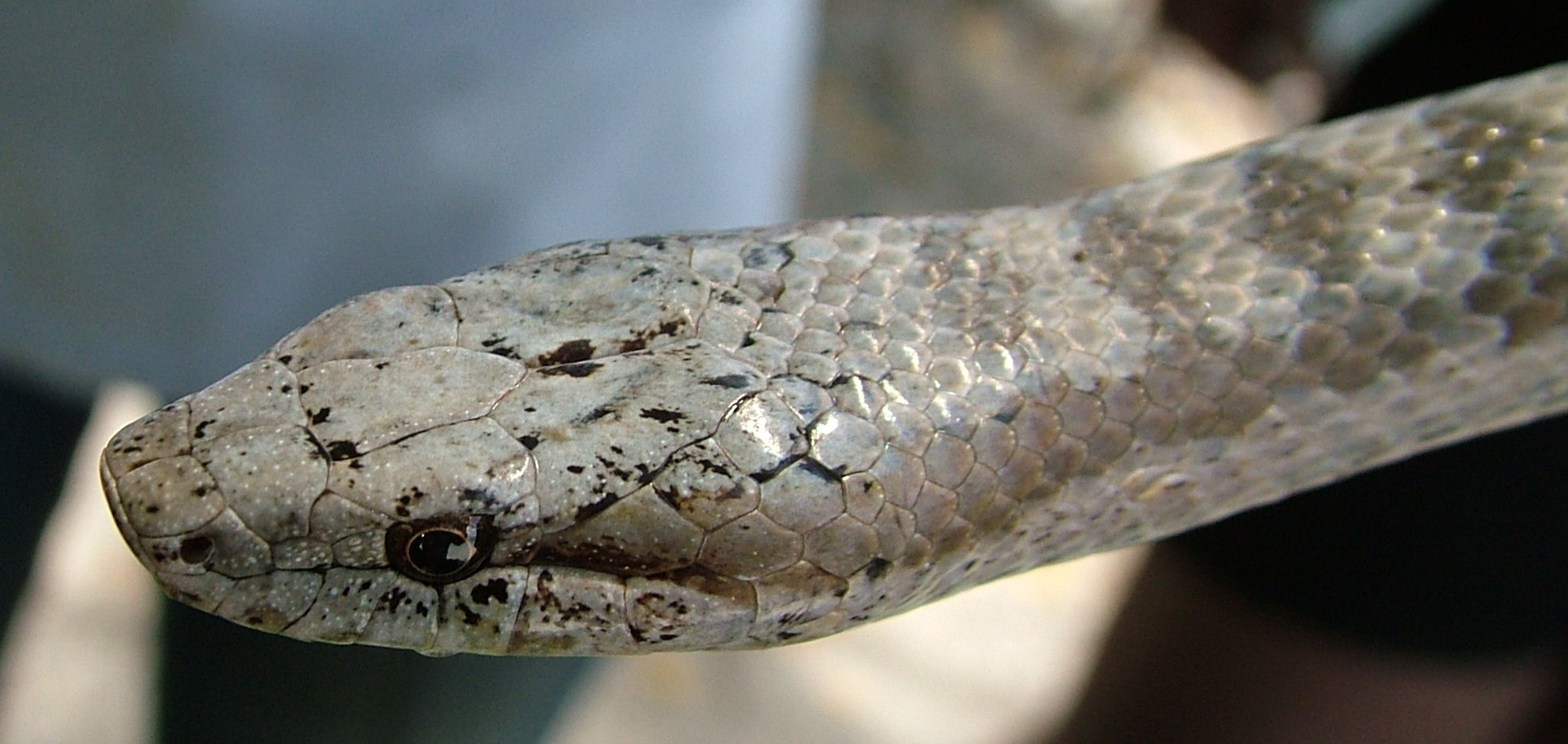

Conservation status
- Critically Endangered (IUCN 3.1)

Scientific classification
- Kingdom: Animalia
- Phylum: Chordata
- Class: Reptilia
- Order: Squamata
- Suborder: Serpentes
- Family: Colubridae
- Genus: Alsophis
- Species: A. antiguae

Binomial name
- Alsophis antiguae Parker, 1933
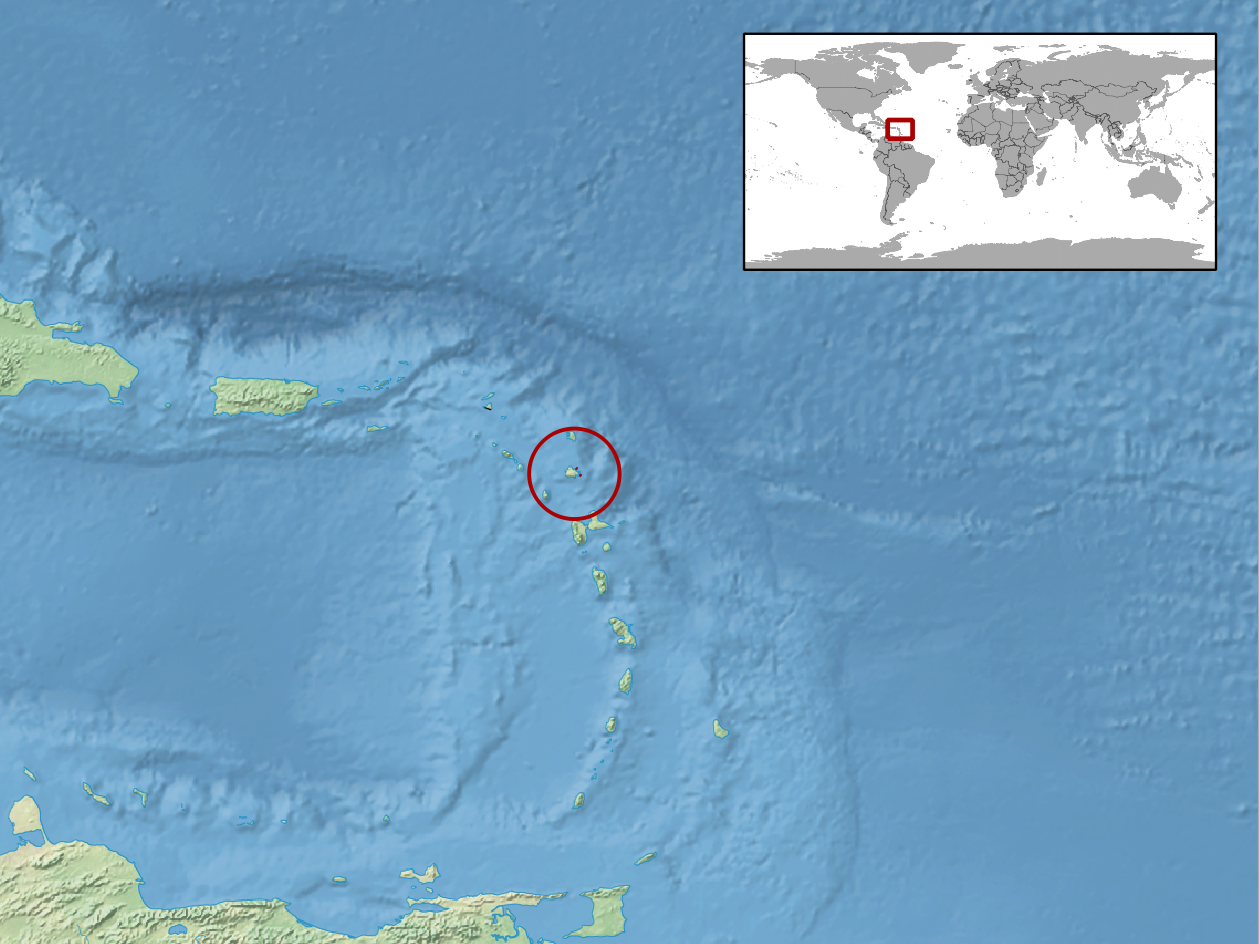

= Antiguan racer =

Species of snake

The Antiguan racer (Alsophis antiguae) is a harmless rear-fanged (opisthoglyphous) grey-brown snake that was until recently found only on Great Bird Island off the coast of Antigua, in the eastern Caribbean. It is among the rarest snakes in the world. In the year 1995 researchers estimated that only 51 Antiguan racer snakes were alive on the Great Bird Island. However, in the last 20 years, conservation efforts have boosted numbers from an estimated 50 to over 1,100 individuals by eradicating non-native predators and reintroducing the snake to other Antiguan islands in its original range. In addition to Great Bird Island, the Antiguan racer has successfully recolonised the nearby Rabbit Island, Green Island, and York Island.

== Taxonomy ==
The Antiguan racer is a snake that belongs to the family Colubridae, which includes about half of the world's known snake species. It belongs to the genus Alsophis, which contains several species of West Indian racers. Many West Indian racers are threatened or extinct.

== Description ==
This racer exhibits sexual dimorphism. The adult racer is typically about 1 m long, with females being larger than the males. Young adult males are usually dark brown with light creamy markings, while young females are silvery-gray with pale brown patches and markings. Females also have larger heads than the males. However, older individuals of both sexes can be highly variable in colour hue and pattern, and are frequently heavily speckled or blotched in a range of hues, including white, taupe, reddish brown, brown, and black.

== Distribution and habitat ==
The Antiguan racer originally inhabited Antigua and Barbuda and probably all of the islands on the Antigua Bank. By 1995, the species was found only on Great Bird Island, a small island 2.5 km off of the northeast coast of Antigua. The island is extremely small at only 8.4 hectares. The Antiguan racer prefers to live in shady woodlands with dense undergrowth, although it is also found on sandy beaches and rocky outcrops.

== Ecology and behavior ==
The Antiguan racer is harmless to humans and has a gentle temperament. It is diurnal, being active from dawn to dusk. At night, it rests in a hidden shelter. The Antiguan racer appears to have poor resistance to common snake mites, which are not naturally found in Antigua, which has ended some attempts at captive breeding.

The racer primarily eats a diet of lizards, including the local Antiguan ground lizard. While the species sometimes hunts for its food, it is typically an ambush predator, waiting for prey with most of its body buried beneath leaves.

== Relationship with humans ==
In the centuries before the Europeans arrived in Antigua, the Antiguan racers were numerous and widespread. The thick forest that covered the islands teemed with lizards, the snakes' favored prey, and the racer had no natural predators to threaten it.

In the late 15th century, European settlers began to colonize and develop Antigua and Barbuda for huge plantations of sugarcane. The ships that brought slaves to the island (and those that also or instead carried away rum or other tropical products) also brought rats. Feasting on the sugarcane and, among other things, the eggs of the Antiguan racer, the rat population rocketed.

The plantation owners, desperate to rid themselves of the rats, introduced Asian mongooses to kill the rats. However, they failed to realize that black rats (Rattus rattus) are mainly nocturnal, while the mongooses prefer to hunt during the day. The mongooses preyed heavily on the native ground-nesting birds, frogs, lizards, and Antiguan racers. Within 60 years, the snake had vanished completely from Antigua and most of its offshore islands, and many believed that it had become extinct.

However, a few Antiguan racers survived on a tiny mongoose-free island known as Great Bird Island. A 3-month survey by conservation biologists from Fauna & Flora International found only 50 individuals alive in 1995.

Conservation work quickly got under way with the eradication of rats, which threatened the racers on Great Bird Island. The effort succeeded. In 1996, five adult racers were collected and sent to the Jersey Zoo for the first attempt at captive breeding. The female racers laid 11 eggs with five hatching, but proved to be difficult to keep in captivity due to their feeding habits and low resistance to diseases. Nine of the 10 captive racers died because of the common snake mite.

However, the eradication of rats and mongooses on Great Bird Island led to a population increase, with the number of racers on the island doubling in two years. However, 20% of the racers were underweight because of the lack of prey lizards to maintain the population levels. Efforts began to clear other offshore islands of Antigua of rats and mongooses to reintroduce the snake so the population could continue to grow. Antiguan racers have been successfully reintroduced to Rabbit Island (1999), Green Island (2001), and York Island (2008), and their total population has increased to more than 1,000.

The Antiguan racer was recently threatened by hurricanes, such as Hurricane Luis, Hurricane Georges, and Hurricane Irma, and now by deliberate killing by humans (despite being protected by law), flooding, drought, and inbreeding due to low genetic diversity.
