= Charles-Albert Antille =

Swiss politician (1944–2024)

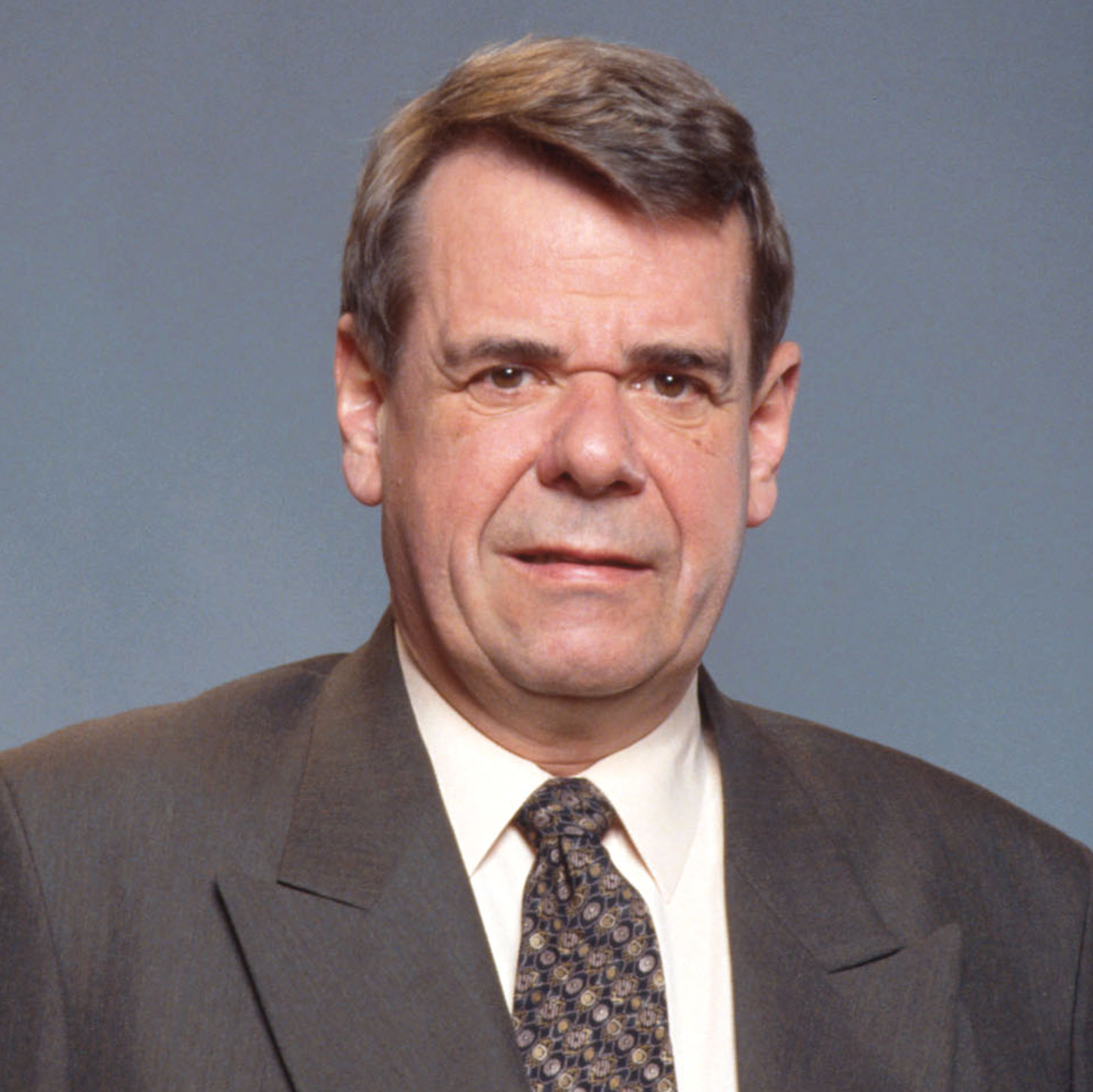
- Antille in 1998 or 1999

Member of the Swiss National Council for Valais
- In office 27 April 1998 – 30 November 2003
- Preceded by: Pascal Couchepin

Personal details
- Born: 18 October 1944 Sierre, Switzerland
- Died: 4 June 2024 (aged 79)
- Party: PRD
- Occupation: Businessman

Charles-Albert Antille (18 October 1944 – 4 June 2024) was a Swiss businessman and politician of the Radical Democratic Party (PRD).

== Biography ==
Born in Sierre on 18 October 1944, Antille's father was from Anniviers and his mother was from Oberwallis. He grew up in Saint-Luc. He completed his studies in Sierre and took part in a business apprenticeship in Brig-Glis. He went on to work for AMAG Automobil- und Motoren and the Groupe Mutuel.

Antille served on the communal council of Sierre from 1985 to 2001. In 1992, he was elected president of Sierre. He served in this position until 2000, when he was defeated by Manfred Stucky. From 1998 to 2003, he served in the National Council. He joined the legislature succeeding Pascal Couchepin, who joined the Federal Council. He was described as a left-wing radical by the Neue Zürcher Zeitung. He did not stand for re-election in 2003.

Antille died on 4 June 2024, at the age of 79.
