= Rugby union in Antigua and Barbuda =

Rugby union in Antigua and Barbuda is a minor but growing sport. They are currently unranked by World Rugby.

== Governing body ==
Antigua and Barbuda's governing body is not a member of World Rugby or NACRA, although it does have some dealings with the latter.

== History ==
Like many small island groups, Antigua and Barbuda has a population problem. The main sport is cricket, and the national population is under 100,000.

The British first introduced the game to the islands, and for a number of years it was mainly played by expatriates. Now it has some uptake by the local population.

Games against visiting ships, and touring sides are common, as well as against neighbouring Caribbean islands.

Antigua competes in the Caribbean Rugby Championship, a tournament which includes Trinidad and Tobago, Bermuda, Martinique, the Cayman Islands, Jamaica, the Bahamas, British Virgin Islands, and Guyana.

== See also ==
- Antigua and Barbuda national rugby union team
