= List of football clubs in Antigua and Barbuda =

This is a list of football (soccer) clubs in Antigua and Barbuda.

== Cingular Wireless Premier Division ==
- Bassa
- Hoppers
- Parham
- Sap
- Empire
- Villa Lions
- Freemansville
- All Saints United
- Potters
- Liberta
- Grenades
