= Emmanuelle Antille =

Swiss video artist (b. 1972)

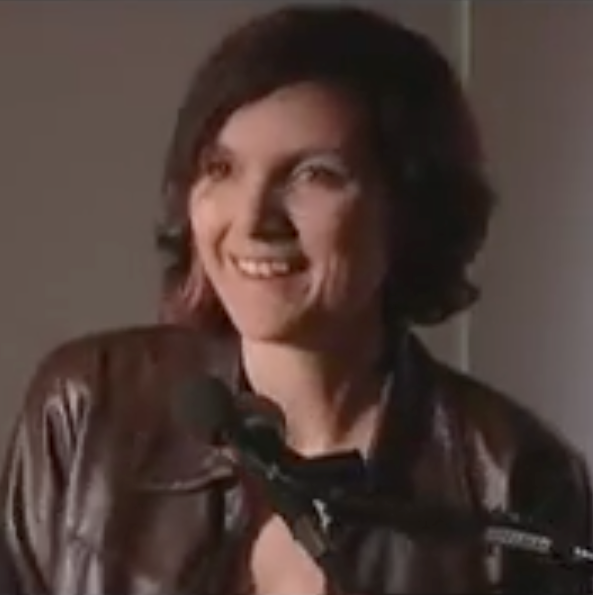
- At the Brooklyn Museum in 2007
- Born: 1972 (age 53–54); Lausanne, Switzerland
- Education: Geneva University of Art and Design, Rijksakademie van beeldende kunsten
- Occupations: Video artist, Film director, Educator

Emmanuelle Antille (born 1972) is a Swiss video artist, film director, and educator.

== Biography ==
Emmanuelle Antille, born in Lausanne in 1972. She completed her studies at the Geneva University of Art and Design in 1996, and the Rijksakademie van beeldende kunsten in Amsterdam.

Since 1995, she has been developing her artistic practice as both a video artist and a film director. Her work has been exhibited in numerous museums and art galleries, including the Frankfurter Kunstverein, The Renaissance Society, the National Gallery of Iceland, the Centre for Contemporary Arts, and the Tokyo Wonder Site, among others.

She is also a professor at the Geneva University of Art and Design. Antille represented her country at the 50th Venice Biennale in 2003, showcasing her work in the national pavilion. She directed her third feature film, Avanti, in 2012. The film starred Hanna Schygulla and Miou-Miou.

Antille's debut documentary, A Bright Light – Karen And The Process, premiered at the Visions du Réel festival in 2018.

== Filmography ==
- 2003: Angels Camp
- 2005: Rollow
- 2012: Avanti
- 2018: A Bright Light - Karen and the Process
