= Devil's Bridge (Antigua and Barbuda) =

Natural rock arch in Antigua and Barbuda

Devil's Bridge National Park
- IUCN category V (protected landscape/seascape)
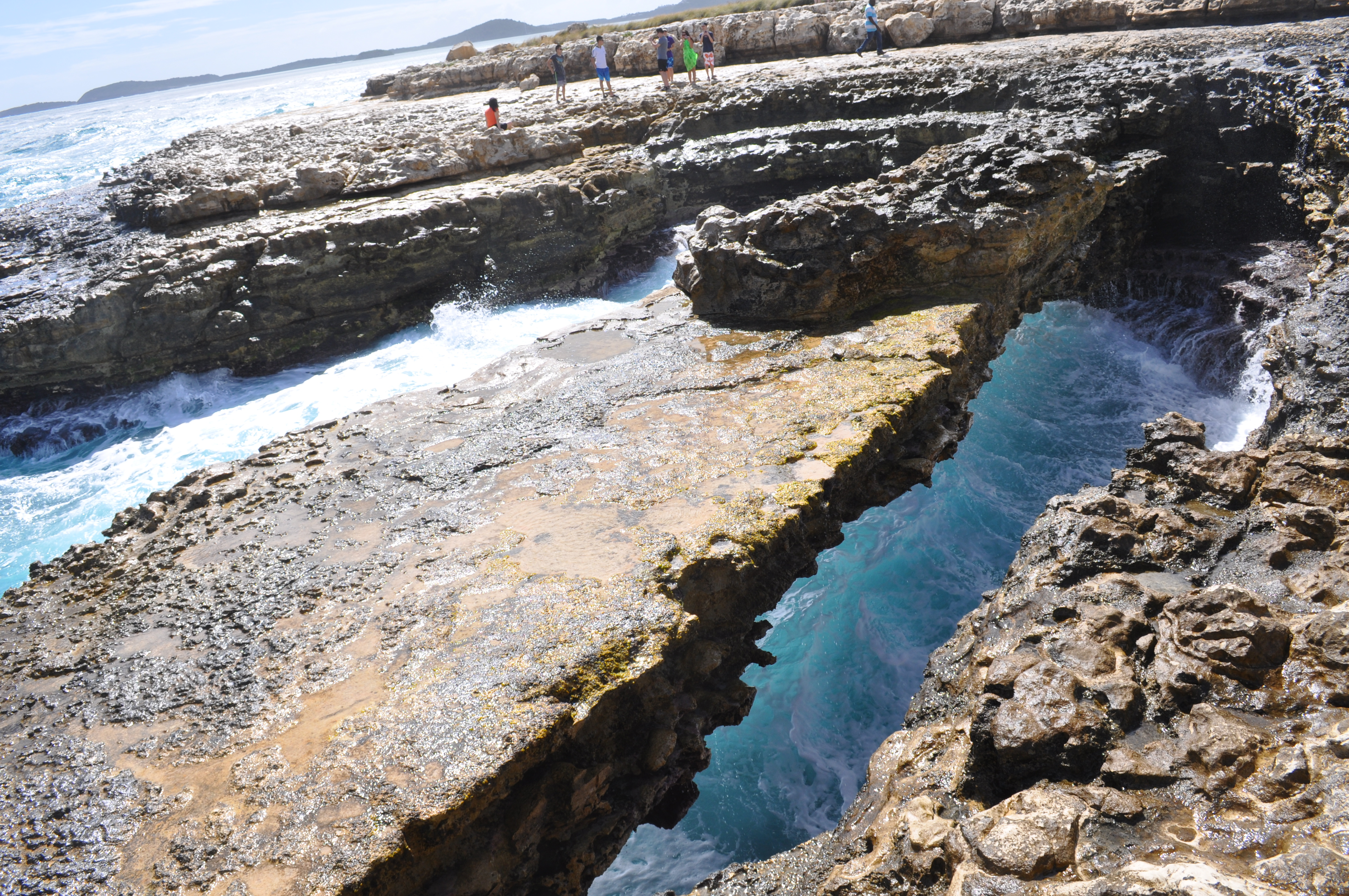
- Devils Bridge, Antigua
- Interactive map of Devil's Bridge National Park
- Location: Antigua and Barbuda
- Established: 2008

Devil's Bridge National Park is a natural rock arch in eastern Antigua. It is located on the Atlantic coast at 17°6′1.7″N 61°40′42.2″W, near Indian Town Point to the east of Willikies. The area around the arch features several natural blowholes which shoot up water and spray powered by waves from the Atlantic Ocean. This particular location is exposed to waves that are pushed by the Trade Winds with no land between here and Europe. Nearby popular local swimming spots such as Long Cove are sheltered by an offshore reef acts as a natural breakwater. In 2008 it was declared National Park.

== See also ==
- Hell's Gate Island
