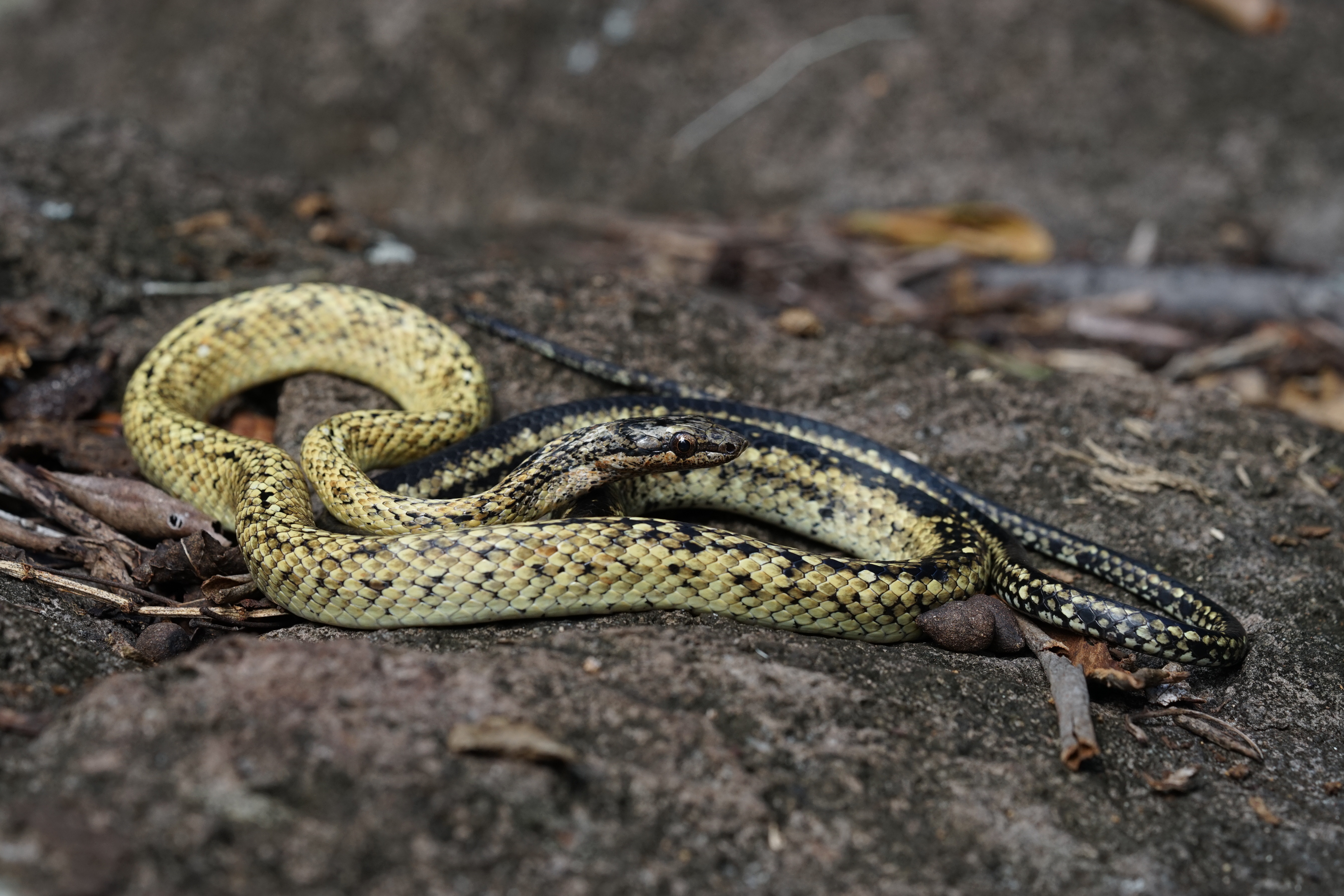

Scientific classification
- Domain: Eukaryota
- Kingdom: Animalia
- Phylum: Chordata
- Class: Reptilia
- Order: Squamata
- Suborder: Serpentes
- Family: Colubridae
- Genus: Alsophis
- Species: A. danforthi

Binomial name
- Alsophis danforthi Cochran, 1938

= Alsophis danforthi =

Species of snake

Alsophis danforthi is a species of snake endemic to the Caribbean island of Îles des Saintes, in the Guadeloupe archipelago.
