= Mercers Creek Bay =

Bay in northeast Antigua

Coordinates: 17°06′N 61°43′W

Location of Mercers Creek Bay within Antigua and Barbuda

Mercers Creek Bay (formerly Belfast Bay) is a large bay in the northeast of Antigua. The settlements of Willikies and Seatons lie close to the bay, which is protected from the Atlantic Ocean by a string of small islands, the largest of which is Crump Island.
