= Pelican Island (Antigua and Barbuda) =

Island in Antigua and Barbuda

- Location within Antigua and Barbuda Location within Lesser Antilles Location within the Caribbean

Geography
- Location: Caribbean
- Coordinates: 17.1054°N 61.7046°W
- Archipelago: Leeward Islands, Lesser Antilles
- Area: 1.3 km^{2} (0.50 sq mi)

Administration
- Antigua and Barbuda

Additional information
- Time zone: AST (UTC-4)
- Private island

Pelican Island is a small private island located off the northeast coast of Antigua, at the eastern end of Mercers Creek Bay and immediately to the east of Crump Island.

== Geography ==
Pelican Island has an area of about 1.3 km^{2}. The island lies only about 137 metres from Antigua. This proximity also means that Antiguan infrastructures of power reach Pelican Island.

== History ==
The island was one of the Antiguan properties involved in the Allen Stanford case. The financier was said to have acquired the island, along with Guana Island in 2008 for $17 million, subsequently inflating its value by flipping. In 2012 The Telegraph included the island among "The world's best private islands for sale".
