= Prickly Pear Island =

Island in Antigua and Barbuda

- Location within Antigua and Barbuda Location within Lesser Antilles Location within the Caribbean

Geography
- Location: Caribbean
- Coordinates: 17°10′34″N 61°47′52″W

Administration
- Antigua and Barbuda

Additional information
- Time zone: AST (UTC-4)

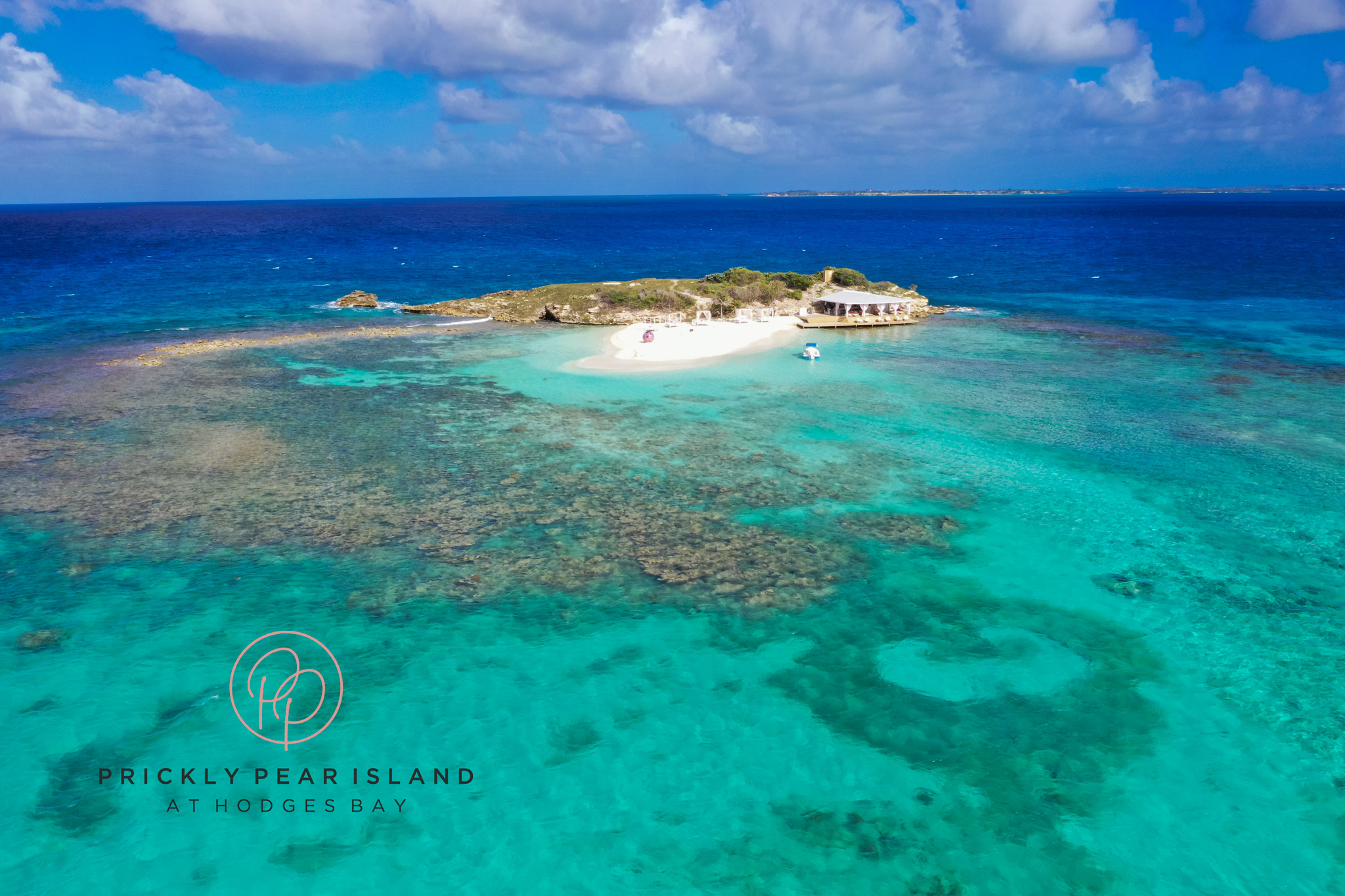
Aerial view of Prickly Pear Island

Prickly Pear Island is an islet approximately 650 metres off the north shore coast of Hodges Bay on the much larger island of Antigua, West Indies. The island measures about 50 metres north to south and 50 metres east to west. and its area is 2500 sq meters ( 26 910 sq ft )The small uninhabited island is home to the Prickly Pear Beach Club at Hodges Bay, a favorite day-time escape for the celebrity elite.
