= York Island (Antigua and Barbuda) =

Island off Antigua

Coordinates: 17.0533°N 61.6695°W

Location of York Island within Antigua and Barbuda.

York Island is an island in the Caribbean Sea that belongs to Antigua and Barbuda. It is located east of the main island of Antigua. its area is 7 ha ( 17.3 acres)

== Important Bird Area ==
The island forms part of Antigua’s Offshore Islands Important Bird Area (IBA), designated as such by BirdLife International because it supports significant populations of various bird species, including West Indian whistling-ducks, brown pelicans, laughing gulls, and least and royal terns.
