= Crump Island =

Island in Antigua and Barbuda

- Location within Antigua and Barbuda Location within Lesser Antilles Location within the Caribbean

Geography
- Location: Caribbean
- Coordinates: 17°06′32″N 61°43′03″W
- Archipelago: Leeward Islands, Lesser Antilles

Administration
- Antigua and Barbuda

Additional information
- Time zone: AST (UTC-4)

Northeast coast. Marine Reserve.
- Interactive map of Northeast coast. Marine Reserve.
- Established: 2005
- Website: Northeast Marine Management Area in Antigua and Barbuda

Crump Island is an island off the northeast coast of Antigua. It is located to the southeast of Guana Island in Belfast Bay, close to the town of Seaton's.

== Landscape ==
The island is a medium-sized of Antigua that lies in the northeastern reef zone. It is situated north of Seatons, in front of the Meadows/Coconut Hall peninsula, and between Mercers Creek Bay to the south and Guiana Bay to the north. A narrow waterway, only 50 metres wide, joins the two bays. Pelican Island in front of Rooms is located further east than what follows. It is under the administrative control of Saint Peter.

The island's width varies by about 100 metres, and its length is roughly 1½ kilometres from west to east. It is only a few dozen metres wide in certain instances. The island is about twelve hectares in total size.

== History ==
The island was formerly known as Goat Island, or simply "Goat Island," but the Crump estate, located at Coconut Hall today, gave it its name in the 18th century.

The island is uninhabited and privately owned. It has been important for the development of tourism and the preservation of the environment since the 1960s.

This area became the Crump Island Wildlife Reserve in the 1970s. A local group proposed the creation of a Crump Island Coral Reef Marine Park in the 1980s. It ought to have an educational trail, a marine aquarium, and 177 hectares of marine landscape. August 1991 was the planned opening month.

Nonetheless, the Asia Village Resort, a massive hotel complex built by Malaysian investors, was designed here, on the mainland, on Crump Island and Guiana Island, in the late 1990s. Following public outcry, the government decided not to support this project.

The island has been a part of the rather nonspecific North East Marine Management Area (NEMMA, 78 km2) since 2006. The Antiguan side islands are classified as an important area for coastal birds under the 2007 designation of Offshore Islands Important Bird Area (AG006).

In the 2010s, there was talk about a Chinese investor owning a luxury hotel and resort as part of the Antigua and Barbuda Special Economic Zone.
