= Great Bird Island (Antigua and Barbuda) =

Island off Antigua

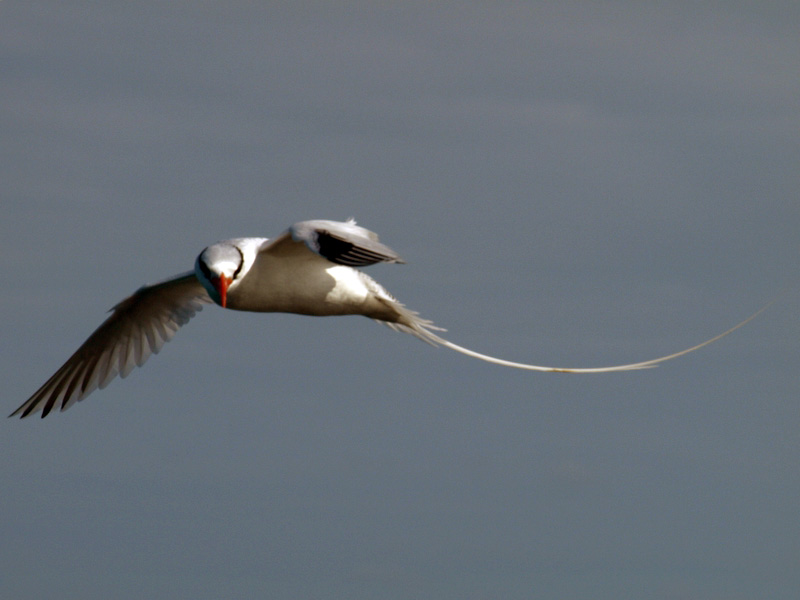
- Great Bird Island, Antigua Red-billed Tropicbirds (Phaethon aethereus).

- Location within Antigua and Barbuda Location within Lesser Antilles Location within the Caribbean

Geography
- Location: Caribbean
- Coordinates: 17°08′42″N 61°43′27″W

Administration
- Antigua and Barbuda

Additional information
- Time zone: AST (UTC-4)
- Private island
- Area: 20 acres (8.1 ha)
- Established: 2005
- Website: Northeast Marine Management Area in Antigua and Barbuda

Location of Great Bird Island within Antigua and Barbuda.

Great Bird Island is a tiny islet lying 2.5 kilometers off the northeast coast of Antigua. Measuring just 20 acres (81,000 m^{2}), it is smaller than most city parks. It is a private island but open to the public.

== Fauna ==
The island was named by sailors who were amazed at the number of birds that they found living and nesting there. It forms part of Antigua's Offshore Islands Important Bird Area (IBA), designated as such by BirdLife International because it supports significant populations of various bird species, including West Indian whistling-ducks, brown pelicans, laughing gulls, and least and royal terns.

The island is the only place on Earth where you can see an Antiguan racer (Alsophis antiguae) in the wild. It is also home to the near-threatened lizard Pholidoscelis griswoldi and red-billed tropicbirds.
