= Outline of Antigua and Barbuda =

Twin island country in the Caribbean

The Flag of Antigua and Barbuda

The Coat of arms of Antigua and Barbuda

The location of Antigua and Barbuda

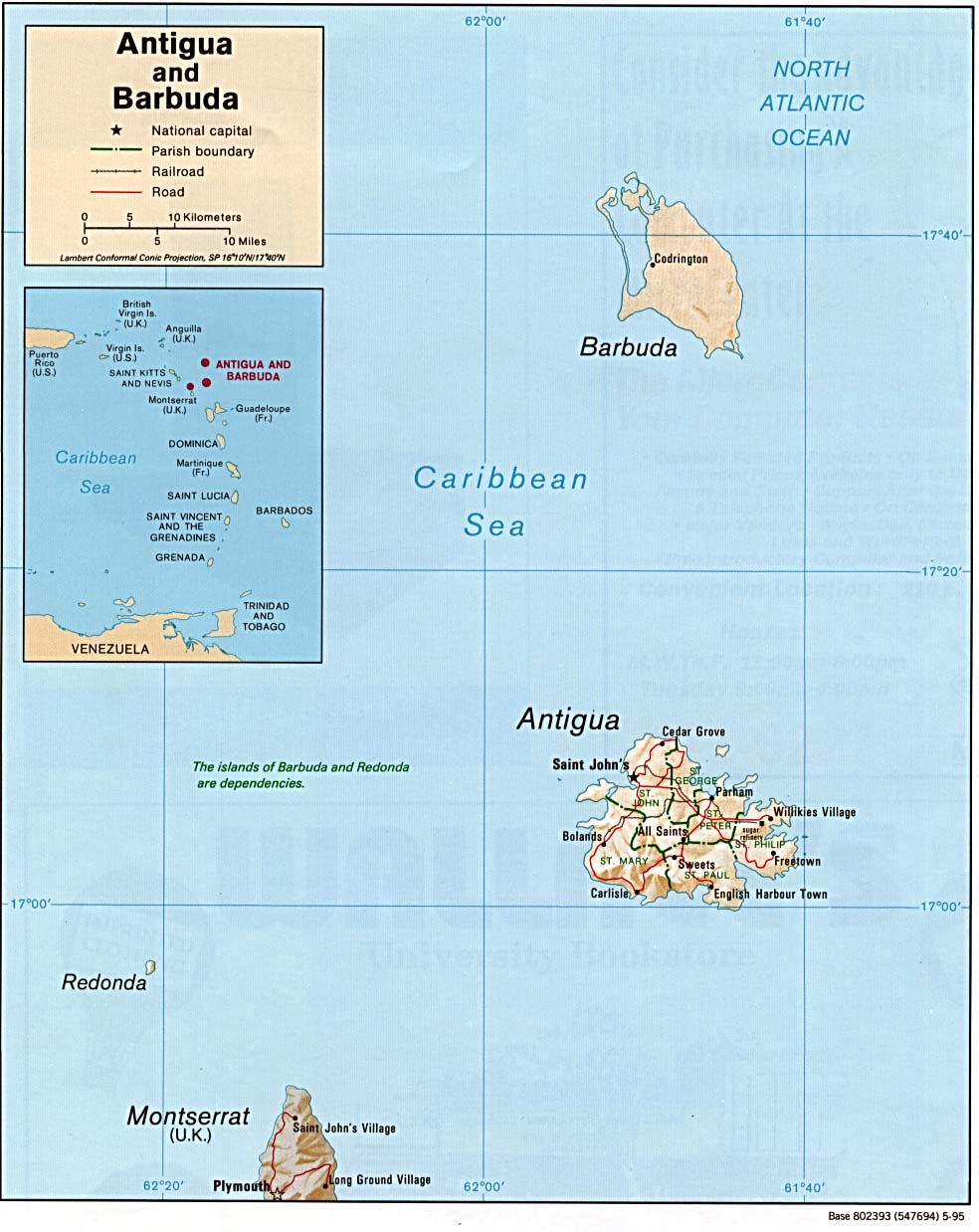
An enlargeable relief map of Antigua and Barbuda

The following outline is provided as an overview of and introduction to Antigua and Barbuda:

Antigua and Barbuda – twin-island nation lying between the Caribbean Sea and the Atlantic Ocean. It consists of two major inhabited islands, Antigua and Barbuda, and a number of smaller islands (including Great Bird, Green, Guinea, Long, Maiden and York Islands and further south, the island of Redonda). Its governance, language, and culture have all been strongly influenced by the British Empire, of which the country was formerly a part.

== General reference ==
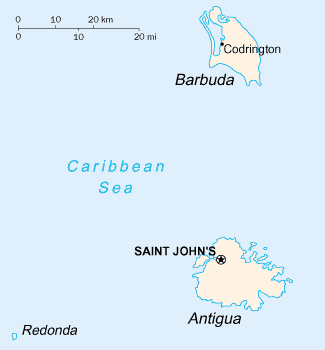
An enlargeable basic map of Antigua and Barbuda

- Pronunciation: /ænˈtiːɡə/ and /bɑːrˈbjuːdə/
- Common English country name: Antigua and Barbuda
- Official English country name: Antigua and Barbuda
- Common endonym(s):
- Official endonym(s):
- Adjectival(s): Antiguan, Barbudan
- Demonym(s):
- ISO country codes: AG, ATG, 028
- ISO region codes: See ISO 3166-2:AG
- Internet country code top-level domain: .ag

== Geography of Antigua and Barbuda ==
- Antigua and Barbuda are...
  - islands
  - a country
    - an island country
    - a nation state
    - a Commonwealth realm
- Location:
  - Northern Hemisphere and Western Hemisphere
    - North America (off the East Coast of the United States, southeast of Puerto Rico)
  - Atlantic Ocean
    - Caribbean
      - Antilles
        - Lesser Antilles (island chain)
          - Leeward Islands
  - Time zone: Eastern Caribbean Time (UTC-04)
  - Extreme points of Antigua and Barbuda
    - High: Boggy Peak 402 m (1,319 ft)
    - Low: Caribbean Sea 0 m
  - Land boundaries: none
  - Coastline: 153 km
- Population of Antigua and Barbuda: 84,522+(2008) - 198th most populous country
- Area of Antigua and Barbuda: 280 square kilometres (110 sq mi) - 198th largest country
- Atlas of Antigua and Barbuda

=== Environment of Antigua and Barbuda ===
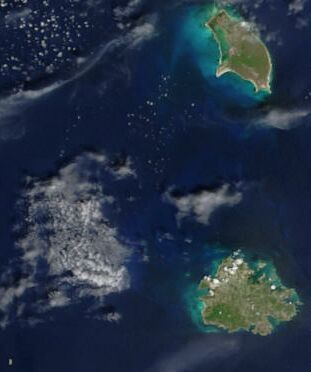
A satellite image of Barbuda and Antigua

Environment of Antigua and Barbuda

- Climate of Antigua and Barbuda
- Environmental issues in Antigua and Barbuda
- Renewable energy in Antigua and Barbuda
- Geology of Antigua and Barbuda
- Protected areas of Antigua and Barbuda
  - Biosphere reserves in Antigua and Barbuda
  - National parks of Antigua and Barbuda
- Wildlife of Antigua and Barbuda
  - Fauna of Antigua and Barbuda
    - Birds of Antigua and Barbuda
    - Mammals of Antigua and Barbuda

==== Natural geographic features of Antigua and Barbuda ====
- Beaches
- Fjords of Antigua and Barbuda
- Glaciers of Antigua and Barbuda
- Islands of Antigua and Barbuda
- Lakes of Antigua and Barbuda
- Mountains of Antigua and Barbuda
  - Volcanoes in Antigua and Barbuda
- Rivers of Antigua and Barbuda
  - Waterfalls of Antigua and Barbuda
- Valleys of Antigua and Barbuda
- World Heritage Sites in Antigua and Barbuda: None

List of ecoregions in Antigua and Barbuda

==== Administrative divisions of Antigua and Barbuda ====
outline of Antigua and Barbuda
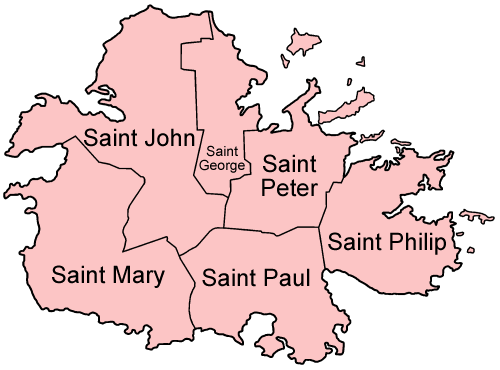

Antigua and Barbuda is an island nation made up of: Antigua island, which is divided into six parishes; and of the two dependencies of Barbuda island and Redonda island. (Note: Although Redonda is a dependency of Antigua and Barbuda, it is administered by Saint John)

- Parishes and dependencies of Antigua and Barbuda
  - Saint George
  - Saint John
  - Saint Mary
  - Saint Paul
  - Saint Peter
  - Saint Philip
  - Barbuda
  - Redonda
- Major divisions of Antigua and Barbuda
- Communities

Capital of Antigua and Barbuda: St. John's

=== Demography of Antigua and Barbuda ===
Demographics of Antigua and Barbuda

== Government and politics of Antigua and Barbuda ==
Politics of Antigua and Barbuda

- Form of government: unitary parliamentary representative democratic monarchy
- Capital of Antigua and Barbuda: St. John's
- Elections in Antigua and Barbuda
- Political parties in Antigua and Barbuda
- Taxation in Antigua and Barbuda
- Barbuda Land Acts

=== Branches of government ===
Government of Antigua and Barbuda

==== Executive branch of the government of Antigua and Barbuda ====
- Head of state: King of Antigua and Barbuda, Charles III
  - The Monarch's representative: Governor-General of Antigua and Barbuda, Rodney Williams
- Head of government: Prime Minister of Antigua and Barbuda, Gaston Browne
- Cabinet of Antigua and Barbuda

==== Legislative branch of the government of Antigua and Barbuda ====
- Parliament of Antigua and Barbuda (bicameral)
  - Upper house: Senate of Antigua and Barbuda
  - Lower house: House of Representatives of Antigua and Barbuda

==== Judicial branch of the government of Antigua and Barbuda ====
Court system of Antigua and Barbuda

- Antigua and Barbuda is a member of the Caribbean Court of Justice - but the court's date of inauguration to be the Supreme Court of Appeal has been delayed
- Judicial Committee of the Privy Council
  - Eastern Caribbean Supreme Court - based in Saint Lucia
    - High Court of Justice in Antigua and Barbuda

=== Foreign relations of Antigua and Barbuda ===
- Diplomatic missions in Antigua and Barbuda
- Diplomatic missions of Antigua and Barbuda

==== International organization membership ====
The government of Antigua and Barbuda is a member of:

- African, Caribbean, and Pacific Group of States (ACP)
- Agency for the Prohibition of Nuclear Weapons in Latin America and the Caribbean (OPANAL)
- Caribbean Community and Common Market (Caricom)
- Caribbean Development Bank (CDB)
- Commonwealth of Nations
- Food and Agriculture Organization (FAO)
- Group of 77 (G77)
- International Bank for Reconstruction and Development (IBRD)
- International Civil Aviation Organization (ICAO)
- International Criminal Court (ICCt)
- International Criminal Police Organization (Interpol)
- International Development Association (IDA)
- International Federation of Red Cross and Red Crescent Societies (IFRCS)
- International Finance Corporation (IFC)
- International Fund for Agricultural Development (IFAD)
- International Labour Organization (ILO)
- International Maritime Organization (IMO)
- International Monetary Fund (IMF)
- International Olympic Committee (IOC)
- International Organization for Standardization (ISO) (subscriber)
- International Red Cross and Red Crescent Movement (ICRM)
- International Telecommunication Union (ITU)
- International Trade Union Confederation (ITUC)
- Multilateral Investment Guarantee Agency (MIGA)
- Nonaligned Movement (NAM)
- Organisation for the Prohibition of Chemical Weapons (OPCW)
- Organization of American States (OAS)
- Organization of Eastern Caribbean States (OECS)
- United Nations (UN)
- United Nations Conference on Trade and Development (UNCTAD)
- United Nations Educational, Scientific, and Cultural Organization (UNESCO)
- Universal Postal Union (UPU)
- World Confederation of Labour (WCL)
- World Federation of Trade Unions (WFTU)
- World Health Organization (WHO)
- World Intellectual Property Organization (WIPO)
- World Meteorological Organization (WMO)
- World Trade Organization (WTO)

=== Law and order in Antigua and Barbuda ===
Law of Antigua and Barbuda

- Constitution of Antigua and Barbuda
- Crime in Antigua and Barbuda
- Human rights in Antigua and Barbuda
  - LGBT rights in Antigua and Barbuda
  - Freedom of religion in Antigua and Barbuda
- Law enforcement in Antigua and Barbuda

=== Military of Antigua and Barbuda ===
Military of Antigua and Barbuda

- Command
  - Commander-in-chief: King of Antigua and Barbuda represented by Sir Rodney Williams, Governor General of Antigua and Barbuda
    - Chief of Defence Staff
- Forces
  - Army of Antigua and Barbuda
  - Navy of Antigua and Barbuda
  - Air Force of Antigua and Barbuda
  - Cadet Corps of Antigua and Barbuda
  - Antigua and Barbuda Regiment
  - Service and Support Unit
- Military history of Antigua and Barbuda
- Military ranks of Antigua and Barbuda

=== Local government in Antigua and Barbuda ===
Local government in Antigua and Barbuda

== History of Antigua and Barbuda ==
- Timeline of the history of Antigua and Barbuda
- Current events of Antigua and Barbuda

== Culture of Antigua and Barbuda ==
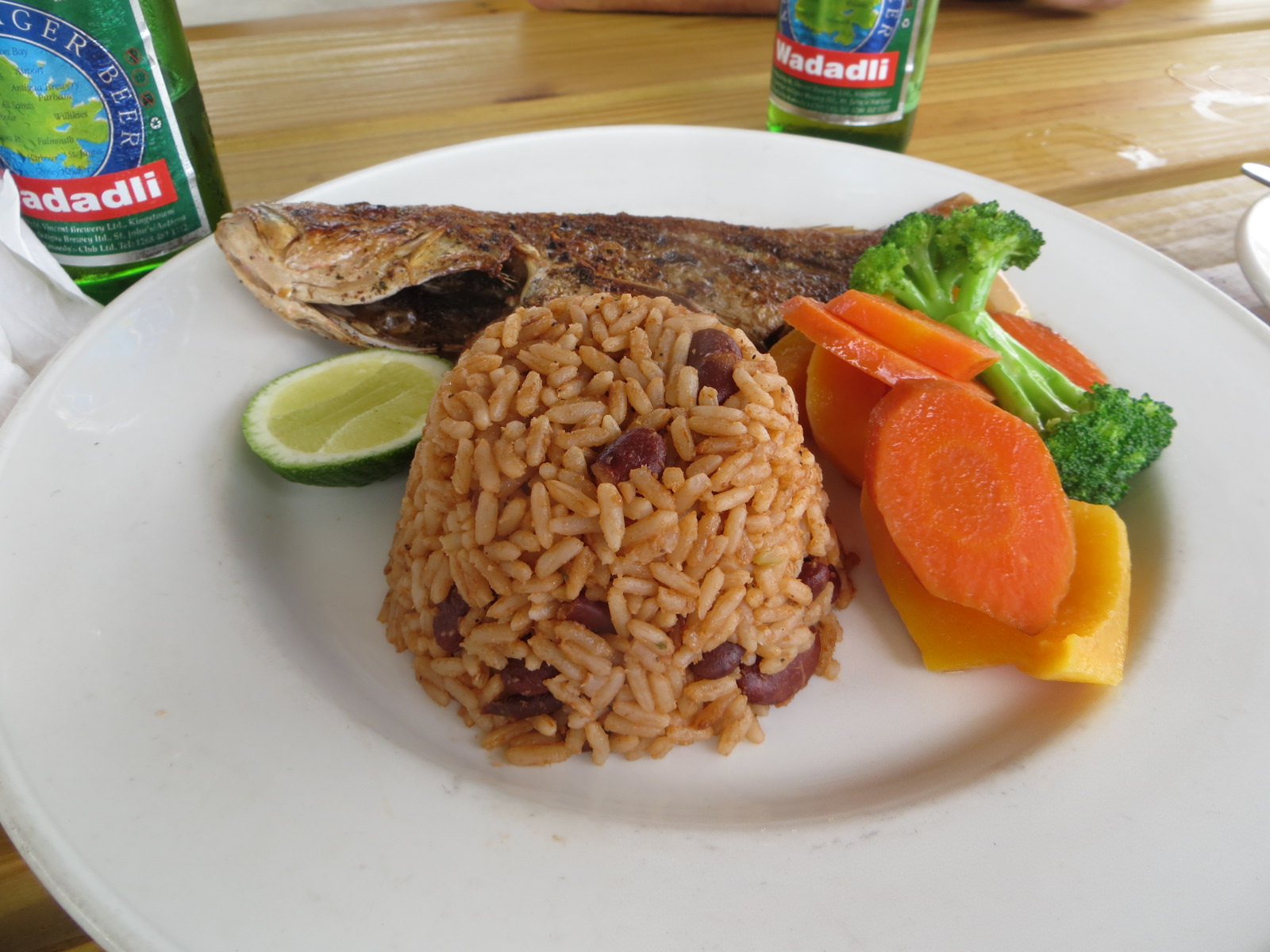
Antiguan food

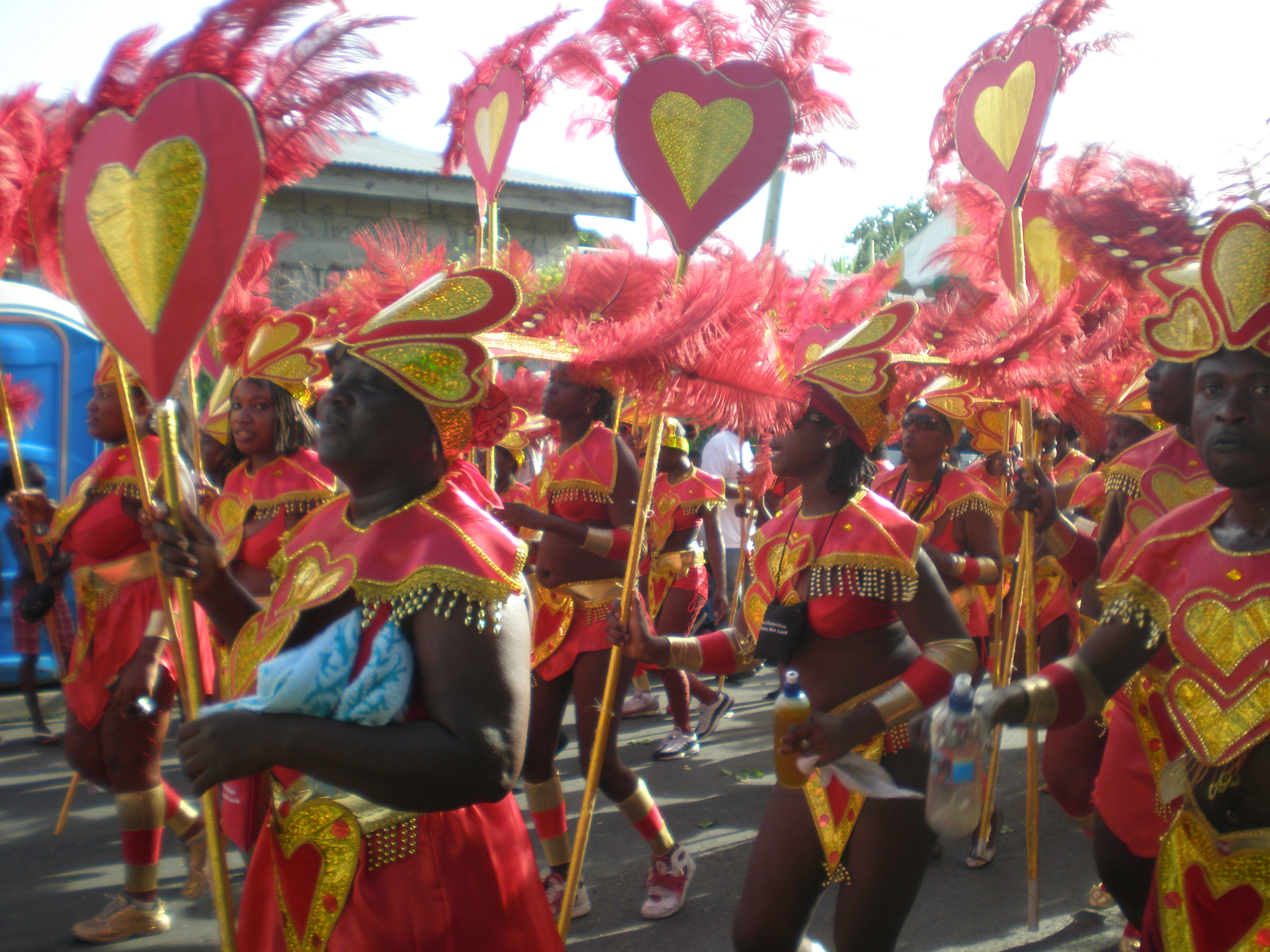
Antigua Carnival

- Architecture of Antigua and Barbuda
- Cuisine of Antigua and Barbuda
- Festivals in Antigua and Barbuda
- Languages of Antigua and Barbuda
- Media in Antigua and Barbuda
- National symbols of Antigua and Barbuda
  - Coat of arms of Antigua and Barbuda
  - Flag of Antigua and Barbuda
  - National anthem of Antigua and Barbuda
- People of Antigua and Barbuda
- Public holidays in Antigua and Barbuda
- Records of Antigua and Barbuda
- Religion in Antigua and Barbuda
  - Christianity in Antigua and Barbuda
  - Hinduism in Antigua and Barbuda
  - Islam in Antigua and Barbuda
  - Judaism in Antigua and Barbuda
  - Sikhism in Antigua and Barbuda
- World Heritage Sites in Antigua and Barbuda: None

=== Art in Antigua and Barbuda ===
- Cinema of Antigua and Barbuda
- Literature of Antigua and Barbuda
- Music of Antigua and Barbuda
- Television in Antigua and Barbuda
- Theatre in Antigua and Barbuda

=== Sports in Antigua and Barbuda ===
- Football in Antigua and Barbuda
- Antigua and Barbuda at the Olympics

== Economy and infrastructure of Antigua and Barbuda ==
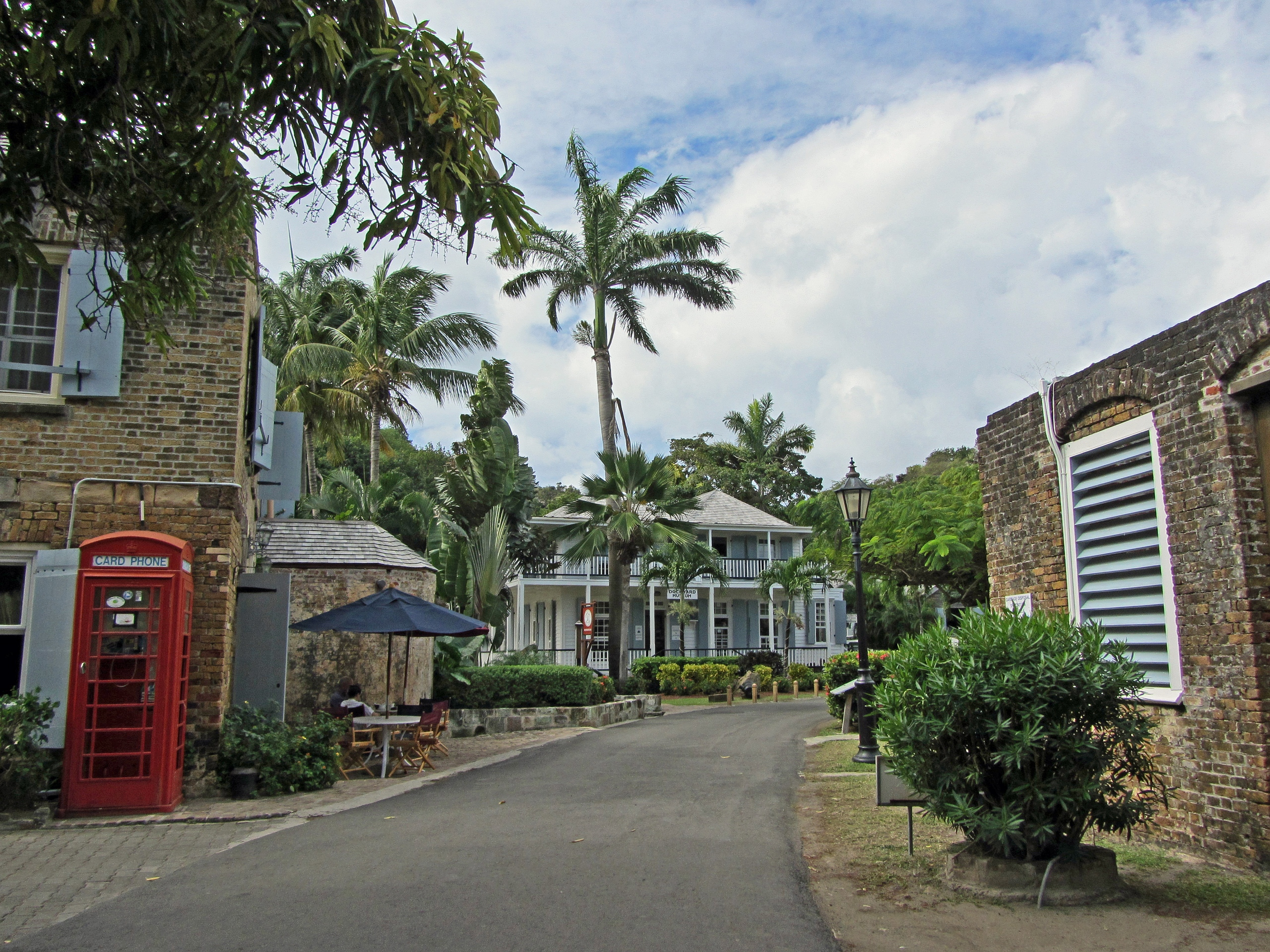
English Harbour, a major tourist destination

- Economic rank, by nominal GDP (2007): 164th (one hundred and sixty fourth)
- Communications in Antigua and Barbuda
  - Internet in Antigua and Barbuda
- Companies of Antigua and Barbuda
- Currency of Antigua & Barbuda: Dollar
  - ISO 4217: XCD
- Antigua and Barbuda Stock Exchange
- Health care in Antigua and Barbuda
- Transport in Antigua and Barbuda
  - Airports in Antigua and Barbuda
  - Rail transport in Antigua and Barbuda
- Tourism in Antigua and Barbuda
  - Visa policy of Antigua and Barbuda

== Education in Antigua and Barbuda ==
- List of schools in Antigua and Barbuda
- List of universities in Antigua and Barbuda

== See also ==
Antigua and Barbuda

- Index of Antigua and Barbuda-related articles
- List of Antigua and Barbuda-related topics
- List of international rankings
- Member state of the Commonwealth of Nations
- Member state of the United Nations
- Outline of geography
- Outline of North America
- Outline of the Caribbean
