= Military ranks of Antigua and Barbuda =

The Military ranks of Antigua and Barbuda are the military insignia used by the Antigua and Barbuda Defence Force. Being a member of the Commonwealth of Nations, Antigua and Barbuda shares a rank structure similar to that of the United Kingdom.

== Commissioned officer ranks ==
The rank insignia of commissioned officers.

Rank group	General / flag officers	Senior officers			Junior officers
Antigua and Barbuda Regiment
Antigua and Barbuda Regiment		Colonel	Lieutenant colonel	Major	Captain	First lieutenant	Second lieutenant
Antigua and Barbuda Coast Guard
Antigua and Barbuda Coast Guard		Captain	Commander	Lieutenant commander	Lieutenant	Lieutenant (junior grade)	Sub-lieutenant
Rank group	General / flag officers	Senior officers			Junior officers

=== Student officer ranks ===
Rank group	Student officer
Antigua and Barbuda Regiment
Antigua and Barbuda Regiment	Officer cadet
Antigua and Barbuda Coast Guard
Antigua and Barbuda Coast Guard	Midshipman

== Other ranks ==
The rank insignia of non-commissioned officers and enlisted personnel.

Rank group	Senior NCOs				Junior NCOs		Enlisted
Antigua and Barbuda Regiment							No insignia
Antigua and Barbuda Regiment	Warrant officer class 1	Warrant officer class 2	Staff sergeant	Sergeant	Corporal	Lance corporal	Private (or equivalent)
Antigua and Barbuda Coast Guard
Antigua and Barbuda Coast Guard	Master chief petty officer class 1	Master chief petty officer class 2	Chief petty officer	Petty officer	Leading seaman		Able seaman
Rank group	Senior NCOs				Junior NCOs		Enlisted
