= Antigua and Barbuda Cadet Corps =

Antigua and Barbuda National Cadet Corps
- Active: 1973–present
- Country: Antigua and Barbuda
- Allegiance: Antigua and Barbuda Defence Force
- Role: Military youth cadets
- Garrison/HQ: Camp Blizzard

Commanders
- Lieutenant commander: Samuel Roberts

The Antigua and Barbuda National Cadet Corps (ABNCC) is a voluntary youth organization open to students between the ages of 12 and 19 in Antigua and Barbuda. It is part of the Antigua and Barbuda Defence Force. It is sponsored by the government of Antigua and Barbuda. Its main objective is to provide training and personal development to youth through both military and community activities. The training is geared to inspire young men and women to become model citizens. Emphasis during training is based on discipline, loyalty, leadership and good citizenry. This is often acquired though a completed training course of being an active member in the Corps.

Presently, the cadet corps has around 200 active members. There are three categories in the National Cadet Corps: Sea Cadets, that follow Antigua and Barbuda Coast Guard training and ranks, Infantry Cadets, that follow Antigua and Barbuda Regiment training and ranks, and Air Cadets, that follow Antigua and Barbuda Air Wing training and ranks.

Recruit	New Students before basic training
Cadet Private/ Cadet Seaman	New Students after basic training
Cadet Lance Corporal/ Cadet Able Seaman	Students who are in the corps for at least a year
Cadet Corporal/ Cadet Leading Seaman	Students who are in the corps for at least 2 years
Cadet Sergeant/ Cadet Petty Officer	Students who are in the corps for at least 3 years
Cadet Staff Sergeant/ Cadet Chief Petty Officer	Students who are in the corps for at least 4 years

== See also ==
- Cadets (youth program)
