= National Security Council (Antigua and Barbuda) =

Agency overview
- Formed: 2006
- Jurisdiction: Antigua and Barbuda
- Annual budget: 49,062,225 XCD (2018)
- Agency executive: Trevor Thomas, National Security Adviser

The National Security Council of Antigua and Barbuda was established in 2006 by The National Security Council Act of 2006. The council serves as the government's main forum for debating issues pertaining to national security, coordinating the policies and actions of the government's departments and agencies in this area, and carrying out any duties assigned to it by legislation.

== Duties ==
Amongst its duties is establishing priorities among activities that address national security interests and requirements, ensuring the collection and collation of information and intelligence relating to Antigua and Barbuda's national security and the integration of that information and intelligence into the government's domestic, foreign, and security policies, and approving policies for departments and agencies of government to follow in relation to national security are all part of the Council's duties. The Council may also recommend to the Minister related to these policies.

The Prime Minister is required to present copies of each annual report produced by the Council to each House of Parliament, subject to section 7(2) of the 2006 act, and to state whether any information has been omitted from those copies in accordance with section 7(2). The Prime Minister may omit any item from the copy of the report presented to each House of Parliament if, following consultation with the Council and the Leader of the Opposition, it appears that the publication of that item in a report would be detrimental to the government's law enforcement agencies' ability to continue carrying out their duties.

== Membership ==
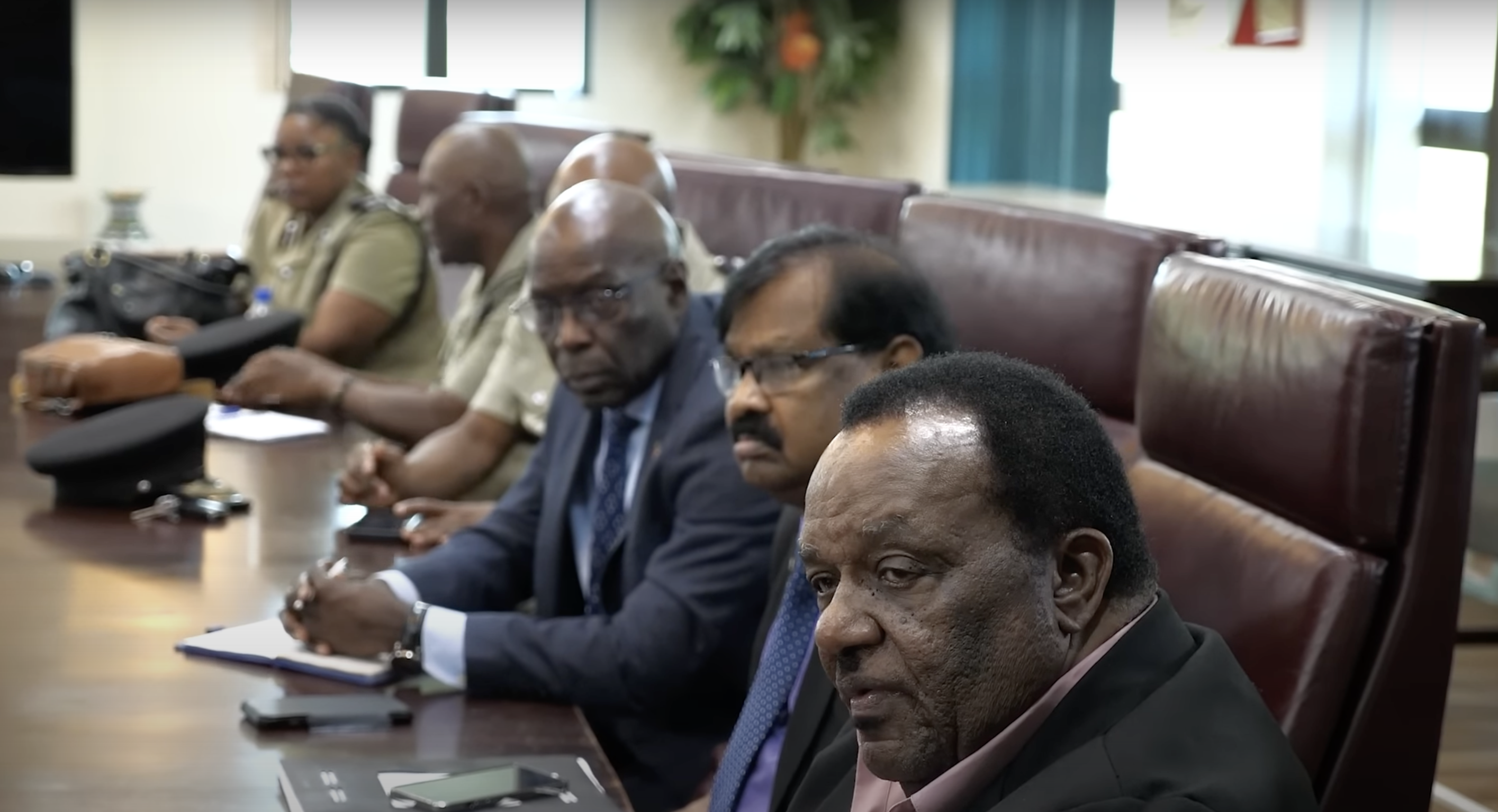
The Council discussing crime in August 2024

For as long as they occupy the designated positions, the Attorney General, National Security Adviser, Chief of Defense Staff, Commissioner of Police, and Director of the Office of National Drug and Money Laundering Control Policy are members of the group. The Prime Minister chairs Council meetings; in his absence, he appoints a ministerial member of the Council to take the helm in his absence.

The minister in charge of national security appoints a secretary to the Council, who may be either a permanent secretary or a principal assistant secretary.

Membership
Role
Prime Minister
Attorney General
National Security Adviser
Chief of Defence Staff
Commissioner of Police
Director of the Office of National Drug and Money Laundering Control Policy
Chief Immigration Officer
Comptroller of Customs
Other Ministers appointed by the Prime Minister

=== National Security Advisor ===
Within the terms of Section 101 of the Constitution, a National Security Adviser serves as a public officer and the chief professional adviser to the Prime Minister's department. As directed by the Prime Minister, the National Security Adviser will advise and recommend proposed policies, strategies, and matters pertaining to national security; assist in the formation of national security policies; serve on any other committees, boards, or authorities that deal with national security; represent the Government at national, regional, and international meetings whose topics affect Antigua and Barbuda's national security; advise on and support national law enforcement agencies with regard to the national security aspects of their strategic and operational plans; be in charge of gathering and compiling intelligence and information on matters of national security; be in charge of gathering and presenting operational information; advise the Council on the efficacy of law enforcement agencies in countering threats to national security and on their implementation of Council policies pertaining to national security.

== See also ==
- National security of Antigua and Barbuda
- Government of Antigua and Barbuda
- Antigua and Barbuda Defence Force
