= Joint Intelligence Group =

Intelligence community of Antigua and Barbuda

The Joint Intelligence Group (JIG) is the national intelligence community of Antigua and Barbuda. It was established by a memorandum of understanding to streamline the sharing of intelligence through various agencies responsible for the national security of Antigua and Barbuda. Member organisations include various intelligence agencies, law enforcement agencies, and other national security stakeholders.

== Interagency cooperation ==
The primary intelligence agency of Antigua and Barbuda is the Intelligence Centre, part of the Service and Support Unit of the Antigua and Barbuda Defence Force. In 2016, the force made eleven intelligence requests, and the Coast Guard has participated in various anti-drug operations. The Financial Intelligence Unit of the ONDCP is responsible for gathering intelligence on white-collar organised crime and disseminating it through the JIG. In 2016, the ONDCP made thirty-six intelligence requests through the group, the most of any agency. In its history, the group has participated in the seizure of illicit drugs, money, and illegal firearms.

== List of members ==
In July 2018, the group was composed of five members:

Seal	Organisation	Ministry
	Antigua and Barbuda Defence Force	Finance, Corporate Governance and Public Private Partnerships
	Royal Police Force of Antigua and Barbuda	Legal Affairs, Public Safety, Immigration and Labour
	Office of National Drug and Money Laundering Control Policy	Finance, Corporate Governance and Public Private Partnerships
	Immigration Department	Legal Affairs, Public Safety, Immigration and Labour
	Customs and Excise Division	Finance, Corporate Governance and Public Private Partnerships

== See also ==
- List of intelligence agencies
- National security of Antigua and Barbuda
- Regional Security System
