= Telbert Benjamin =

Antigua and Barbuda Defence Force General

Brigadier general Telbert Benjamin
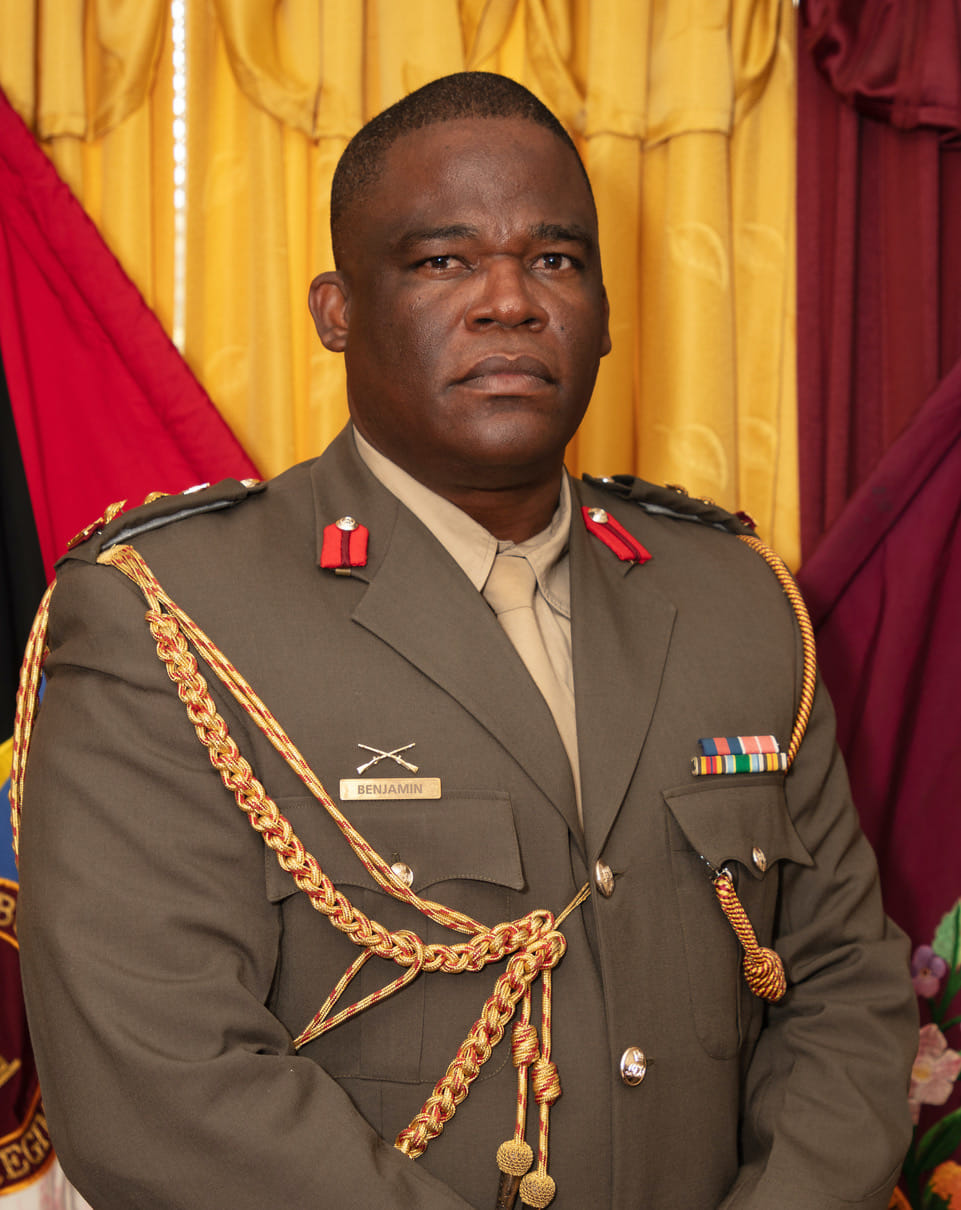
- Official portrait
- Born: December 18, 1974 (age 51); Liberta, Saint Paul
- Children: 2
- Military career
- Branch: Regiment
- Rank: Brigadier general
- Unit: ABDF FHQ
- Commands: Chief of Defence Staff; Commanding Officer of the Antigua and Barbuda Regiment

Telbert Benjamin (born 18 December 1974) is a brigadier general in the Antigua and Barbuda Defence Force, serving as the second Chief of Defence Staff since 21 March 2020. He has served with the Defence Force since 1995 and commanded the 1st Battalion of the Antigua and Barbuda Regiment from 2019 to 2020. As Chief of Defence Staff he helped to implement restrictions during the COVID-19 pandemic in Antigua and Barbuda and has implemented schemes to improve food security in the nation. He was recognised for his service by his appointment as companion of the Order of St Michael and St George in the 2024 Birthday Honours.

== Personal life ==
Benjamin was born in Liberta in 1974. He has studied at the Antigua State College, the University of the West Indies and Webster University. Benjamin is widowed and has two children.

== Military career ==
Benjamin joined the Antigua and Barbuda Defence Force in 1995 and became a platoon commander in 1997. He served as a tactical advisor to the Antigua and Barbuda police for the 2007 Cricket World Cup, the same year he was appointed to command a company. He became a staff officer in 2009, with responsibility for operations and training, and was liaison to the Conference of the Armies of the Americas from 2010 to 2017 and to the Conference of Defence Ministers of the Americas from 2013 to 2017. Benjamin was commanding officer of the 1st Battalion of the Antigua and Barbuda Regiment from 2019 to 2020.

On 20 March 2020 Benjamin was appointed to command the Antigua and Barbuda Defence Force as Chief of Defence Staff. One of his earliest actions in the role was to mobilise the force to work alongside police to enact curfew and social distancing restrictions as a result of the COVID-19 pandemic in Antigua and Barbuda. He was promoted to the rank of brigadier general on 26 August 2024 by Rodney Williams.

Benjamin's tenure as Chief of Defence Staff has seen increased government investment in modernisation and expansion of the force's scope. This has included aquaponics initiatives to raise crops and fish and an expansion of existing schemes to bree pigs and goats to improve food security on the islands. Benjamin was appointed a companion of the Order of St Michael and St George in the 2024 Birthday Honours. In February 2026 he attended the first ever Western Hemisphere Chiefs of Defense Conference, organised following military action in the region by the United States.
