= Military history of Antigua and Barbuda =

The military history of Antigua and Barbuda spans from the initial colonisation of the islands in the seventeenth century to the modern Antigua and Barbuda Defence Force (ABDF). Antigua and Barbuda has been involved in several military conflicts, including battles and raids on its soil.

While defence was the responsibility of the British Armed Forces for most of Antiguan and Barbudan history, the islands eventually received their own volunteer defence force that became the islands' modern military in 1981.

== Colonisation ==
The first recorded military engagements on the islands involved Africans, Europeans, and the Kalinago. In 1640, Falmouth was subject to a large Kalinago raid that resulted in the death of several member's of the governor's family. The town's Government House was especially vulnerable to these attacks. In 1654 another Kalinago raid on Falmouth took place, which was an easy victory for the settlers.

In 1666, Antigua was attacked by the French. This was the only time in Antiguan history that the island was occupied by a non-British power. The attack began on 2 November, based around a fleet from Guadeloupe. By 4 November, the entire island was under French control. The French relinquished their occupation in 1667. In 1668, the small colony on Barbuda was attacked by Kalinago from Dominica and Saint Vincent, resulting in the deaths of about half the colony's population, including the governor. In the 1670s and 1680s, the British Leeward Islands focused much of its efforts on containing the Kalinago and French threats.

In 1704, naval activity began in English Harbour with the construction of Fort Berkeley. In March 1710, Codrington was raided by the French, who pillaged the village and destroyed several buildings. The island was largely defenseless, and most of the population was forced to hide in the largest building in the colony, Codrington Castle.

Nelson's Dockyard, the centre of the British Navy in the region, commenced construction in the 1740s after several decades of pro-military policies by the colonial legislature. In the 1750s, the colonial government also worked on the fortification of St. John's. In the 1780s, Shirley Heights was constructed in English Harbour. Nelson's Dockyard was active during the Napoleonic Wars. In 1793, the Antiguan militia included black people for the first time, however in artillery roles only.

== Late colonial era ==
In 1897, the Antigua Defense Act established the Antigua Volunteer Defense Force (AVDF), which was established with the primary aim of defending sugar plantations against arson. On 14 August 1914, the force was put on active duty. Many people from both Antigua and Barbuda served in World War I. The Antigua Defense Act divided Antigua into several military districts: the first district (St. John's area), second (Piggotts area), the third (the "Parham Military District"), the fourth (the "English Harbour Military District"), the fifth (most of Saint Philip parish), the sixth (most of Saint Mary parish), and the seventh (Potters, Sea View Farm, and Wallings). By the time of this force's dissolution, it had no bases or headquarters.

World War II was an important development in the transition of Antigua's economy away from sugar cultivation. On 27 March 1941, the destroyers-for-bases deal between the United Kingdom and the United States permitted the Americans to build bases in the British West Indies. American base activity was centred around Parham Harbour, which built the Coolidge Air Force Base over the old village of Winthropes and a seaplane base at the Crabbs Peninsula. The influx of wealth from the United States helped lift Antigua's economy out of the Great Depression.

The AVDF was reestablished on 1 June 1956, functioning as the colony's (and later associated state's) military until its incorporation into the ABDF with independence in 1981. During independence negotiations, Vere Bird was skeptical of establishing a military, viewing it as a potential risk factor for a coup d'état.

== Antigua and Barbuda Defence Force ==
The ABDF was established on 1 September 1981, exactly two months before independence. On 29 October 1982, Antigua and Barbuda joined the Regional Security System (RSS) along with the rest of the Organisation of Eastern Caribbean States and Barbados. The RSS was associated with American efforts to stop the spread of communism during the Cold War. Antigua and Barbuda was one of the Caribbean countries that appealed to Ronald Reagan to invade Grenada in 1983. Antiguan and Barbudan participation was limited to a dozen peacekeeping troops away from the frontlines and diplomatic efforts. A few Air Force Office of Special Investigations personnel arrived in Antigua in the weeks leading up to the invasion. Tensions involving the Antigua Caribbean Liberation Movement also contributed to the anti-communist, pro-war rhetoric in the country.

The ABDF was last reformed in 1995. The coast guard was separated from the police force and merged into the defence force, with twenty-one of its twenty-four members becoming part of the military. In 1997, the Service and Support Unit was established. The newest branch is the air wing, established on 12 April 2022.
