= Chief of Defence Staff (Antigua and Barbuda) =

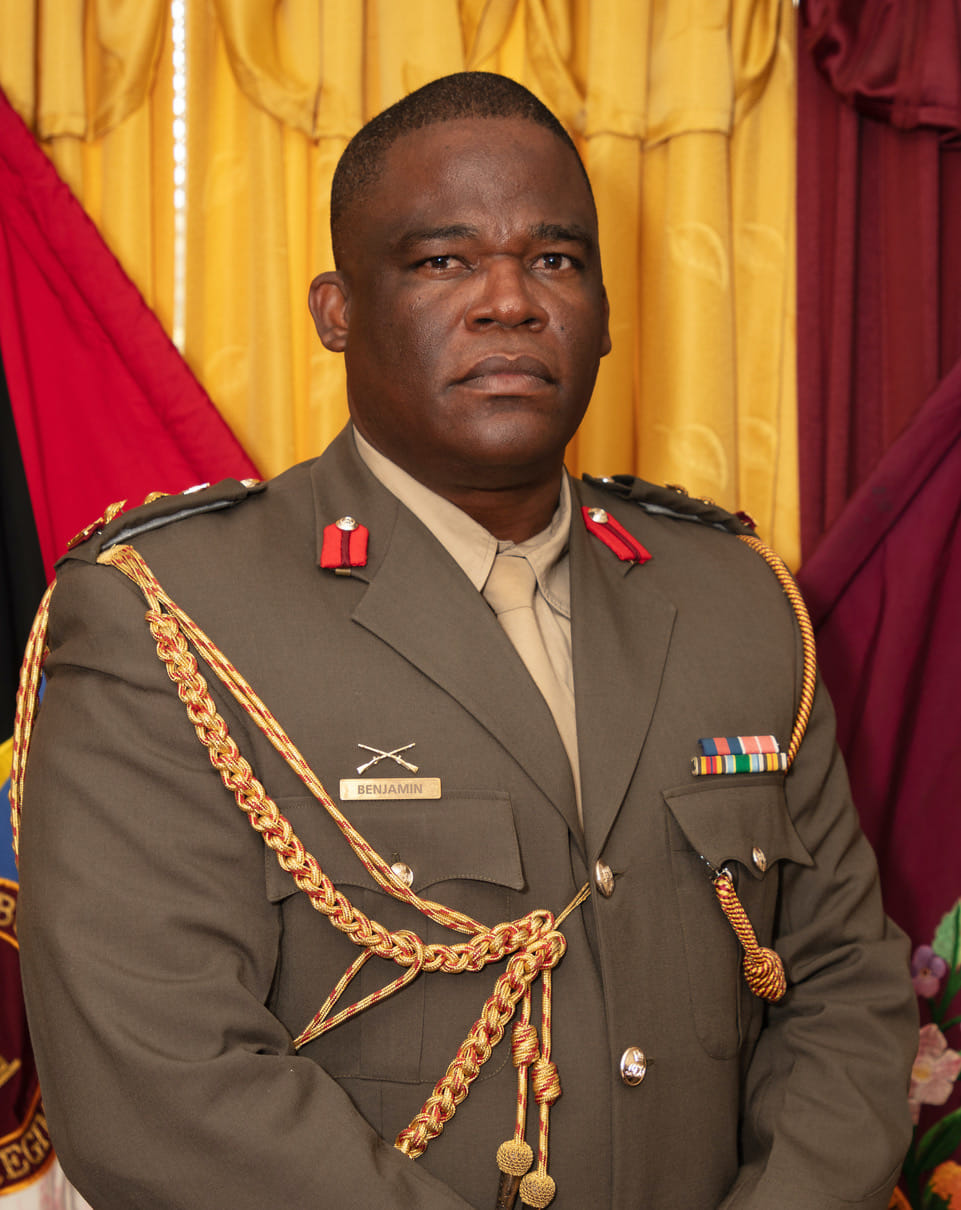
- Incumbent; Telbert Benjamin since 21 March 2020
- Type: Highest-ranking military officer
- Member of: Defence Board; National Security Council
- Reports to: Governor-General

The Chief of Defence Staff is the professional head of the Antigua and Barbuda Defence Force. The Chief of Defence Staff is responsible for the operational use of the force subject to the governor-general, the representative of the commander-in-chief.

== List of officeholders ==
=== Commanding officer ===
No.	Portrait	Name (born–died)	Term of office			Ref.
No.	Portrait	Name (born–died)	Took office	Left office	Time in office	Ref.
1	Leo Gore	Captain; Leo Gore	1958	1964	5–6 years	
2	Dennis Gardiner	Lieutenant colonel Dennis Gardiner	1964	1971	6–7 years	
3	Herman Blackman	Major; Herman Blackman	1971	1979	7–8 years	
4	Llewellyn Haywood	Major; Llewellyn Haywood	1979	1982	2–3 years	
5	Clyde Walker	Lieutenant colonel Clyde Walker	1982	1990	7–8 years	

=== Chief of Defence Staff ===
No.	Portrait	Name (born–died)	Term of office			Ref.
No.	Portrait	Name (born–died)	Took office	Left office	Time in office	Ref.
5	Trevor Thomas	Colonel; Trevor Thomas	1990	2020	29–30 years	
6	Telbert Benjamin	Brigadier general Telbert Benjamin	21 March 2020	Incumbent	6 years, 191 days	
