= USCGC Point Steele =

History

United States
- Name: USCGC Point Steele (WPB-82359)
- Namesake: Point Steele in the Chugach National Forest near Cordova, Alaska
- Owner: United States Coast Guard
- Builder: J.M. Martinac Shipbuilding Corp.
- Laid down: 8 August 1966
- Commissioned: 26 April 1967
- Decommissioned: 9 July 1998
- Fate: Transferred to Antigua-Barbuda, 17 July 1998

General characteristics
- Type: Patrol Boat (WPB)
- Displacement: 60 tons
- Length: 82 ft 10 in (25.25 m)
- Beam: 17 ft 7 in (5.36 m) max
- Draft: 5 ft 11 in (1.80 m)
- Propulsion: 1967 • 2 × 800 hp (597 kW) Cummins diesel engines; 1990 • 2 × 800 hp (597 kW) Caterpillar diesel engines
- Speed: 22.9 knots (42.4 km/h; 26.4 mph)
- Range: 542 nmi (1,004 km) at 18 kn (33 km/h; 21 mph); 1,500 nmi (2,800 km) at 9.4 kn (17.4 km/h; 10.8 mph)
- Complement: Domestic service : 8 men
- Armament: 1967 • 1 × Oerlikon 20 mm cannon

USCGC Point Steele (WPB-82359) was an 82-foot (25 m) Point class cutter constructed at the J.M. Martinac Shipbuilding Corp. yards at Tacoma, Washington, in 1967 for use as a law enforcement and search and rescue patrol boat. The construction was the same as the earlier cutters in the class that were constructed at the Coast Guard Yard. Point Steele was originally named Point Buchon but it is unknown why the name was changed.

== Construction and design details ==
Point Steele was built to accommodate an 8-man crew. She was powered by two 800 hp (597 kW) VT800 Cummins diesel main drive engines and had two five-bladed 42 in (1.1 m) propellers. Water tank capacity was 1,550 U.S. gallons (5,900 L) and fuel tank capacity was 1,840 U.S. gallons (7,000 L) at 95% full. After 1990 she was refit with 800 hp (597 kW) Caterpillar diesel main drive engines. Engine exhaust was ported through the transom rather than through a conventional stack and this permitted a 360-degree view from the bridge; a feature that was very useful in search and rescue work as well as a combat environment.

The design specifications for Point Steele included a steel hull for durability and an aluminum superstructure and longitudinally framed construction was used to save weight. Ease of operation with a small crew size was possible because of the non-manned main drive engine spaces. Controls and alarms located on the bridge allowed one man operation of the cutter thus eliminating a live engineer watch in the engine room. Because of design, four men could operate the cutter; however, the need for resting watchstanders brought the crew size to eight men for normal domestic service. The screws were designed for ease of replacement and could be changed without removing the cutter from the water. A clutch-in idle speed of three knots helped to conserve fuel on lengthy patrols and an eighteen knot maximum speed could get the cutter on scene quickly. Air-conditioned interior spaces were a part of the original design for the Point class cutter. Interior access to the deckhouse was through a watertight door on the starboard side aft of the deckhouse. The deckhouse contained the cabin for the officer-in-charge and the executive petty officer. The deckhouse also included a small arms locker, scuttlebutt, a small desk and head. Access to the lower deck and engine room was down a ladder. At the bottom of the ladder was the galley, mess and recreation deck. A watertight door at the front of the mess bulkhead led to the main crew quarters which was ten feet long and included six bunks that could be stowed, three bunks on each side. Forward of the bunks was the crew's head complete with a compact sink, shower and commode.

== History ==
After commissioning, Point Steele was stationed at Rockaway, New York, where she was used for law enforcement duties and search and rescue work. After late 1969 she was transferred to Oswego, New York, where she was detailed to escort Communist bloc vessels through the St. Lawrence Seaway from Massena, New York, to the Welland Canal. Her first priority, as with all Coast Guard vessels, was search and rescue work. The disabled yacht Cirrus was towed to Sodus Bay, New York, by Point Steele on 25 August 1969. The regular escort of communist vessels continued through 1973; after this date the main thrust of her work on Lake Ontario was law enforcement.

In 1981, Point Steele was stationed briefly at Key West, Florida, before moving her homeport to Fort Myers Beach, Florida, in 1982. 1984 proved to be a busy year for Point Steele with her first major action of the year occurring on 5 January. The FV Skyware was 30 mi (48 km) off Cape Romano, Florida, when she caught fire and Point Steele answered the distress call. On 19 March, the FV El Principe del Golfo was seized by the cutter with 20,000 lb (9,100 kg) of marijuana on board off the coast of Florida. Another boat seizure occurred on 10 November when Point Steele boarded FV Adriana Belle and found 10,000 lb (4,500 kg) of marijuana on board. On 3 December she seized and sank the workboat New Jerusalem 8 mi (13 km) southeast of Miami, Florida after finding hazardous health conditions on the vessel in addition to 49 illegal migrants and 200 lb (91 kg) of marijuana.

In 1985, Point Steele seized FV Crusader with 20,000 lb (9,100 kg) of marijuana on 28 August. After intercepting a sailboat 50 mi (80 km) south of Nassau, Bahamas she turned 100 Haitian migrants over to immigration authorities in September 1985. On 14 October she seized the shrimp boat Black and White with 55,000 lb (25,000 kg) of marijuana 34 mi (55 km) southwest of Sanibel Island.

On 31 March 1987, Point Steele was caught in heavy seas and sustained hull damage requiring a tow of 80 mi (130 km) to St. Petersburg, Florida, by sister cutter Point Swift. On 5 May she seized FV My Girls carrying 50,000 lb (23,000 kg) of marijuana 30 mi (48 km) west of Cape Romano, Florida.

Point Steele was decommissioned 9 July 1998 and transferred to Antigua and Barbuda for use by the Antigua and Barbuda Defence Force on 17 July 1998.
