= USCGC Point Swift =

United States Coast Guard cutter

Coordinates: 38.86028°N 74.67666°W

History

United States
- Name: USCGC Point Swift (WPB-82312)
- Owner: United States Coast Guard
- Builder: Coast Guard Yard, Curtis Bay, Maryland
- Laid down: 3 August 1960
- Launched: 7 September 1960
- Commissioned: 22 March 1961
- Decommissioned: 30 March 1995
- Fate: Stored at Coast Guard Yard, Curtis Bay, Maryland (as of 28 June 1997); Sunk as an artificial reef near Cape May, New Jersey, 30 March 2000

General characteristics
- Type: Patrol Boat (WPB)
- Displacement: 60 tons
- Length: 82 ft 10 in (25.25 m)
- Beam: 17 ft 7 in (5.36 m) max
- Draft: 5 ft 11 in (1.80 m)
- Propulsion: 1961 • 2 × 600 hp (447 kW) Cummins diesel engines; 1990 • 2 × 800 hp (597 kW) Caterpillar diesel engines
- Speed: 16.8 knots (31.1 km/h; 19.3 mph)
- Range: 577 nmi (1,069 km) at 14.5 kn (26.9 km/h; 16.7 mph); 1,271 nmi (2,354 km) at 10.7 kn (19.8 km/h; 12.3 mph)
- Complement: Domestic service : 8 men
- Armament: 1961 • 1 × Oerlikon 20 mm cannon

USCGC Point Swift (WPB-82312) was an 82-foot (25 m) Point-class cutter constructed at the Coast Guard Yard at Curtis Bay, Baltimore in 1961 for use as a law enforcement and search and rescue patrol boat. Since the Coast Guard policy in 1961 was not to name cutters under 100 feet (30 m) in length, it was designated as WPB-82312 when commissioned and acquired the name Point Swift in January 1964 when the Coast Guard started naming all cutters longer than 65 feet (20 m).

== Design and construction details ==
Point Swift was built to accommodate an 8-man crew. She was powered by two 600 hp (447 kW) VT600 Cummins diesel main drive engines and had two five-bladed 42 in (1.1 m) propellers. The main drive engines were later replaced by 800 hp (597 kW) VT800 Cummins engines. Water tank capacity was 1,550 U.S. gallons (5,900 L) and fuel tank capacity was 1,840 U.S. gallons (7,000 L) at 95% full. After 1990 she was refit with 800 hp (597 kW) Caterpillar diesel main drive engines. Engine exhaust was ported through the transom rather than through a conventional stack and this permitted a 360-degree view from the bridge; a feature that was very useful in search and rescue work as well as a combat environment.

The design specifications for Point Swift included a steel hull for durability and an aluminum superstructure and longitudinally framed construction was used to save weight. Ease of operation with a small crew size was possible because of the non-manned main drive engine spaces. Controls and alarms located on the bridge allowed one man operation of the cutter thus eliminating a live engineer watch in the engine room. Because of design, four men could operate the cutter; however, the need for resting watchstanders brought the crew size to eight men for normal domestic service. The screws were designed for ease of replacement and could be changed without removing the cutter from the water. A clutch-in idle speed of three knots helped to conserve fuel on lengthy patrols and an eighteen knot maximum speed could get the cutter on scene quickly. Air-conditioned interior spaces were a part of the original design for the Point class cutter. Interior access to the deckhouse was through a watertight door on the starboard side aft of the deckhouse. The deckhouse contained the cabin for the officer-in-charge and the executive petty officer. The deckhouse also included a small arms locker, scuttlebutt, a small desk and head. Access to the lower deck and engine room was down a ladder. At the bottom of the ladder was the galley, mess and recreation deck. A watertight door at the front of the mess bulkhead led to the main crew quarters which was ten feet long and included six bunks that could be stowed, three bunks on each side. Forward of the bunks was the crew's head complete with a compact sink, shower and commode.

== History ==
After delivery in 1961, Point Swift was assigned a homeport of St. Petersburg, Florida, where she served as a law enforcement and search and rescue patrol boat. On 22 June 1965 she provided firefighting assistance to the burning Irish MV Irish Poplar. On 11 September 1965 she assisted in the tow of disabled FV Carousel west of Tampa, Florida. Point Swift escorted the distressed FV Mistress to Clearwater, Florida on 19 November 1967. On 7 January 1968 she escorted the distressed Liberian MV Pochteca to Tampa Bay. On 21 September 1968, she rescued three from the pleasure craft Blue Star 30 miles south of Anclote Key, Florida. On 12 November she rescued two and salvaged equipment from MV Mystery II 40 miles west of St. Petersburg.

From 1969 to 1994 she was homeported at Clearwater Beach, Florida. On 4 February 1970, she stood by anchored barges that had been released by a tug due to steering problems. On 31 May 1987, Point Swift towed one of her sister ships, the disabled cutter Point Steele 80 mi (130 km) west of St. Petersburg to that port.

On March 30, 1995 Point Swift was decommissioned and stored at the Coast Guard Yard at Curtis Bay, Maryland. She was ultimately sunk as an artificial reef off Cape May, New Jersey 30 March 2000.
