= Camp Blizzard =

Antigua and Barbuda Defence Force headquarters

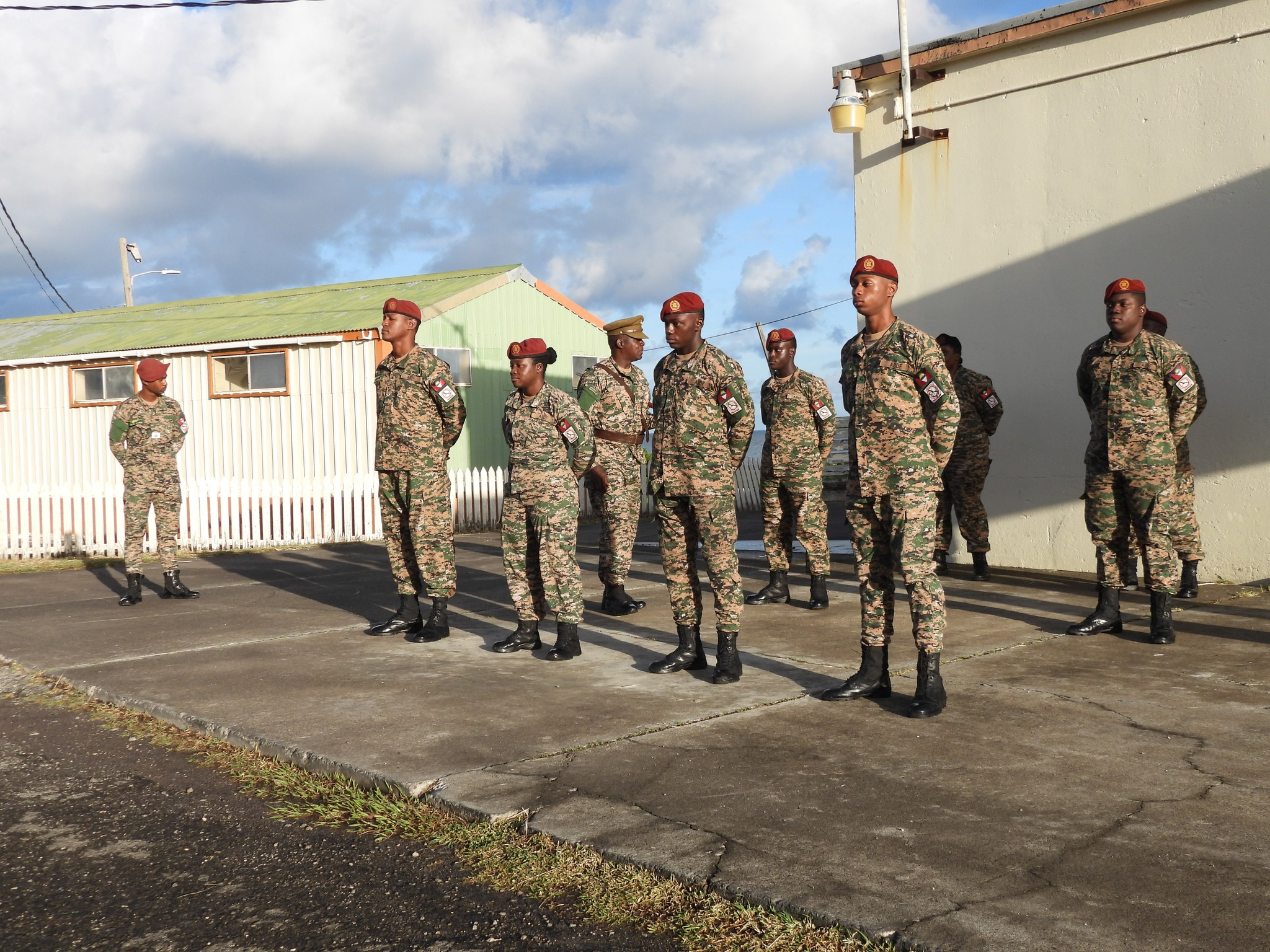
Air Wing troops being inspected at Camp Blizzard in January 2025

Camp Blizzard is the headquarters of the Antigua and Barbuda Defence Force. The camp is located in the village of Osbourn, Saint George Parish; located nearby to Shoal Point, the American University of Antigua, and the V. C. Bird International Airport. Camp Blizzard was formerly a U.S. naval base until 1995.

Camp Blizzard has an immigration detention centre and a reverse osmosis plant. The base houses the 1st Regiment, the Service and Support Unit, Cadet Corps, and the Air Wing. Other facilities include the Force Medic Station and the Construction and Engineering Department.

== See also ==
- Antigua and Barbuda Regiment
