= Environmental issues in Antigua and Barbuda =

Like other island nations, Antigua and Barbuda faces unique environmental issues created by its proximity to the ocean, and small size. These include pressures on drinking water resources, natural ecosystems, and deforestation more generally.

Existing issues on the island are further made worse by climate change, where, not unlike other island nations affected by climate change, sea level rise and increased weather variability, create increased pressures on the communities on the islands and the land, through processes like coastal erosion and saltwater intrusion.

Not only do these issues threaten the residents of the island, but also interfere with the economy – where tourism is 80% of the GDP. The 2017 hurricane season was particularly destructive, with Hurricane Maria and Hurricane Irma, repeatedly damaging vulnerable infrastructure on the islands of Antigua and Barbuda.

== Deforestation ==
Antigua and Barbuda has a land area of 44,342 hectares with tree cover of 19,682 (in hectares) as at 2018. The tree cover loss between the years 2001 and 2018 was 678 hectares, according to Rainfalls Mongabay.

According to the United Nations-FAO, "22.7 (per cent) or about 10,000 hectares of Antigua and Barbuda is forested. Antigua and Barbuda's forests contain ??? million metric tons of carbon in living forest biomass. Biodiversity and Protected Areas: Antigua and Barbuda has some 209 known species of amphibians, birds, mammals and reptiles according to figures from the World Conservation Monitoring Centre. Of these, 2.9% are endemic, meaning they exist in no other country, and 3.3% are threatened. Antigua and Barbuda is home to at least 1158 species of vascular plants, of which 1.9% are endemic. 0.0% of Antigua and Barbuda is protected under IUCN categories I-V."

Antigua and Barbuda had a 2018 Forest Landscape Integrity Index mean score of 4.72/10, ranking it 117th globally out of 172 countries.

== Coastal erosion ==
The government is implementing better construction practices, to limit the environmental footprint of coastal accommodations, such as encouraging glamping instead of building hotels on coastal areas.

== See also ==
- Geography of Antigua and Barbuda
