= Timeline of Antiguan and Barbudan history =

This is a timeline of Antiguan and Barbudan history, consisting of various important political and historical events. To read about the background to these events, see the History of Antigua and Barbuda.

== 16th and 17th centuries ==
Year	Date	Event	Source
1520		Don Antonio Serrano attempts to colonise Antigua, expels indigenous people.	
1627		Earl of Carlisle granted Antigua.	
1629		Pierre Belain d'Esnambuc and his crew attempt to colonise Antigua, leave due to lack of water.	
1632		Antigua successfully settled by Sir Thomas Warner, under instructions of the Earl of Carlisle.	
1640		Kalinago pillage British settlements. Members of the Governor's family may have been killed.	
1654		Major Kalinago attack, Kalinago defeated	
1666	4:00 am, 3 November	French attack Antigua, occupy it until the Treaty of Breda	
1668	13 April	Antigua's legislature meets for the first time	
1671		British Leeward Islands established	
1681	24 August	Original five parishes of Antigua are established	
1685	9 January	Codrington family is granted lease of Barbuda	
1689		Christopher Codrington becomes governor	

== 18th century ==
Year	Date	Event	Source
1702		First town markets established St. John's elects its first town wardens	
1706		Daniel Parke arrives in Antigua	
1710	7 December	Parke is killed	
1725	22 January	Division of New North Sound (then part of Saint Peter) becomes the Parish of Saint George	
1736		Kingdom of Antigua plot uncovered	
1772		St. John's and English Harbour are severely damaged by hurricanes	
1776		Sancta Rita, a Spanish ship, is shipwrecked off the coast of Barbuda	
1793		Black Antiguans allowed to serve in the Antiguan militia's artillery	
1794		Antigua joins invasion of Guadeloupe and Martinique	

== 19th century ==
Year	Date	Event	Source
1800		Census conducted. Antigua has a population of 37,000	
1805		French squadron nearly attacks Antigua, decides to attack Nevis instead	
1808	1 March	Slave trade abolished	
1813		Police force established	
1816		British Leeward Islands abolished, Antigua-Barbuda-Montserrat established	
1820		Census is taken. Antigua has 37,031 people, Barbuda has 503 945-man militia is raised	
1832		British Leeward Islands reestablished	
1834	1 August	Emancipation Day	
1834		Liberta established	
1838	1 July	Militia is abolished	
1842		Bermudian Valley and Bridgetown become ghost towns. Bridgetown residents moved to Freetown	
1858		Point uprising due to dispute between Antiguan dockworkers and Barbudan dockworkers	
1860	1 August	Barbuda reverts to British crown, becomes dependency of Antigua	
1871		British Leeward Islands federalise	

== 20th century ==
Year	Date	Event	Source
1904	30 April	Barbuda Ordinance goes into force, establishes system of island wardens and formalises communal land	
1914	14 August	Antigua Defence Force put on active duty	
1946	26 July	First election held in Antigua	
1945		Village councils established	
1950	December	Village council elections held	
1951	20 December	First democratic election held in Antigua	
1958	3 January	Colony of Antigua joins the West Indies Federation, becomes the Territory of Antigua	
1960	1 January	Antigua becomes self-governing	
1962	31 May	West Indies Federation abolished	
1965	29 November	General election held	
1966	28 February	Antigua Constitutional Conference held	
1967	27 February	Associated State of Antigua established	
1969		Barbudan independence movement emerges	
1971	11 February	Progressive Labour Movement takes office	
1976	23 December	Barbuda Local Government Act	
1981	1 November	Antigua gains independence, renamed to Antigua and Barbuda	
1984	17 April	First election held after independence	
1992		Vere Bird involved in bribery scandal	
1994	8 March	Lester Bird becomes second Prime Minister after an election deemed neither free nor fair	
1999	9 March	Another election deemed neither free nor fair is held, Lester Bird remains prime minister	

== 21st century ==
Year	Date	Event	Source
2004	23 March	First democratic general elections since 1989 in Antigua and Barbuda are held, Baldwin Spencer becomes Prime Minister	
2009	12 March	Baldwin Spencer retains office, holding a two-seat majority	
2014	12 June	Gaston Browne becomes Prime Minister	
2017	8 September	Nearly all of Barbuda's infrastructure destroyed, entire population evacuated to Antigua until about late 2018.	
2018	21 March	Early elections held, resulting in a landslide victory for the Labour Party	
2023	18 January	General election held, Labour Party holds one-seat majority	
2024	4 November	Asot Michael assassinated	
