= National security of Antigua and Barbuda =

The national security of Antigua and Barbuda is the collaboration of numerous institutions, including law enforcement, military, paramilitary, governmental, and intelligence agencies that seek to ensure Antigua and Barbuda's national security.

== Defence force legislation ==
=== Defence Act ===
As per the Defence Act, which governs the Defence Force, the Governor-General may declare by proclamation that a unit shall be deemed to be on active service for a specific period, not to exceed three months, beginning on the date the proclamation enters into force, if it appears to him that doing so is necessary in the public interest due to the impending start of active service or the recent existence of active service. The Defence Act has had various subordinate laws including the defence force regulations, creation of units, defence officers regulations, defence pensions, defence decorations regulations, defence force reserve regulations, defence summary jurdistiction regulations, and defence regular force enlistment and service regulations.

=== Uniforms Act ===
According to the legislation, no one who is not a member of the Defense Forces may wear the uniform of any such force, or any garment that closely resembles such a uniform or bears any of its unique markings, without the Governor-General's authorization.

== Police legislation ==
=== Police Act ===
The Antigua, Montserrat, and Virgin Islands Police Force personnel, transfers to Montserrat and Virgin Islands Police Force, continuity of service, guarantee of rank, pay, and conditions of service, retirement, and period of probation on appointment of police officer above are all governed by the Police Act. The Police Act also governs the establishment and objects of the Police Force, employment of the Force to repel external aggression, and liability to service.

== Prevention of terrorism legislation ==
=== Prevention of Terrorism Act, 2001 ===
The definition of "supervisory authority" is the same as that given to it in the Money Laundering Prevention Act, No. 9 of 1996. In the event that the Supervisory Authority has reasonable suspicions that an individual has engaged in terrorist activities, it is authorized to designate that person as a terrorist or terrorist organization. The Supervisory Authority will identify any individual or entity designated as a terrorist or terrorist organization in accordance with this section by publishing a declaration in the Gazette that includes the following information: in the case of an individual, the name, date and place of birth, nationality, address, phone number, passport number, and tax identification number; in the case of an entity, the name of the organization, the date and place of incorporation, address, telephone number, and facsimile number, as well as any affiliated groups.

=== Prevention of Terrorism Act, 2005 ===
The Minister of Foreign Affairs may, by order published in the Gazette, make any provisions that may appear to him or her to be necessary or expedient in order to enable those measures to be effectively applied when the Security Council of the United Nations decides, in accordance with Article 41 of the Charter of the United Nations, on the measures to be employed to give effect to any of its decisions and requests the Government of Antigua and Barbuda to apply those measures.

== Prisons legislation ==
=== Prisons Act ===
The statute requires the provision and upkeep of prisons, the creation of visiting committees for each jail, the authority of prison guards, and the segregation of convicts.

=== Prisoners of War Act ===
Upon conviction, any individual found guilty of aiding or abetting a prisoner of war who is being held in Antigua and Barbuda to escape from any prison or place of confinement—whether it be inside or outside the country—will face felony charges and a maximum sentence of five years in prison, with or without hard labor. Anyone who knowingly and willfully helps or encourages a prisoner to leave Antigua and Barbuda or attempt to leave the country will be considered to have assisted the prisoner's escape under section 3 of the act and will face the appropriate penalties. However, they are not allowed to help or encourage the prisoner to leave the coast of any part of Antigua and Barbuda. Anyone found guilty of harboring, hiding, secreting, or providing assistance to a prisoner who has escaped from a prison or other place of confinement in Antigua and Barbuda where they were held as prisoners of war faces a misdemeanor conviction and a maximum fine of fifteen thousand dollars, as well as a maximum sentence of three years in prison with or without hard labor. In the event that a prisoner of war confined in Antigua and Barbuda escapes from any prison or other place of confinement, it will be legal for any person or people authorized for that purpose to board any ship, hulk, lighter, or boat in Antigua and Barbuda and search for any such escaped prisoner. If the master or any other person in charge of any such ship, hulk, lighter, or boat, or any other person, hinders or obstructs the person or persons authorized as above during any such search, that person will be arrested, brought before a magistrate, and will be subject to a fine not to exceed fifteen hundred dollars, and upon conviction on an indictment, up to a fine of $5,000 or up to a year and a half in jail, either with or without hard labor.

=== Prison (Extramural Sentences) Act ===
Regardless of any legislation to the contrary, any of the following individuals—that is, anyone sentenced by the court to a maximum of six months in prison; any woman found guilty of a crime that the court deems not to be a serious crime; and anyone facing prison time for failing to pay a fine or a sum of money ordered to be paid in relation to any maintenance, affiliation, or civil proceedings—may, upon the recommendation of the court, at the discretion of the Extramural Prison Officer, and with their consent, work outside of prison under the supervision and control of a public authority (local governments, works departments), in lieu of being imprisoned, subject to the conditions specified.

== National security regulatory agencies ==
=== Defense Board ===
The command, discipline, administration, and all other affairs pertaining to the Antigua and Barbuda Defence Force are under the control of the Antigua and Barbuda Defence Board. The Defense Board may assign additional responsibilities to the Antigua and Barbuda Defence Force. By order of the Defense Board, the Antigua and Barbuda Defence Force may be organized into units or other military entities. Any officer or soldier in the regular Force, or any officer or soldier in the Reserve with his assent, may be required by the Defence Board to go to a location outside of Antigua and Barbuda in order to receive instruction or training, assume duty, or work. With the officer or soldier's permission, the Defense Board may give him to the military authorities of any nation or territory so that he might join that nation's or territory's armed forces. The operational use of the Force is under the control of the Chief of Defence Staff of the Antigua and Barbuda Defence Force. Regulations issued by the Governor-General govern this duty. The Prime Minister can, nevertheless, give instructions to the Chief of Defence Staff about the operational employment of the Antigua and Barbuda Defence Force within the nation in situations when the Governor-General has not issued directives. The Prime Minister has been given this power in order to maintain public safety and order as they see fit. The members of the Defence Board are: (a) the Prime Minister, who shall serve as chairman, ex officio; (b) the Minister responsible for Defence and National Security; (c) any other Minister that the Prime Minister designates; (d) the Chief of Defence Staff, ex officio; and (e) the Permanent Secretary, in the Ministry responsible for Defence, or such other public officer that the Prime Minister designates. Any member of the Defence Board may be nominated by the chairman to preside at any meeting of the Defence Board at which the chairman is not present. The nomination may be general or specific to a particular event.

The Permanent Secretary or any person that the chairman designates to carry out the duties of Secretary at any Defence Board meeting in the case of the Permanent Secretary's absence or incapacity to do so, shall be the Secretary of the Defence Board. The Defence Board may; (a) regulate its operations, how it will carry out its duties, and the responsibilities of its members; (b) delegate any powers or responsibilities of the Board to any member of the Board by notice published in the Official Gazette; (c) consult with any non-members it deems appropriate, including officers commanding units of the Force, on matters pertaining to their units, and the officers shall attend such consultations.

=== National Security Council ===
The National Security Council of Antigua and Barbuda was established in 2006 by The National Security Council Act of 2006. The council serves as the government's main forum for debating issues pertaining to national security, coordinating the policies and actions of the government's departments and agencies in this area, and carrying out any duties assigned to it by legislation. Establishing priorities among activities that address national security interests and requirements, ensuring the collection and collation of information and intelligence relating to Antigua and Barbuda's national security and the integration of that information and intelligence into the government's domestic, foreign, and security policies, and approving policies for departments and agencies of government to follow in relation to national security are all part of the Council's duties. The Council may also recommend to the Minister related to these policies.

The Prime Minister is required to present copies of each annual report produced by the Council to each House of Parliament, subject to section 7(2) of the 2006 act, and to state whether any information has been omitted from those copies in accordance with section 7(2). The Prime Minister may omit any item from the copy of the report presented to each House of Parliament if, following consultation with the Council and the Leader of the Opposition, it appears that the publication of that item in a report would be detrimental to the government's law enforcement agencies' ability to continue carrying out their duties.

Within the terms of Section 101 of the Constitution, a National Security Adviser serves as a public officer and the chief professional adviser to the Prime Minister's department. As directed by the Prime Minister, the National Security Adviser will advise and recommend proposed policies, strategies, and matters pertaining to national security; assist in the formation of national security policies; serve on any other committees, boards, or authorities that deal with national security; represent the Government at national, regional, and international meetings whose topics affect Antigua and Barbuda's national security; advise on and support national law enforcement agencies with regard to the national security aspects of their strategic and operational plans; be in charge of gathering and compiling intelligence and information on matters of national security; be in charge of gathering and presenting operational information; advise the Council on the efficacy of law enforcement agencies in countering threats to national security and on their implementation of Council policies pertaining to national security.

== Intelligence agencies ==
The National Security Adviser and the National Security Council is responsible for the management and gathering of intelligence resources, as per the National Security Council Act of 2006.

=== Financial Intelligence Unit ===
As required by Section 11(i) of the Money Laundering (Prevention) Act 1996, the Financial Intelligence Unit of the ONDCP collects, evaluates, and disseminates financial intelligence provided by Financial Institutions via Suspicious Activity Reports (SAR's). The division is still Antigua and Barbuda's main national financial intelligence organization. Its primary duty is to collect, analyze, and disseminate financial information to the appropriate authorities, especially when it relates to money laundering, fraud, embezzlement, and the proceeds of crime.

=== Criminal Investigations Department ===
The Royal Police Force of Antigua and Barbuda's Criminal Investigation Department is the primary investigation division, having its headquarters in St. John's. The Criminal Investigation Department is responsible to maintaining law and order, protecting life and property, and identifying and looking into reports of severe crimes in line with the goals of the Royal Police Force of Antigua and Barbuda.
