= Major (rank) =

Military rank

Major is a senior military officer rank used in many countries. When used unhyphenated and in conjunction with no other indicators, in most countries major is one rank above captain in armies and air forces, and one rank below lieutenant colonel and is considered the most junior of the senior officer ranks.

== Background ==
The use of Major as part of an official title in Medieval Latin has given the Spanish mayor, French maire, and English "mayor". In English the unadapted form "major" is the title of a military officer now ranking between a captain and a lieutenant colonel. Originally the word was used adjectivally in the title "sergeant major", an officer of high rank (third in command of an army) who performed the same duties of administration, drill and encampments on the staff of the chief commander as the sergeant in a company performs as assistant to the captain. This was in the latter half of the 16th century, and very soon afterwards the "sergeant major" became known as the "sergeant major general"—hence the modern title of major general.

By the time of the English Civil War "majors" had been introduced in each regiment of foot, who corresponded in a lesser sphere to the "major general" of the whole army.

In the 20th century, the word appears also in the British service in "brigade major" (the adjutant or staff officer of a brigade). "Town majors" (garrison staff officers) are now no longer appointed. In the French service up to 1871 the "major general" was the chief of the general staff of a field army, and thus preserved the tradition of the former "sergeant major" or "sergeant major general".

The term major can also be used to denote the leader of a military band such as in pipe major or drum major.

France is an exception, where major is the highest rank of the non-commissioned officers, above adjudant-chef and below aspirant. The equivalent of a major in most other countries (NATO rank OF-3) is a commandant, chef de bataillon or chef d'escadron.

== Links to major ranks by country ==
Alphabetically sorted by name of country:

- Major (Canada)
- Major (France) (a different rank) and Commandant (France), the equivalent of a major in France
- Major (Germany)
- Major (Sweden)
- Major (United Kingdom)
- Major (United States)

== Insignia ==
=== Army insignia ===
Major
(Albanian Land Force)

Mayor
(Angolan Army)

Major
(Antigua and Barbuda Regiment)

Mayor
(Argentine Army)

մայոր
Mayor
(Armenian Ground Forces)

Major
(Australian Army)

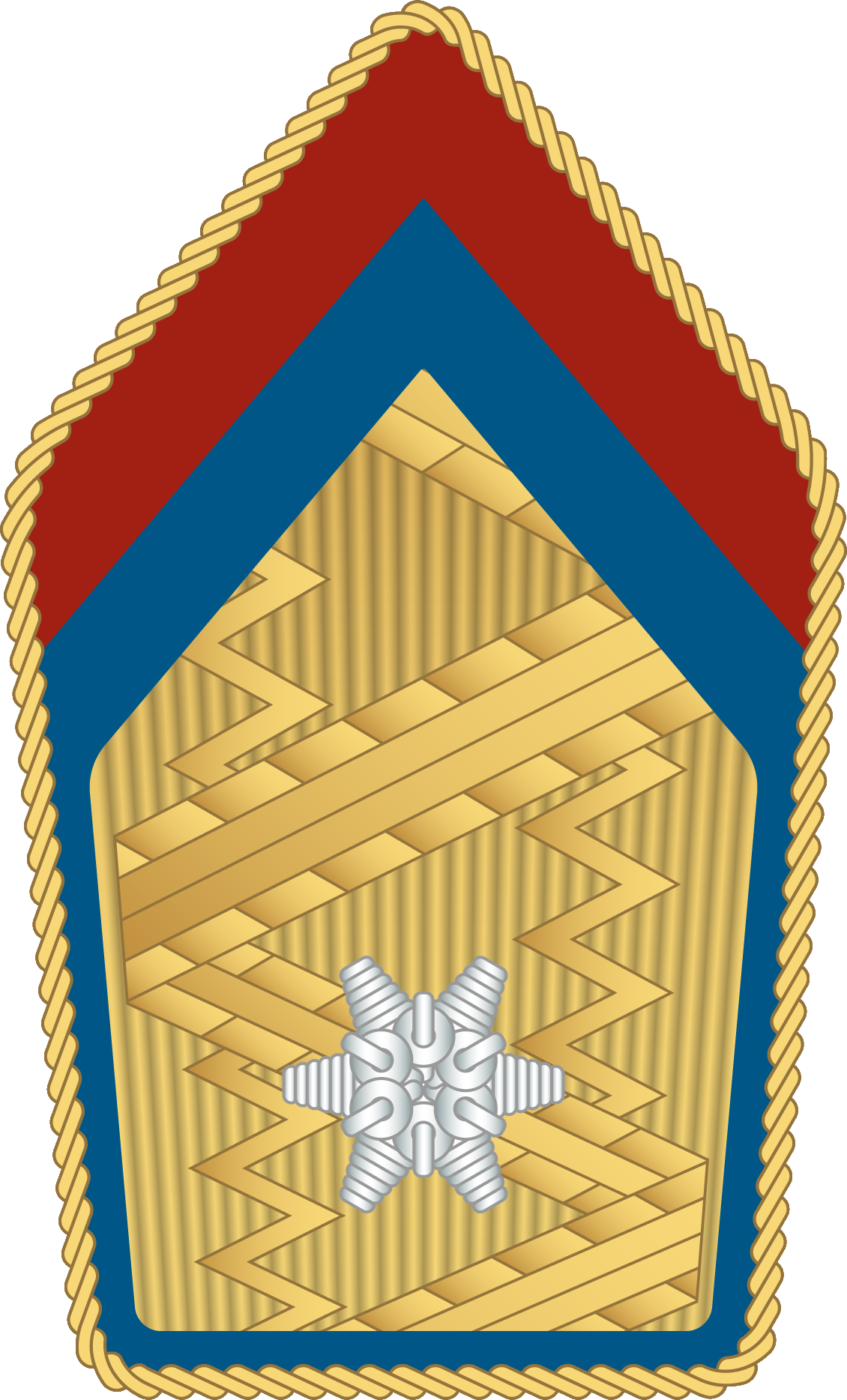
Major
(Austrian Land Forces)

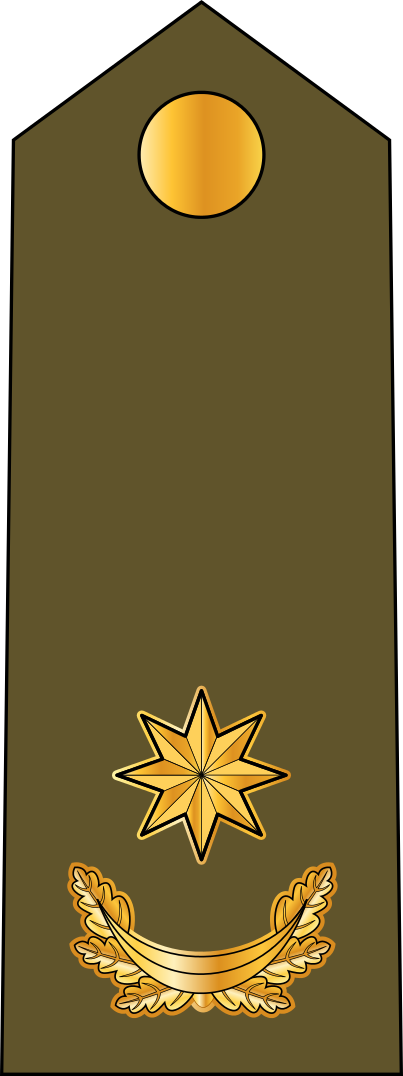
Mayor
(Azerbaijani Land Forces)

মেজর
Mējara
(Bangladesh Army)

Major
(Barbados Regiment)

Маёр
Major
(Belarusian Ground Forces)

Majoor(NL) / Major (FR)
(Belgian Land Component)

Major
(Belize Defence Force)

Mayor
(Bolivian Army)

Major
(Bosnian Ground Forces)

Major
(Botswana Ground Force)

Major
(Brazilian Army)

Mejar
(Royal Brunei Land Force)

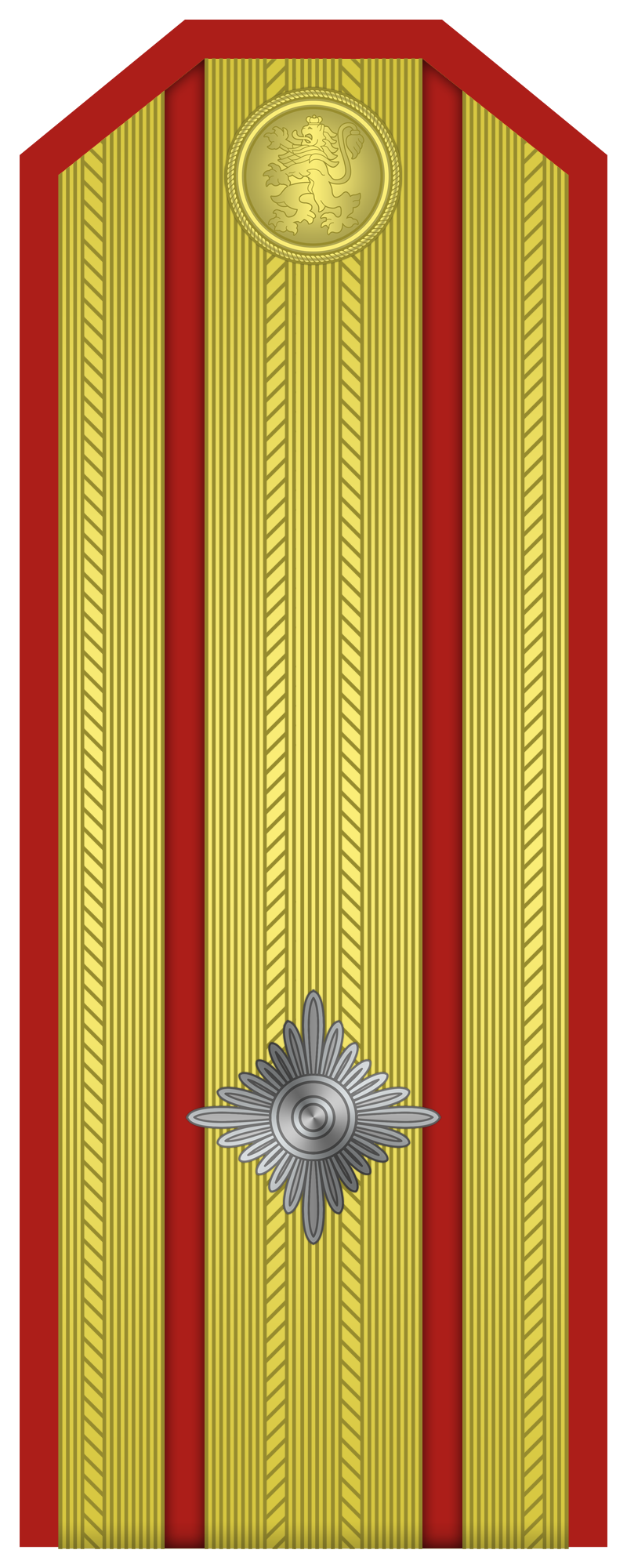
Майор
Mayor
(Bulgarian Land Forces)

Major
(Kirundi: Majoro)
(Burundi Army)

Major
(French: Major)
(Canadian Army)

Major
(Cape Verdean National Guard)

Mayor
(Chilean Army)

Mayor
(Colombian National Army)

Major
(Land Forces of the DR Congo)

Mayor
(Cuban Revolutionary Army)

Major
(Czech Land Forces)

Major
(Royal Danish Army)

Mayor
(Dominican Army)

Mayor
(Ecuadorian Army)

Mayor
(Salvadoran Army)

Major
(Estonian Land Forces)

Major
(Fiji Infantry Regiment)

Majuri
(Swedish: Major)
(Finnish Army)

Major
(Gambian National Army)

მაიორი
Maiori
(Georgian Land Forces)

Major
(German Army)

Mayor
(Guatemalan Army)

Major
(Army of Guinea-Bissau)

Major
(Guyana Army)

Mayor
(Honduran Army)

Major
(Indian Army)

Mayor
(Indonesian Army)

Maggiore
(Italian Army)

Major
(Jamaican Army)

Майор
Mayor
(Kazakh Ground Forces)

Major
(Kenya Army)

Major
(Kosovo Security Force)

Майор
Mayor
(Kyrgyz Army)

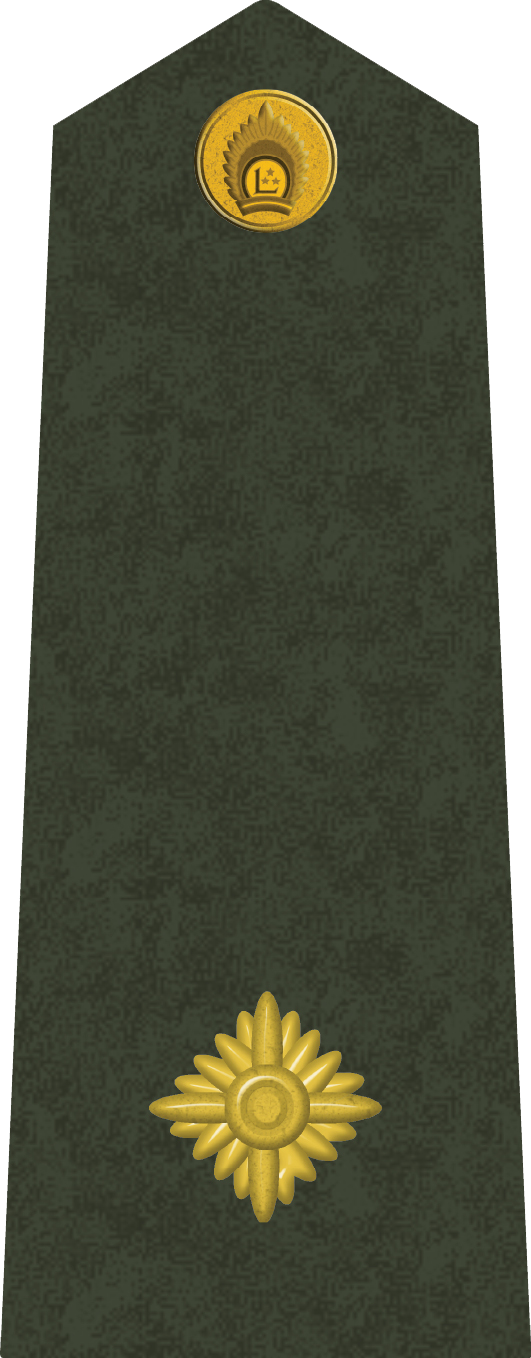
Majors
(Latvian Land Forces)

Major
(Lesotho Army)

Major
(Liberian Ground Forces)

Majoras
(Lithuanian Land Force)

Major
(Luxembourg Army)

Мајор
Major
(North Macedonia Ground Forces)

Mejar
(Malaysian Army)

Major
(Malawi Army)

މޭޖަރ
Meyjar
(Maldivian Marine Corps)

Maġġur
(Army of Malta)

Mayor
(Mexican Army)

Maior
(Moldovan Ground Forces)

Major
(Montenegrin Ground Army)

Major
(Mozambican Army)

Major
(Namibian Army)

Majoor
(Royal Netherlands Army)

Major
(New Zealand Army)

Mayor
(Nicaraguan Army)

Major
(Nigerian Army)

Major
(Norwegian Army)

Major
(Urdu: میجر)
(Pakistan Army)

Major
(Papua New Guinea Land Element)

Mayor
(Paraguayan Army)

Mayor
(Peruvian Army)

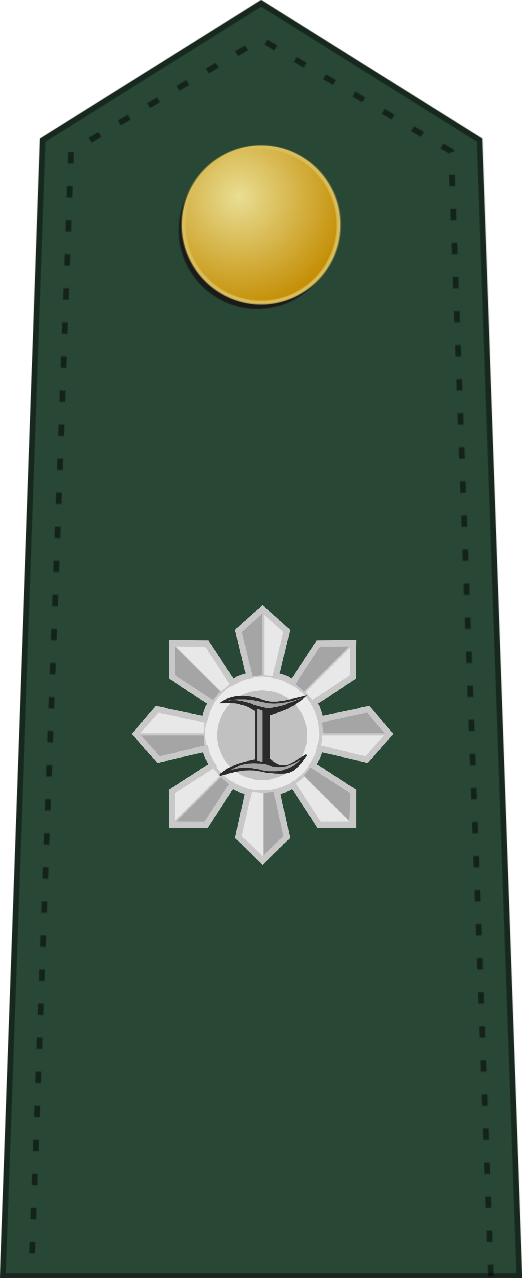
Major
(Philippine Army)

Major
(Polish Land Forces)

Major
(Portuguese Army)

Maior
(Romanian Land Forces)

Майо́р
Majór
(Russian Ground Forces)

Major
(Rwandan Land Forces)

Major
(SKN Regiment)

Major
(Army of São Tomé and Príncipe)

Мајор
Major
(Serbian Army)

Major
(Seychelles Army)

Major
(Slovak Ground Forces)

Major
(Slovenian Ground Force)

Major
(South African Army)

Major
(Sri Lanka Army)

Majoor
(Suriname Army)

Major
(Swedish Army)

Major
(Swiss Army)

Майор
Mayor
(Tajik Ground Forces)

Meja
(Tanzanian Army)

Major
(Timor-Leste Army)

Major
(Tongan Land Component)

Major
(Trinidad and Tobago Regiment)

Maýor
(Turkmen Ground Forces)

Major
(Ugandan Land Forces)

Майор
Maior
(Ukrainian Ground Forces)

Major
(British Army)

Major
(United States Army)

Mayor
(National Army of Uruguay)

Mayor
(Uzbek Ground Forces)

Major
(Swiss Guard)

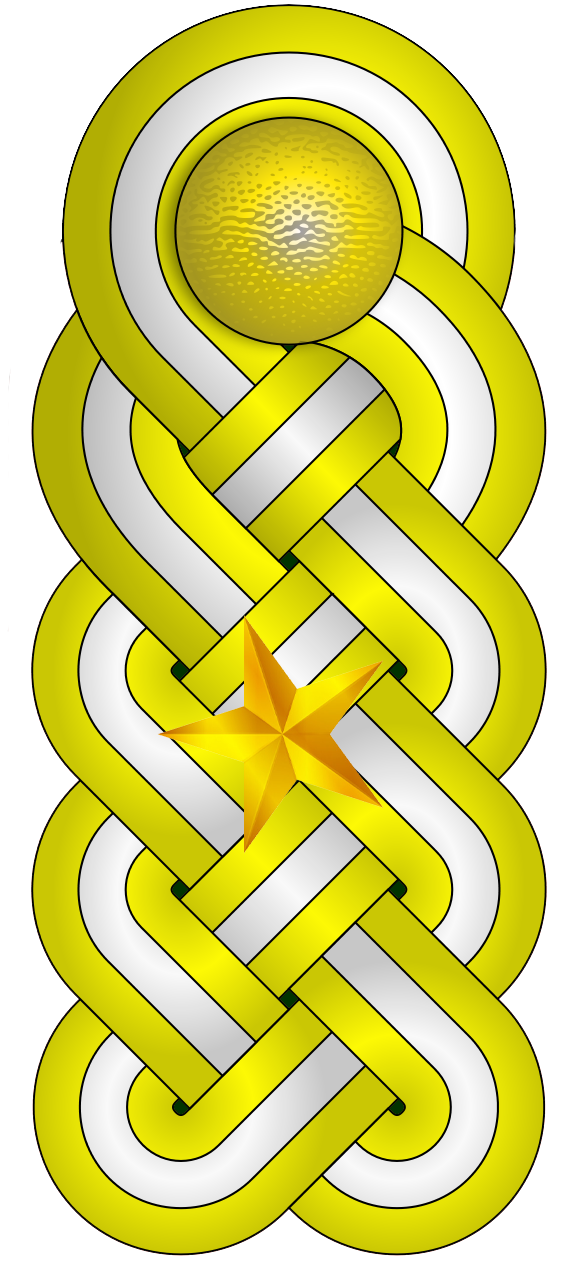
Mayor
(Venezuelan Army)

Major
(Zimbabwe National Army)

== See also ==
- List of comparative military ranks
