= Religion in Antigua and Barbuda =

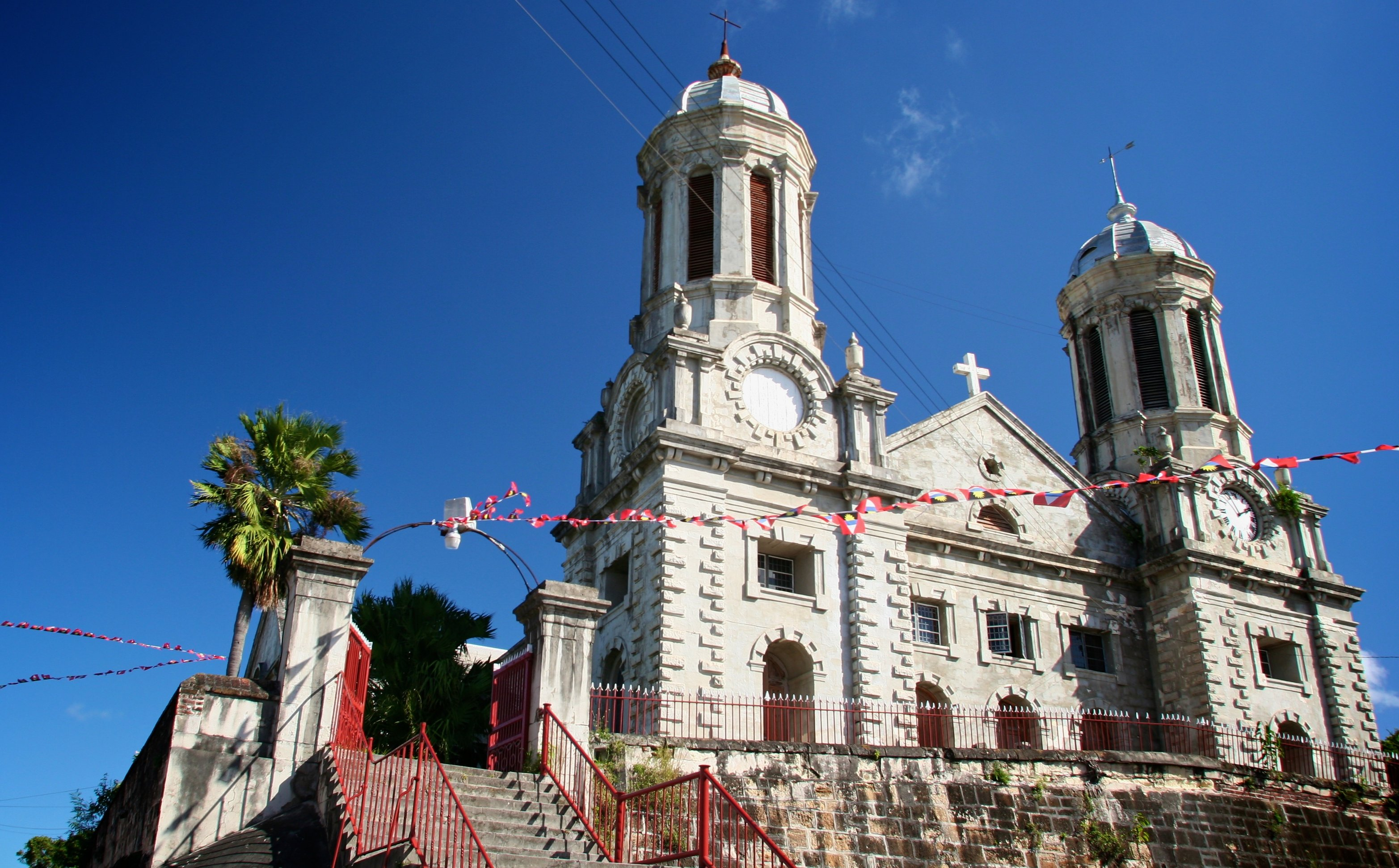
St. John's Anglican Cathedral in the capital St. John's

Christianity is the dominant religion in Antigua and Barbuda, with Anglicanism being its largest denomination.

Antigua and Barbuda is a secular state and its constitution guarantees freedom of religion and conscience. Christmas and Easter are recognised as national holidays.

== Demographics ==
According to the most recent 2011 census, which has the most reliable figures available, 64.3% of the population of Antigua and Barbuda is Christian.

Anglicans make up 17.6% of the population, while Seventh-day Adventists are 12.4%, Pentecostals are 12.2%, 8.3% belong to the Moravian Church, 8.2% are Catholics, 5.6% are Methodist and over 5% are 'other Christian'. Almost 5% have no religious beliefs; the census noted that 12.2% of the population as belonging to other religious groups, including Rastafarians, Muslims, Hindus, and Baha’is.

The Church of Jesus Christ of Latter-day Saints claimed 161 members in 2007.

== Religious freedom ==
The constitution of Antigua and Barbuda establishes the freedom of religious belief in the country. Members of clergy are not allowed to run for political office.

Representatives of the Rastafari community have complained that legal restrictions such as mandatory vaccination policies are contrary to their religious beliefs, although the government is also reportedly working with the community to reach a compromise on these issues.

In 2023, the country was scored 4 out of 4 for religious freedom.

== See also ==
- Hinduism in Antigua and Barbuda
- Islam in Antigua and Barbuda
