= Service and Support Unit =

Service branch of the Antigua and Barbuda Defence Force

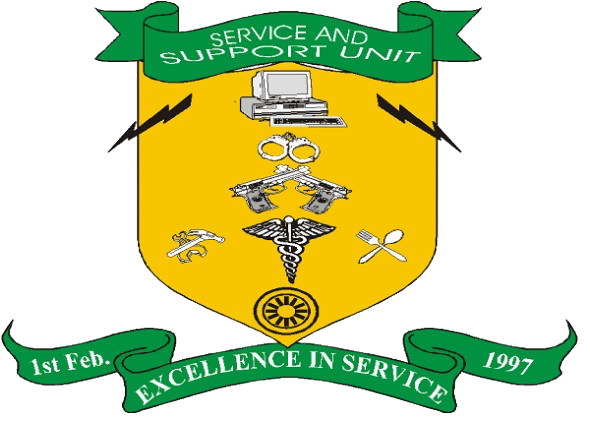
- Active: 1997–present
- Country: Antigua and Barbuda
- Allegiance: Antigua and Barbuda Defence Force
- Size: 71
- Garrison/HQ: Camp Blizzard
- Motto: "Excellence in service"

The Service and Support Unit (SSU) is a branch of the Antigua and Barbuda Defence Force. The unit is responsible for catering services, transportation, military construction, intelligence, and medical support to the rest of the force. The current goal of the unit is to upgrade its sections into platoons.

== Organisation ==
The unit is divided into nine sections.

- Registry Section
- Military Police
- Intelligence Centre - the centre is the primary intelligence agency of the country and is associated with the Joint Intelligence Group, the country's intelligence community. The section also works with the Office of National Drug and Money Laundering Control Policy to combat drug trafficking.
- Training Wing
- Quartermaster
- Administration Section
- Signals Section
- Transportation Section
- Medical Section

== See also ==
- Joint Intelligence Group
- National security of Antigua and Barbuda
