= Antigua and Barbuda Coast Guard =

Antigua and Barbuda Defence Force Coast Guard
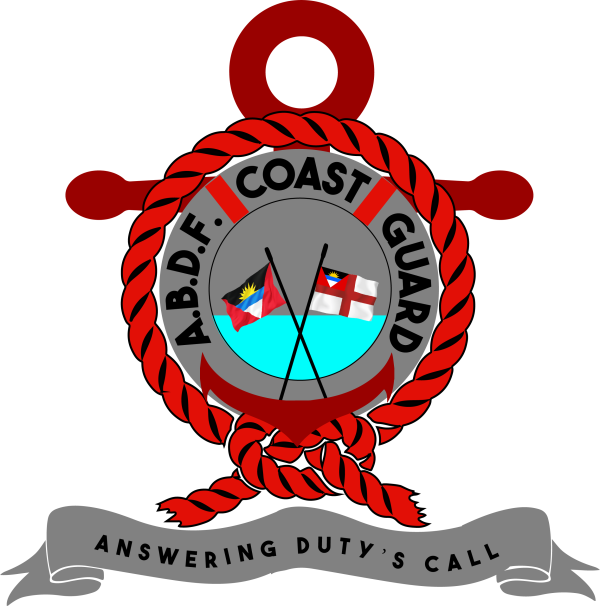
- Logo of the Antigua and Barbuda Coast Guard
- Active: 1995–present
- Country: Antigua and Barbuda
- Allegiance: Antigua and Barbuda Defence Force
- Motto: "Answering duty's call"

Commanders
- Lieutenant commander: Dorian Davis

The Antigua and Barbuda Defence Force Coast Guard is the maritime branch of the Antigua and Barbuda Defence Force. The purpose of the coast guard is to maintain the country's interests, and along with the Antigua and Barbuda Defence Force Air Wing, patrol the waters of the country. The Coast Guard is also responsible for search and rescue missions, oil pollution response, ship safety inspections, and broadcasting of maritime safety alerts.

== History ==
The Coast Guard was originally founded as the Antigua and Barbuda Police Marine Unit, however, on 1 May 1995, it was absorbed into the Antigua and Barbuda Defence Force, and became known as the Antigua and Barbuda Coast Guard.

== Organisation ==
- Commanding Officer's Office
- Engineer Unit
- Administration Unit
- Flotilla – the flotilla is the operational part of the Coast Guard, and consists of the following water-craft:
  - 1 Swiftships Shipbuilders 19.81-metre Commercial Cruiser-class patrol boat (P-01 Liberta), in service since 1984
  - 1 SeaArk Boats Dauntless-class patrol boat (P-02 Palmetto), in service since 1995
  - 1 Point-class cutter (P-03 Hermitage), transferred from the U.S. Coast Guard in 1998
  - 1 Defender 380X-class all-weather interceptor (D-8), date of acquisition unknown
  - 2 Boston Whaler 8.23-metre launches (071 and 072), in service since 1988
  - 1 Zodiac Marine & Pool 8.23-metre Hurricane-type rigid-hulled inflatable boat in service since 1998
