= National Security Council Act of 2006 =

12th Parliament of Antigua and Barbuda
- Long title: AN ACT to establish a National Security Council to advise the Government with respect to national security, to coordinate national security among various government agencies and to enable the law enforcement and security forces and agencies of the Government to cooperate more effectively in matters involving national security.
- Citation: http://laws.gov.ag/wp-content/uploads/2020/02/No.-14-of-2006-The-National-Security-Council-Act-2006.pdf
- Assented to: 13 October 2006
- Commenced: 26 October 2006
- Status: Amended

The National Security Council Act of 2006 is an Act of the Parliament of Antigua and Barbuda.

== Summary ==
The function of the council established under the act is to be the primary government forum for discussing national security-related issues, coordinate the departments' and agencies' national security-related policies and operations, and carry out any duties assigned to it by any law. Other functions of the council include to;

- To evaluate and approve the national security-related regulations that must be followed by government departments and agencies, and to provide recommendations to the Minister in this regard;
- Submit to the Minister reports, suggestions, and such information as the Minister may request;
- Establishing priorities among the activities that address national security interests and requirements, collecting and integrating information and intelligence pertaining to Antigua and Barbuda's national security into the government's domestic, foreign, and security policies, and establishing and overseeing programs.
