= Antigua and Barbuda Defence Force =

Armed forces of Antigua and Barbuda

- Antigua and Barbuda Defence Force emblem

- Flag of the Antigua and Barbuda Defence Force
- Motto: Paratus ad serviendum (Ready to serve)
- Founded: 1 June 1956; 70 years ago
- Current form: 20 December 1995; 30 years ago
- Service branches: Regiment; Coast Guard; Cadet Corps; Service and Support Unit; Air Wing
- Headquarters: Camp Blizzard, Saint George
- Website: Official website

Leadership
- Commander-in-Chief: Charles III, King of Antigua and Barbuda represented by Sir Rodney Williams, Governor General of Antigua and Barbuda
- Prime Minister: Gaston Browne
- Chief of Defence Staff: Telbert Benjamin

Personnel
- Military age: 18
- Active personnel: 240
- Reserve personnel: 75

Expenditure
- Budget: EC$36,820,100
- Percent of GDP: 0.83%

Related articles
- Ranks: Military ranks of Antigua and Barbuda

The Antigua and Barbuda Defence Force (ABDF) is the armed forces of Antigua and Barbuda. The ABDF has responsibility for several different roles: internal security, prevention of drug smuggling, the protection and support of fishing rights, prevention of marine pollution, search and rescue, ceremonial duties, assistance to government programs, provision of relief during natural disasters, assistance in the maintenance of essential services, and support of the police in maintaining law and order. The force entered its current form on 20 December 1995.

The ABDF is one of the world's smallest militaries, consisting of 245 personnel. The first militia in Antigua was established in the 1600s, having fought against the French capture of the island in 1666. The governor oversaw the force, and by 1820 the island had a 945-man militia. The island continued to maintain this force for much of the colonial era, and by 1 September 1981 the Antigua Volunteer Defence Force was renamed to the Antigua and Barbuda Defence Force preceding independence. The force has undergone various reforms, and the present force was reestablished on 1 June 1956.

== Organisation ==
380X Defender of the ABDF Coast Guard during the "Tradewinds 2013" joint training-exercise

The ABDF consists of five branches:

- Antigua and Barbuda Regiment – comprises four line companies and is the infantry unit and fighting arm of the defence force.
- Service and Support Unit – provides administrative, logistic and engineer support to the rest of the defence force.
- Coast Guard – the maritime element of the defence force.
- Air Wing – the aerial element of the defence force.
- Cadet Corps – voluntary youth organisation.

=== Defence Board ===
The Defence Board is in charge of overseeing the leadership, management, and discipline of the Antigua and Barbuda Defence Force as well as all other matters pertaining to it. The Defence Board has the authority to govern its work, how it will carry out its duties, and the responsibilities of its members. It can also assign any member of the Board any authority or duty, by publishing a notice in the Official Gazette; consult with non-members as appropriate, including officers commanding units of the Force, regarding matters pertaining to their units; and the officers are required to attend the meetings as the Board requests; decide on the protocol to be followed in conducting its business; and provide for any other matter that it deems necessary or desirable for achieving the better performance of its functions.

=== Officers ===
A person cannot be appointed to the force unless they have received a recommendation from a board, known as the Commissions Board in the Defence Act. This board is made up of the chairman, who is appointed by the Chief of Defence Staff; the Chairman of the Public Service Commission, or in his absence, the Vice Chairman of the Public Service Commission; and an individual appointed by the Defence Board for a duration determined by the Board. His Majesty has the authority to appoint people to the Antigua and Barbuda Defence Force, and the Governor-General may act in that capacity. A commission may be awarded for a predetermined amount of time or for an unlimited amount of time.

=== Reserve forces ===
There are two classes in the Antigua and Barbuda Defence Force Reserve. The soldiers enlisted, deemed to be enlisted, or re-engaged in accordance with this Part for service in that class; the Reserve soldiers of the second class who have, upon written application to the appropriate military authority, been accepted by that authority for service in the first class; and the soldiers transferred to the first class in accordance with section 31 of the Defence Act comprise the first class. The soldiers who are members of the second class by virtue of Part IV of the Defence Act, the officers who are appointed or transferred to that class, and the soldiers who are enlisted, deemed to be enlisted, or re-engaged in accordance with Part IX of the Defence Act for service in that class are all included in the second class.

Each officer and soldier in the first class of the Reserve is required to report for duty at the location and for the duration determined by the Defence Board. They are also required to meet all training-related requirements. Subject to any general directives from the Defence Board, the requirements of the related section may be disregarded in whole or in part with regard to any unit of the first class of the Reserve, as well as with regard to any individual officer or soldier of the first class of the Reserve, by his commanding officer. Nothing stops a Reserve officer or soldier from participating in optional training in addition to any mandated training.

The first class of the Reserve, or as many officers and soldiers of that class as the Board deems necessary, may be called out on temporary duty by the Defence Board when needed. Under section 203, officers and soldiers who are called out for duty are not required to serve for more than ninety days at a time. Because the worker is a Reserve member who is called out in accordance with the section, no employer may fire or give notice of termination to any worker. When an employer violates, they are guilty of a crime and face a maximum fine of $5,000, a maximum sentence of two (2) years in jail, or both. This applies even in cases of summary conviction.

The Governor-General may, on the advice of the Prime Minister, by proclamation order that the Reserve, or any class thereof, be called out on permanent service in the event of a state of war, insurrection, hostilities, or public emergency; the Defence Board will then take appropriate action. When called out on permanent duty, every Reserve officer and soldier is eligible to stay on permanent duty until told otherwise. Every officer and soldier belonging to such a class, as the case may be, to the part of any class so called out, shall attend in person at the designated location whenever the whole or any part of the first class of the Reserve is called out on temporary or permanent service; or whenever the whole or any part of the second class of the Reserve is called out on permanent service. The Defence Board shall cause every officer or soldier subject to such call-out to be served with a notice requiring him to attend at the time and place specified in the notice in the event that the first class of the Reserve is called out on temporary service or the Reserve is called out on permanent service.

An officer of the Antigua and Barbuda Defence Force may file a summarily complaint against a person who willfully takes away pawns, wrongfully destroys or damages, carelessly loses anything issued to him as an officer or soldier of the Reserve, or willfully refuses or fails to deliver up anything issued to him as an officer or soldier as a debt owed to the Crown. This applies even if the amount exceeds the normal monetary limit on a magistrate's jurisdiction.

A Reserve soldier may be released at any point during the duration of their service in the Reserve by the appropriate military authority under the prescribed conditions.

== Enlistment and terms of service ==
A recruiting officer will not enlist anyone in the Force unless they are satisfied that the potential recruit has received, comprehended, and wishes to be enlisted after receiving a notice in the prescribed form from anyone who wants to join the regular Force. A recruiting officer is not allowed to enlist a minor under the age of eighteen into the regular force unless written consent has been obtained from at least one parent, from any parent who may have parental rights and powers over the minor, from any person whose whereabouts are known or can be determined with reasonable effort, or from any person who is in fact or legally responsible for the minor. For the purposes of the Defence Act, an individual who is willing to enlist will be considered to have reached, or not reached, the age of eighteen if the recruiting officer is satisfied—either through the production of a certified copy of an entry in the register of births, or by any other evidence that seems sufficient to them. The period of time that an individual may enlist in the regular force is as follows: in the case of an individual who is 18 years of age or older at the time of enlistment, a term of colour service that does not exceed 12 years as prescribed; in this case, the term of service in the Reserve will apply to the portion of the term that is prescribed as a term of colour service, and the remaining portion will apply to a term of service. In the case of an individual who is younger at the time of enlistment, the period of time that is prescribed will begin on the date that the individual reaches the age of eighteen years or a term not to exceed 12 years, as specified, starting on the day he reaches that age and consisting of the portion of it that is prescribed as a term of colour service and the remaining portion as a term in the reserve.

Any soldier of good character who has served their full term of colour service or who will be serving in the Reserve in two years may, with permission from the appropriate military authority, re-engage for an additional period of colour service and Reserve duty as prescribed; however, the additional period of colour service, when combined with the original period of colour service, may not exceed a total continuous period of 22 years colour service from the date of the soldier's original attestation or the date he became eighteen years old, whichever comes first. Any soldier who has completed 22 years of colour service may, if he so chooses and with the consent of the appropriate military authority, continue to serve in all capacities as if his colour service term had not yet expired. However, on the date that he notifies his commanding officer that he wishes to be discharged, he may be eligible for discharge at the end of the three-month period. Any soldier whose term of colour service expires during a public emergency, war, insurrection, hostilities, or other exigency of duty may be kept in the Force and have their service extended for an additional period of time as directed by the Defence Board and the appropriate military authority.

Every regular force soldier who is eligible for discharge will be released as soon as possible, subject to the Defence Act. However, until they are released, they are subject to military law as stipulated by the Act. When a regular force soldier is serving outside of Antigua and Barbuda at the time of his discharge, he has two options: if he wants to be discharged in Antigua and Barbuda, he will be sent there at no cost as soon as possible, and he will be released either when he arrives in Antigua and Barbuda or, if he agrees to a delay in discharge, six months after arriving; else, he will be released where he is currently serving. Releasing a soldier from the regular force requires authorization from the appropriate military authority, unless they are being released in accordance with a court-martial sentence. Upon their release from active duty, all regular force soldiers will receive a certificate of discharge that includes the necessary information. Every regular Force soldier who is scheduled to be transferred to the Reserve may do so in accordance with the Act, but they will remain subject to military law until they are transferred. When a regular Force soldier serving outside of Antigua and Barbuda is scheduled to be transferred to the Reserve, he will be sent there at no cost to him and will be transferred to the Reserve upon arrival, or within six months of his arrival if he agrees to a delay in transfer; he may, however, choose to be transferred to the Reserve without having to return to Antigua and Barbuda. When a regular Force soldier is being transferred to the Reserve, the appropriate military authority has the authority to immediately discharge him without providing a reason.

A court-martial sentence, a Defence Board order, or an order from an officer not lower than Major or a corresponding rank who has been given permission by the commanding officer may be the only ways that a warrant officer or non-commissioned officer's rank may be lowered. If a regular force warrant officer is demoted to the ranks, he or she may request to be discharged, barring a state of war, insurrection, hostilities, or public emergency. Anytime during the duration of the soldier's term of engagement, the competent military authority may release a regular force soldier for the prescribed reasons. Regular Force soldiers have the right to request their discharge at any point within three months of the date of their first attestation. If they do so, they will be released as soon as possible after paying a sum not to exceed EC$500. However, they will still be subject to military law until their discharge under the Act. A soldier of the regular Force who was a member of a Commonwealth Force at any point within three months prior to the date of his first attestation is exempt from this.

== Deployments ==
- In 1983, fourteen men of the Antigua and Barbuda Defence Force were deployed to Grenada during the Operation Urgent Fury.
- In 1990, twelve soldiers were sent to Trinidad and Tobago after a failed coup attempt by a radical group against the constitutionally elected government headed by Prime Minister A.N.R. Robinson.
- In 1995, members of the Antigua and Barbuda Defence Force were deployed in Haiti as a part of Operation Uphold Democracy.

== Alliances ==
- United Kingdom – Mercian Regiment

== See also ==
- Military history of Antigua and Barbuda
- Regional Security System
