= Antigua and Barbuda Regiment =

- Insignia
- Founded: 20 December 1995; 30 years ago
- Country: Antigua and Barbuda
- Allegiance: Antigua and Barbuda Defence Force
- Type: Infantry
- Role: Marine infantry
- Size: One battalion
- Part of: Antigua and Barbuda Defence Force
- Garrison/HQ: Camp Blizzard
- Engagements: United States invasion of Grenada

Commanders
- Colonel-in-Chief: Charles III, King of Antigua and Barbuda represented by Sir Rodney Williams, Governor General of Antigua and Barbuda
- Lieutenant colonel: Dalton Graham

Insignia
- Flag

The Antigua and Barbuda Regiment is the infantry unit and main fighting arm of the Antigua and Barbuda Defence Force. Previously known as the Rifle Company, it was formed in 1995. The regiment main weapons include M-16 rifles, M4 carbines Mossberg 500 Ak47 and M60 machine guns.

== Mission ==
The regiment has a number of roles - primarily it is responsible for maintaining the internal security of Antigua and Barbuda, which is linked to providing assistance to the police in maintaining law and order. However, it is also responsible for providing the Antiguan contingent to peacekeeping missions overseas, often in conjunction with other countries in the Eastern Caribbean.

== History ==
In its previous incarnation as the Rifle Company, the regiment participated in the invasion of Grenada alongside the Barbados Regiment and Jamaica Regiment in 1983. In December 2004, Baldwin Spencer, the Prime Minister of Antigua and Barbuda, announced that, as part of the reforms to the ABDF, the 1st Battalion, Antigua and Barbuda Regiment would convert from its current light infantry role into a marine role, enabling it to better support and serve the ABDF Coast Guard in its anti-drug and maritime security missions.

== Organisation ==
The regiment consists of a single light infantry battalion, commanded by a Lieutenant Colonel and made up of four companies:

- Headquarters (HQ) Company
- A Company: Regular infantry
- B Company: Volunteers
- C Company: Combat Support
