= Antigua and Barbuda Defence Force Air Wing =

- Roundel
- Active: 12 April 2022–present
- Country: Antigua and Barbuda
- Allegiance: Antigua and Barbuda Defence Force
- Size: 2 aircraft
- Motto: Sparing nothing, giving all
- March: Fair Antigua, We Salute Thee

Commanders
- Lieutenant colonel: Alando Michael

Aircraft flown
- Transport: BN-2 Islander, Piper PA-31

The Antigua and Barbuda Defence Force Air Wing is the aerial component of the Antigua and Barbuda Defence Force. It is one of the five branches of the force. The purpose of the air wing includes troop transport, medical evacuation, disaster response, search and rescue and assisting other government agencies. The unit was commissioned on 12 April 2022 and started operations with one aircraft (a second-hand BN-2 Islander), a second airframe (Piper PA-31) entered service in 2023. Since then, it has expressed interest in acquiring a helicopter, and additional aircraft. As of March 2025, the aircraft numbered two, and a third aircraft was being planned. Currently they are based in the Calvin Air hangar at V.C. Bird International Airport, but are scheduled relocate to a more suitable hangar.

== Aircraft ==
=== Current inventory ===
Aircraft	Origin	Type	Variant	In service	Notes
Transport
Britten-Norman BN-2 Islander	United Kingdom	Transport		1	Serial ABDF-A1
Piper PA-31 Navajo	United States	Transport	PA-31-350 Chieftain	1	Serial ABDF-A2. Also 1 additional "unserviceable" aircraft
