= List of Antiguans and Barbudans =

This is a list of notable people from Antigua and Barbuda.

== Artists ==
- Heather Doram, artists and designer of the national costume.

== Athletes ==
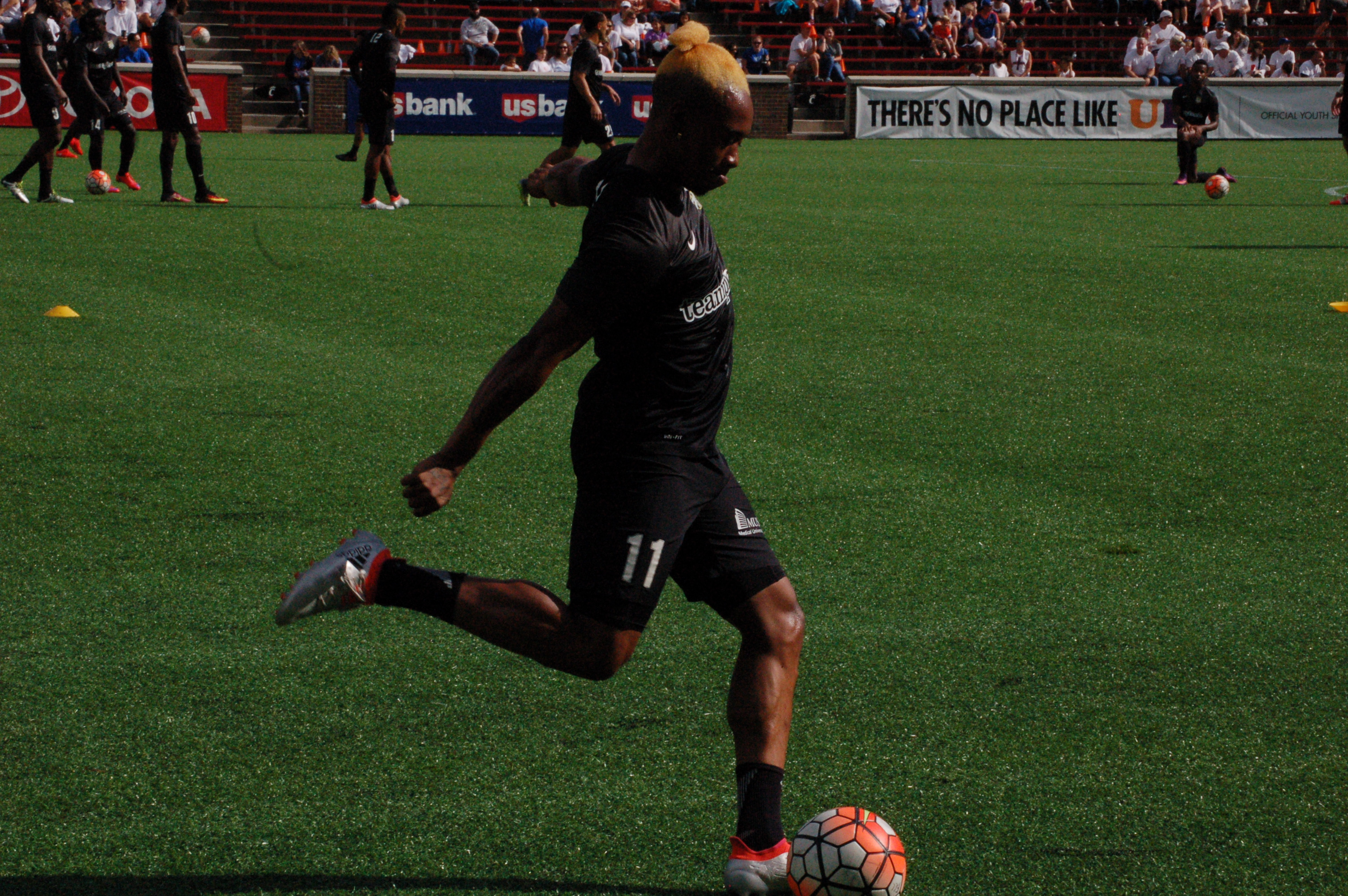
- Quinton Griffith in 2016
  Curtly Ambrose (born 1963), cricketer born in Antigua.
- Steveroy Anthony (born 1971), professional footballer from Antigua and Barbuda.
- Daniel Bailey (born 1986), Olympic sprinter from Antigua and Barbuda.
- Kenny Benjamin (born 1967), cricketer from Antigua and Barbuda.
- Rai Benjamin (born 1997), Olympic athlete raised in Antigua.
- Tamiko Butler (born 1991), cyclist from Antigua and Barbuda.
- Peter Byers (footballer) (born 1984), Antiguan footballer.
- Brendan Christian (born 1983), Olympic sprinter from Antigua and Barbuda.
- Miguel Francis (born 1995), runner raised in Antigua and Barbuda.
- Rowan Gomes (1962 - 2023), Antiguan basketball player.
- Hugh Gore (cricketer) (born 1953), Antiguan cricketer.
- James Grayman (born 1985), Antiguan high jumper.
- Cejhae Greene (born 1995), Antiguan sprinter.
- Quinton Griffith (born 1992), Antiguan footballer.
- Maurice Hope (born 1951), boxer from Antigua and Barbuda.
- Dale Jones (runner) (born 1964), runner from Antigua and Barbuda.
- S. D. Jones (1945 - 2008), American wrestler born in Antigua.
- Howard Lindsay (athlete) (born 1963), Olympic runner from Antigua and Barbuda.
- Danny Livingstone (1933 - 1988), Antiguan cricketer.
- Joella Lloyd (born 2002), Antiguan sprinter and runner.
- Kurt Looby (born 1984), Antiguan basketball player.
- Jody Maginley (born 1995), tennis player from Antigua and Barbuda.
- Tony Merrick (born 1963), Antiguan cricketer.
- Norvel Pelle (born 1993), basketball player born in Antigua and Barbuda.
- Viv Richards (born 1952), cricketer from Antigua.
- Richie Richardson (born 1962), cricketer born in Five Islands Village.
- Andy Roberts (born 1951), cricketer born in Urlings Village.
- Carl Simon (born 1973), Antiguan cricketer.
- Heather Samuel (born 1970), Antiguan Olympic sprinter.
- Tamorley Thomas (born 1983), Antiguan footballer.
- Sydney Walling (1907 - 2009), Antiguan cricketer.
- Chavaughn Walsh (born 1987), Antiguan sprinter.
- Sonia Williams (born 1979), track and field sprint athlete from Antigua and Barbuda.

== Educators and scientists ==
- Nellie Robinson (educator) (1880 - 1972), educator and civil rights activist from Antigua.
- H. B. D. Woodcock (1867–1957), amateur botanist and jurist, born in Antigua and Barbuda.

== Entertainers ==
- Xiea Hull (born 1993), Antiguan model.
- Shermain Jeremy (born 1983), pageant winner.
- June Ambrose (born 1971), celebrity fashion designer and stylist.
- Veronica Yearwood, choreographer and dance company founder from Antigua.

== Entrepreneurs ==
- Antonio Joseph Camacho, Portuguese-born businessman and landowner.
- Robert De Niro (born 1943), runs a Nobu Hotel on Barbuda.
- Allen Stanford (born 1950), Texan business tycoon, convicted and sentenced to 110 years in prison for investment fraud.

== Musicians ==
- Au/Ra, singer raised in Antigua.
- Romeo Challenger (born 1950), drummer born in St. Johns, Antigua.
- DJ Red Alert, disc Jockey born in Antigua.
- Claudette Peters (born 1979), singer and songwriter from Antigua and Barbuda.

== Politicians and activists ==
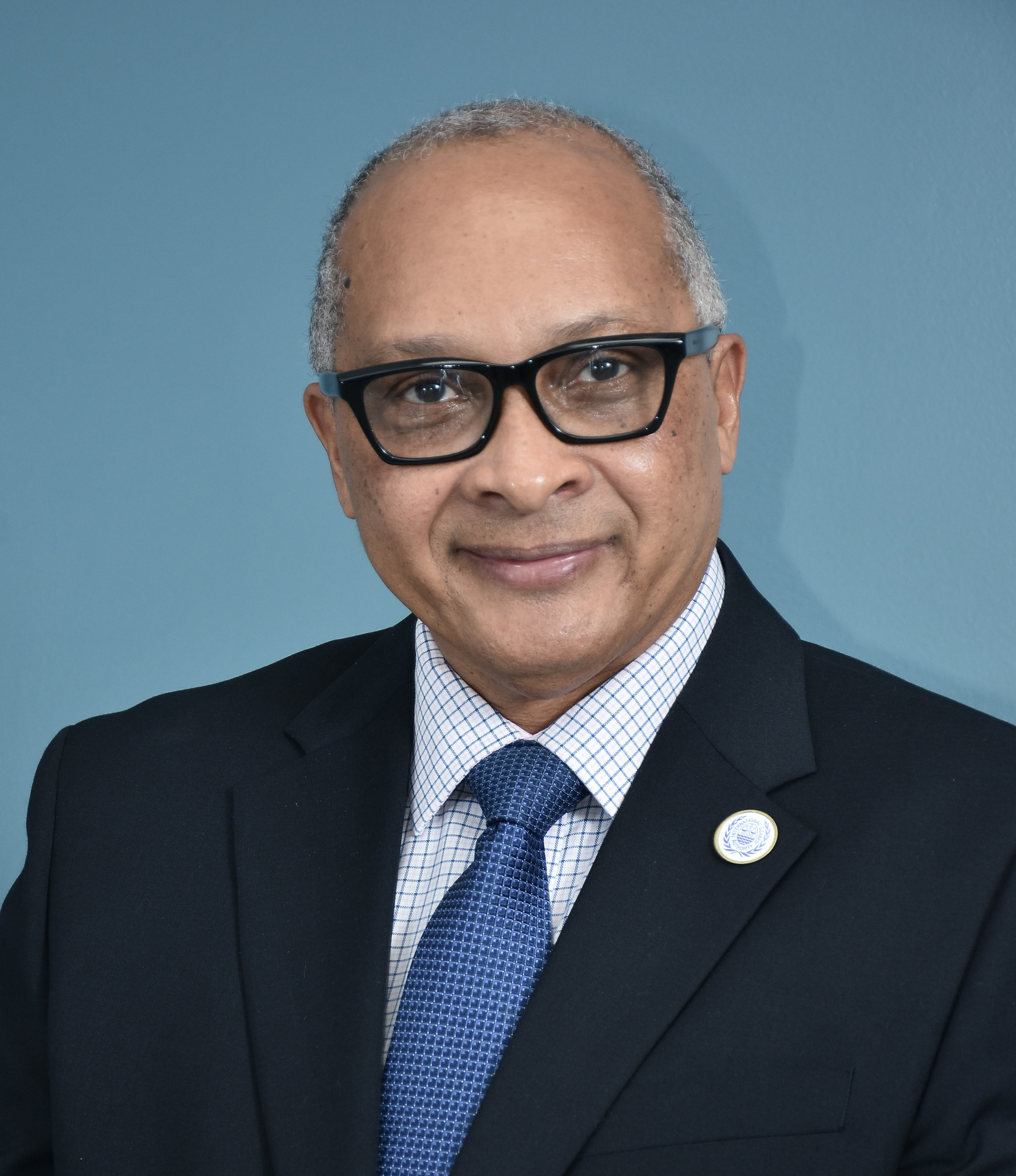
- Ambassador of Antigua and Barbados, Dwight Cuthert Revire Gardiner, in 2025
  John William Ashe (1954 - 2016), Antiguan diplomat and politician.
- Lester Bird (1938 - 2021), Antiguan politician and former Prime Minister of Antigua and Barbuda.
- Vere Cornwall Bird (1910 - 1999), first Prime Minister of Antigua and Barbuda.
- Gaston Browne, Prime Minister of Antigua
- James Carlisle (born 1937), former governor-general of Antigua and Barbuda.
- Delano Christopher (1950 - 2024), first woman to serve as a police commissioner in the Caribbean.
- Charles Fernandez (born 1954), politician from Antigua and Barbuda.
- Dwight Cuthbert Revire Gardiner (born 1962), ambassador and diplomat for Antigua and Barbuda.
- Tim Hector (1942 - 2002), Antiguan politician and civil rights activist.
- Wilfred Jacobs (1919 - 1995), Antiguan politician.
- Rick James (1939–2018), actor and politician/activist who founded the Free and Fair Elections League and unsuccessfully contested in the 1999 Antigua Freedom Party
- ABilly S. Jones-Hennin (1942 - 2024), civil rights activist born in St. Johns, Antigua.
- Deborah-Mae Lovell, diplomat from Antigua and Barbuda.
- Harold Lovell (born 1955), politician from Antigua.
- Anthony Musgrave (1828 - 1888), British colonial administrator born at Antigua.
- Sheila Roseau, women´s rights advocate from Antigua and Barbuda.
- Ronald Sanders (diplomat) (born 1948), ambassador from Antigua and Barbuda.
- Baldwin Spencer (born 1948), trade unionist and politician.
- Torsten Stenzel (born 1971), German music producer and consulate to Antigua and Barbuda.
- George Walter (1948 - 2008), politician from Antigua and Barbuda.
- Sir William Young FRS, first governor of Dominica

== Religious leaders ==
- George Bennett (bishop) (1875 - 1946), Roman Catholic bishop born on Antigua.
- Denzil Angus Carty (1904 - 1975), civil rights activist and Episcopal priest born in St. John's Antigua.

== Writers ==
- Zahra Airall, writer and playwright from Antigua and Barbuda.
- Melvin Claxton, Pulitzer Prize-winning journalist and author.
- Winston Derrick (1951 - 2013), Antiguan journalist.
- Joanne C. Hillhouse (born 1973), Antiguan writer and journalist.
- Jamaica Kincaid (born 1949), Antiguan writer.
- Marie-Elena John, writer born and raised in Antigua.

== See also ==
- Antiguans and Barbudans in the United Kingdom
- List of ambassadors of Antigua and Barbuda to China
- List of ambassadors of Antigua and Barbuda to the United States
- High Commissioner for Antigua and Barbuda to the United Kingdom
