= Antigua =

Island in Antigua and Barbuda

Native name: Aanteega
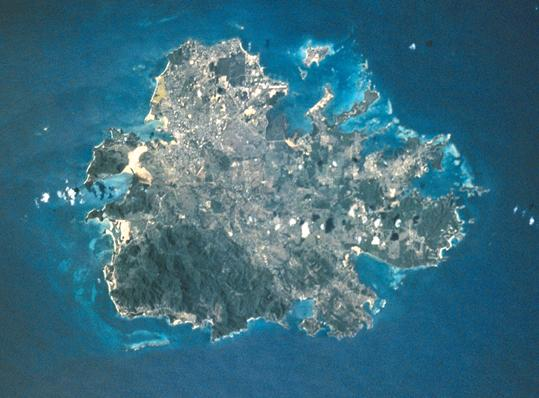
- Aerial view of Antigua

- Map of Antigua showing the parishes

- Location within the Caribbean Location within Lesser Antilles Location within Antigua and Barbuda

Geography
- Location: Caribbean Sea
- Coordinates: 17°05′06″N 61°48′00″W
- Archipelago: Leeward Islands
- Total islands: 1
- Area: 281 km^{2} (108 sq mi)
- Coastline: 87 km (54.1 mi)
- Highest elevation: 402 m (1319 ft)
- Highest point: Boggy Peak

Administration
- Antigua and Barbuda
- Largest settlement: St. John's (pop. 22,000)

Demographics
- Population: 95,882 (July 2018)
- Pop. density: 341.22/km^{2} (883.76/sq mi)
- Ethnic groups: 87.12% Black, 3.86% Other Mixed Race, 1.7% White, 5.64% Other

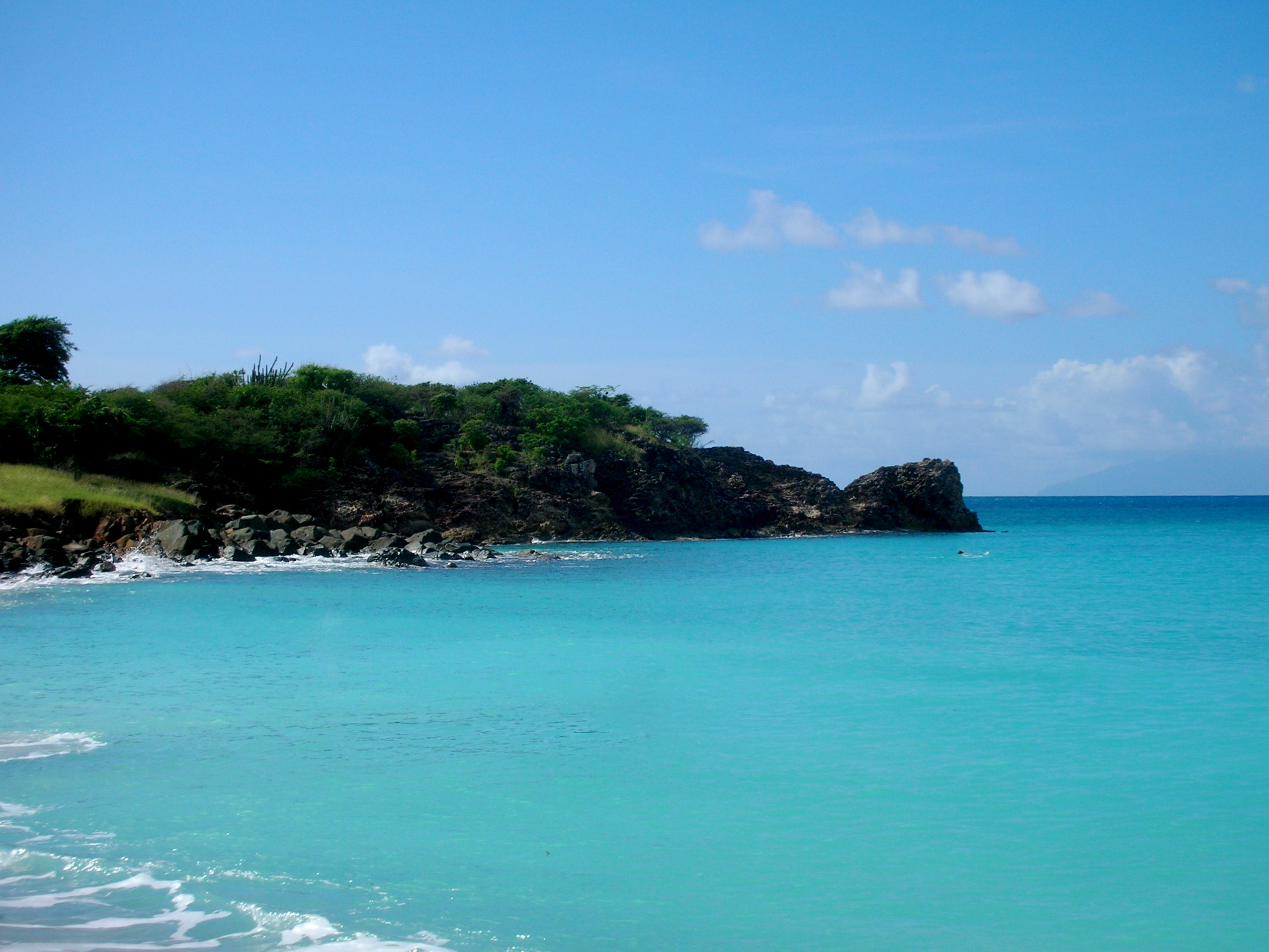
Turner Beach in Antigua

Antigua (Note: /ænˈtiːɡə/ ann-TEE-gə; Antiguan Creole: Aanteega, also known as Waladli or Wadadli by the local population) is an island in the Lesser Antilles. It is one of the Leeward Islands in the Caribbean region and the most populous island of the country of Antigua and Barbuda. Antigua and Barbuda became an independent state within the Commonwealth of Nations on 1 November 1981.

The island's perimeter is roughly 87 km (54 mi) and its area 281 km^{2} (108 sq mi). Its population was 83,191 (at the 2011 Census). The economy is mainly reliant on tourism, with the agricultural sector serving the domestic market.

More than 22,000 people live in the main city, St. John's. The city is situated in the north-west and has a deep harbour which is able to accommodate large cruise ships. Most of the population lives in the island's Central Plain. Other leading population settlements are All Saints (3,412) and Liberta (2,239), according to the 2001 census.

English Harbour on the south-eastern coast provides one of the largest deep water, protected harbors in the Eastern Caribbean. It is the site of UNESCO World Heritage Site Nelson's Dockyard, a restored British colonial naval station named after Vice-Admiral Horatio Nelson. English Harbour and the neighbouring village of Falmouth are yachting and sailing destinations and provisioning centres. During Antigua Sailing Week, at the end of April and beginning of May, an annual regatta brings a number of sailing vessels and sailors to the island to take part in sporting events. Every December for the past 60 years, Antigua has been home to one of the largest charter yacht shows, welcoming super-yachts from around the world.

== Etymology ==
Antigua means "ancient" or "old" in Spanish.

On his 1493 voyage, honouring a vow, Christopher Columbus named many islands after different aspects of St. Mary, including Montserrat and Guadeloupe. On his way back to Spain, he named the island Santa María de la Antigua. Some sources say he named the island after a church in Seville called Santa María de la Antigua. However, there is no church by that name in Seville. Columbus may have actually named the island in honor of the Santa María de la Antigua chapel in Seville Cathedral, or more specifically in honor of the iconic mural Virgen de la Antigua (or Santa María de la Antigua) in Seville Cathedral.

The name Waladli comes from the island's Indigenous inhabitants and means approximately "our own". Wadadli is the Creole approximation of the original name.

== History ==
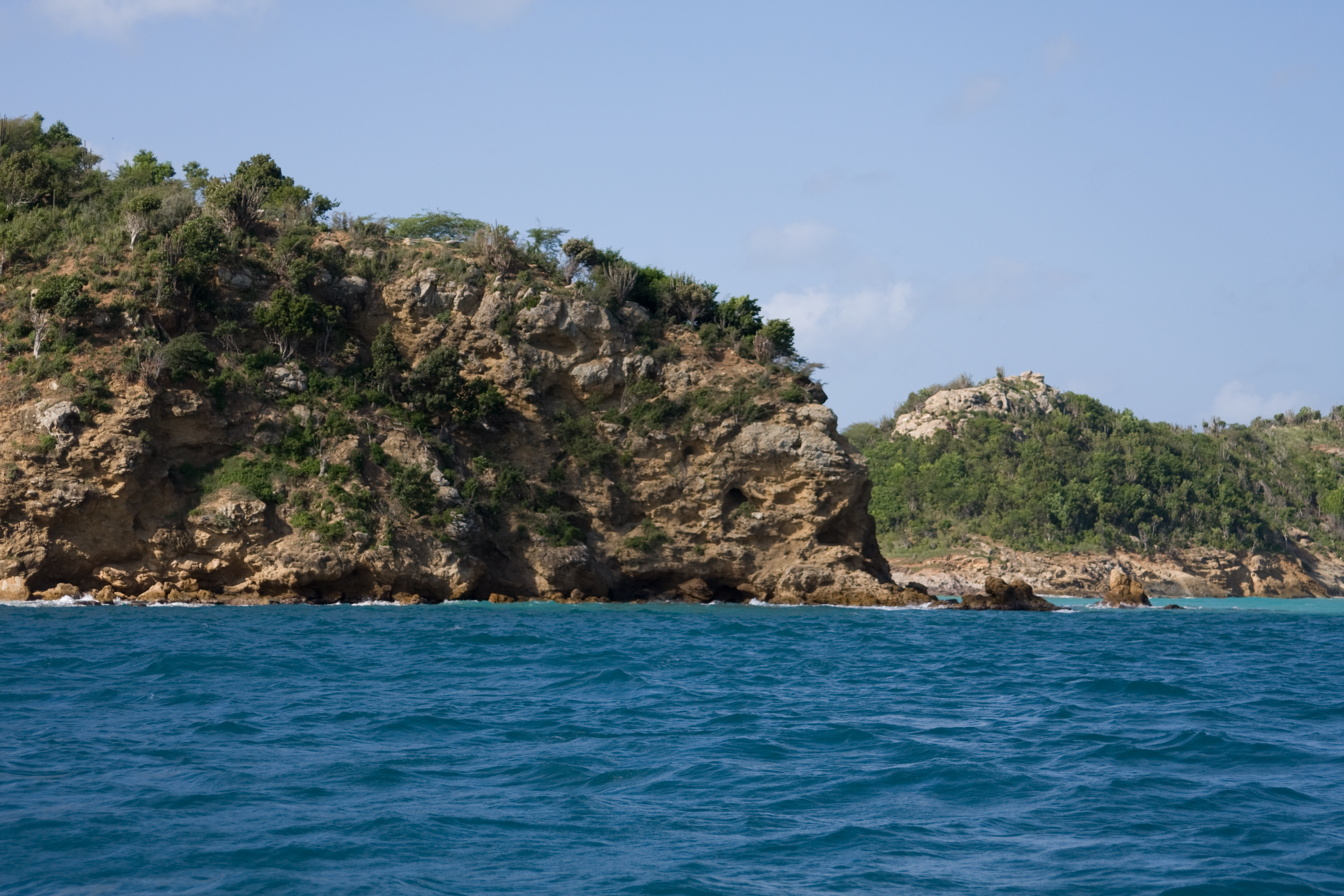
Rocky shoreline near St. John's

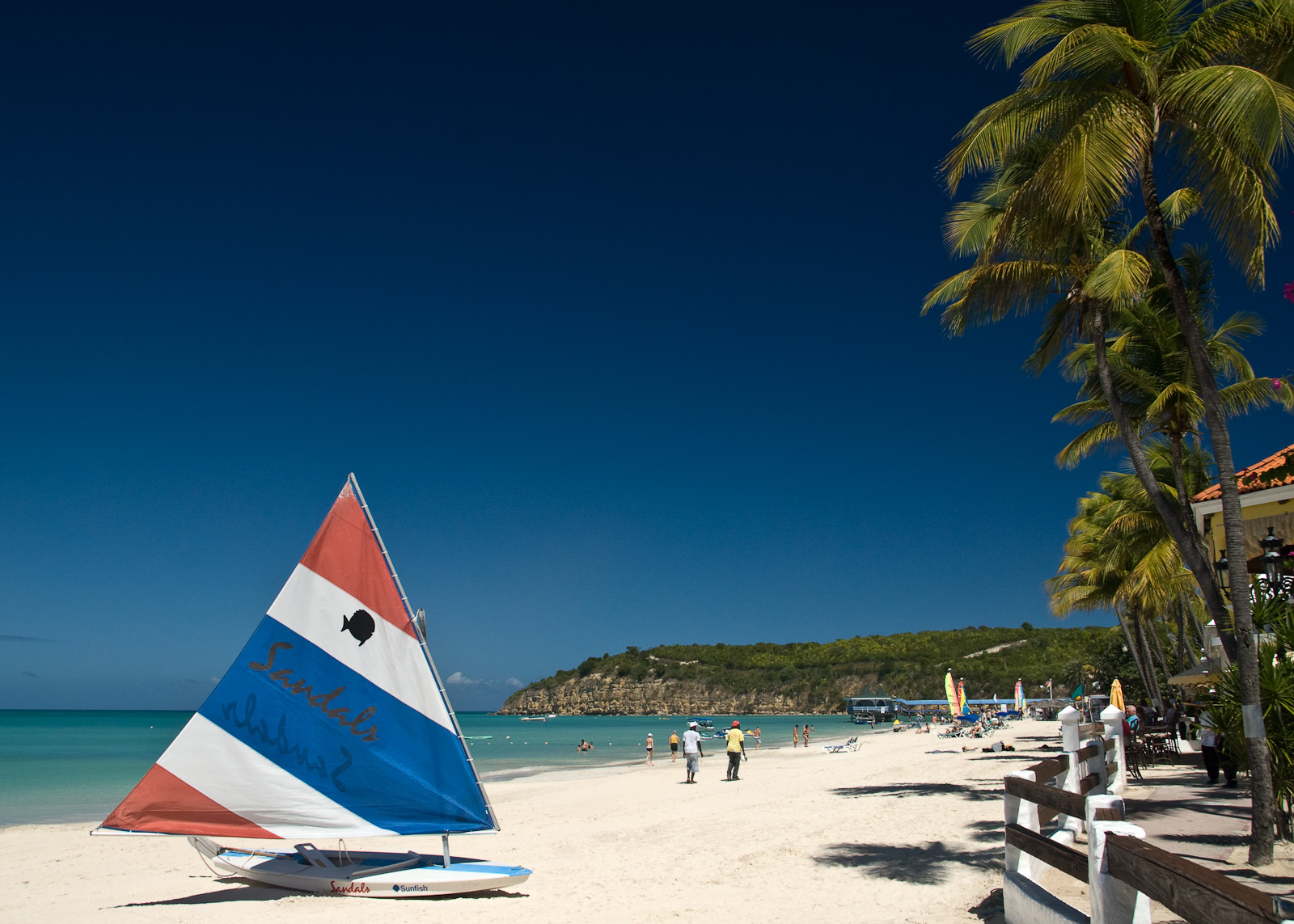
Dickenson Bay beach, Antigua

=== Early Antiguans ===
The first inhabitants were the Guanahatabey people. Eventually, the Arawak migrated from the mainland, followed by the Carib. Prior to European colonization, Christopher Columbus was the first European to visit Antigua, in 1493.

The Arawak were the first well-documented group of indigenous people to settle Antigua. They paddled to the island by canoe (piragua) from present-day Venezuela, pushed out by the Carib, another indigenous people. The Arawak introduced agriculture to Antigua and Barbuda. Among other crops, they cultivated the Antiguan "black" pineapple. They also grew corn, sweet potatoes (white with firmer flesh than the bright orange "sweet potato" grown in the United States), chili peppers, cassava, guava, tobacco, and cotton.

Some of the vegetables listed, such as corn and sweet potatoes, continue to be staples of Antiguan cuisine. Colonists took them to Europe, and from there, they spread around the world. For example, a popular Antiguan dish, dukuna (/ˈduːkuːnɑː/), is a sweet, steamed dumpling made from grated sweet potatoes, flour and spices. Another staple, fungi (/ˈfuːndʒi/), is a cooked paste made of cornmeal and water.

Most of the Arawak left Antigua about A.D. 1100. Those who remained were raided by the Carib coming from Venezuela. According to The Catholic Encyclopedia, the Caribs' superior weapons and seafaring prowess allowed them to defeat most Arawak nations in the West Indies. They enslaved some and cannibalised others. Watson points out that the Caribs had a much more warlike culture than the Arawak.

The indigenous people of the West Indies built excellent sea vessels, which they used to sail the Atlantic and Caribbean resulting in much of the South American and the Caribbean islands being populated by the Arawak and Carib. Their descendants live throughout South America, particularly Brazil, Venezuela and Colombia. According to A Brief History of the Caribbean, infectious diseases introduced from Europe, high rates of malnutrition and enslavement led to a rapid population decline among the Caribbean's native population. There are some differences of opinions as to the relative importance of these causes.

=== English and British Colonisation ===
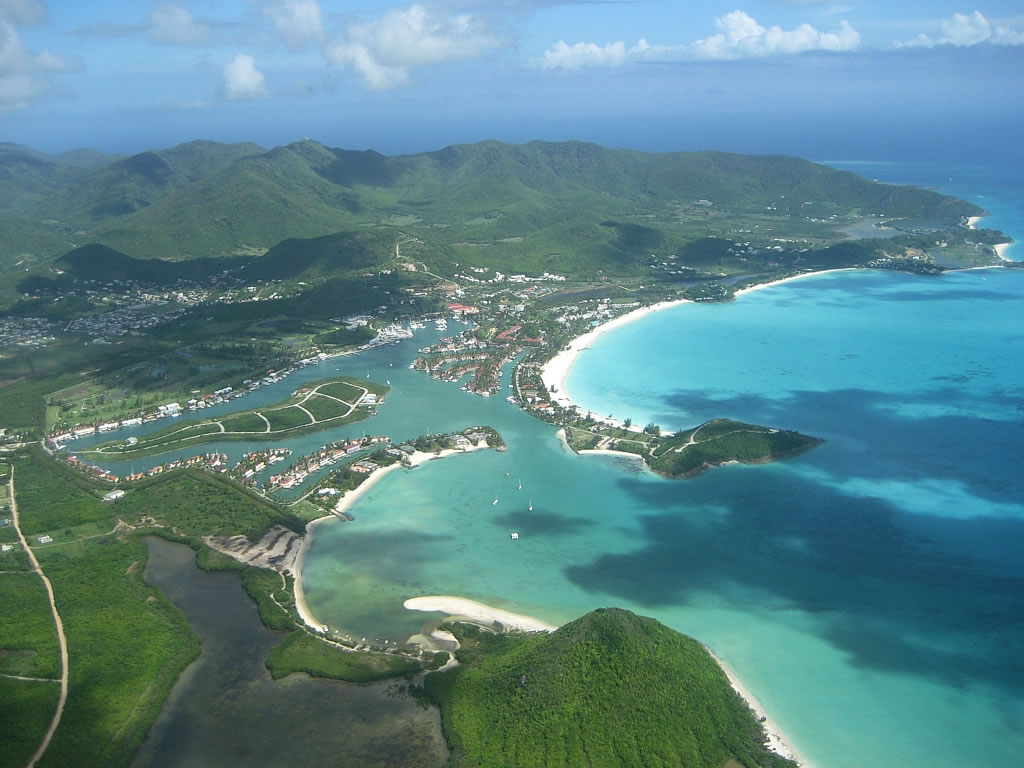
Aerial view of Jolly Harbour on the western coast of Antigua

In 1632, a group of English colonists left St. Kitts to settle on Antigua. Christopher Codrington, an Englishman, established the first permanent English settlement on the island. Antigua rapidly developed as a profitable sugar colony. For a large portion of Antigua's history, the island was considered Britain's "Gateway to the Caribbean". It was on the major sailing routes among the region's resource-rich colonies. Lord Horatio Nelson, a major figure in Antigua's history, arrived in the late 18th century to defend the island's commercial shipping prowess.

=== Slavery ===
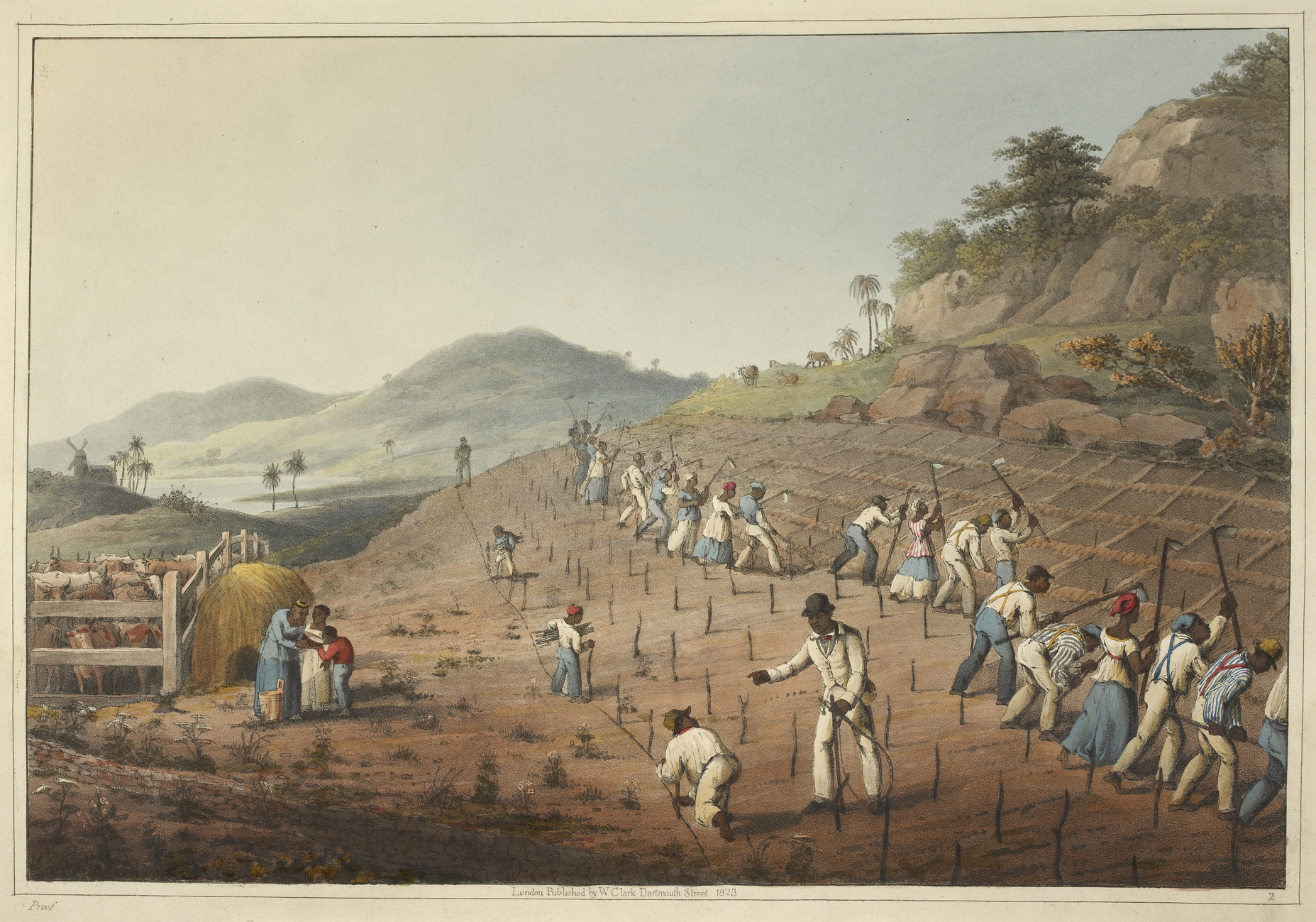
Slaves planting and tilling, 1823

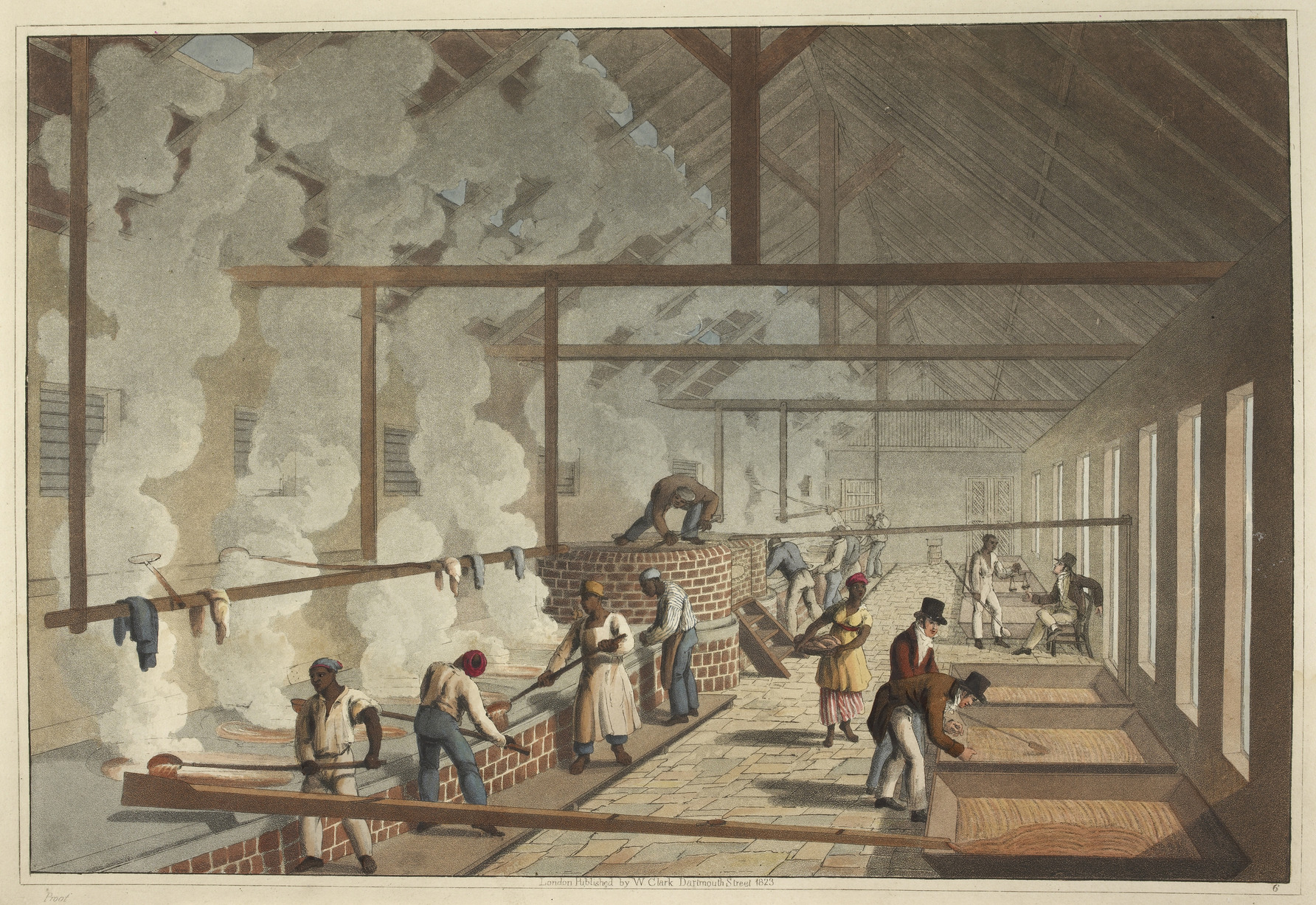
Slaves working in the boiling house, 1823

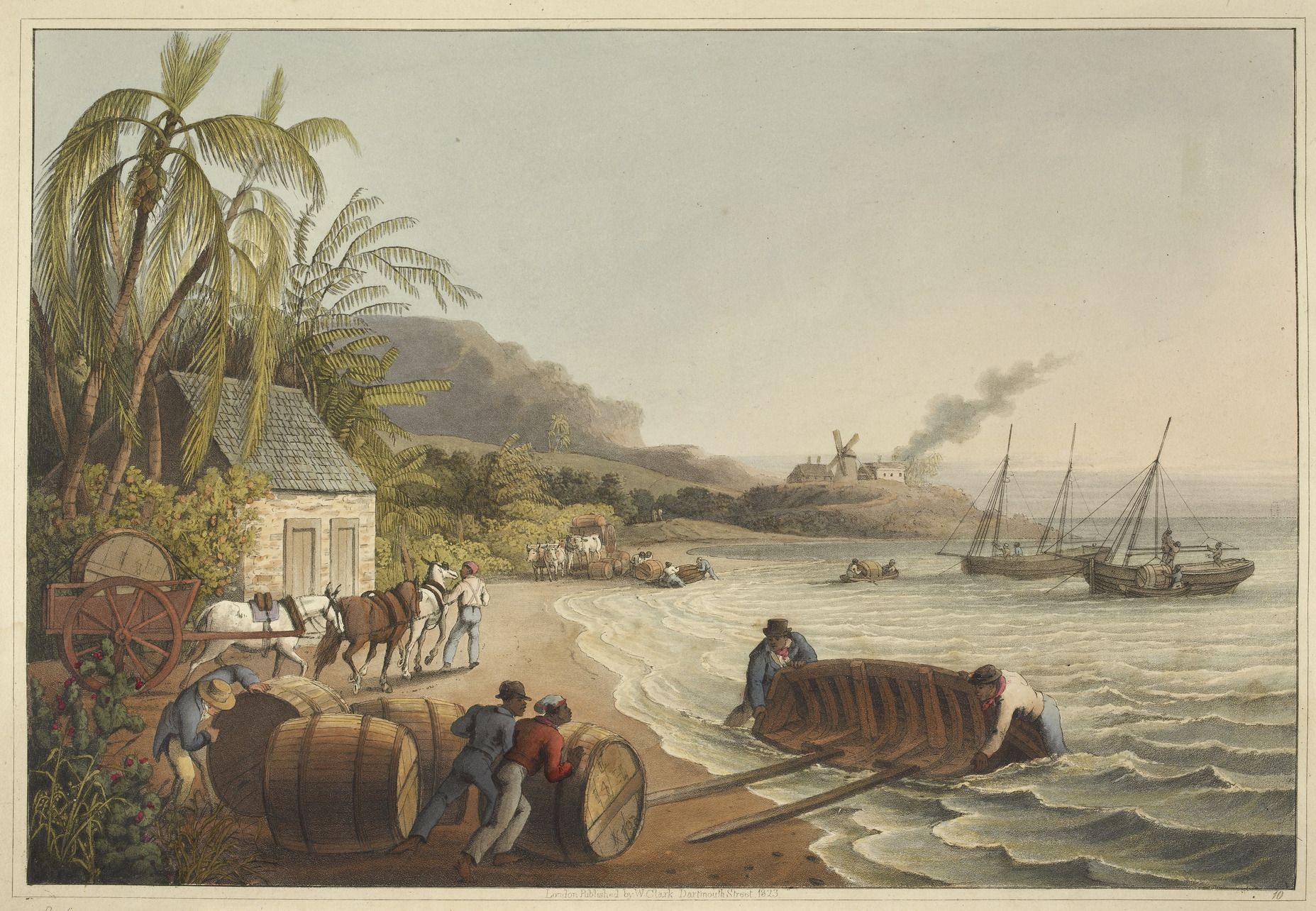
Slaves loading barrels into a boat, 1823

Sugar became Antigua's main crop in about 1674, when Christopher Codrington (c. 1640–1698) settled at Betty's Hope plantation. He came from Barbados, bringing the latest sugar technology with him. Betty's Hope, Antigua's first full-scale sugar plantation, was so successful that other planters turned from tobacco to sugar. This resulted in their importing slaves to work the sugar cane crops.

According to A Brief History of the Caribbean, many West Indian colonists initially tried to use locals as slaves. These groups succumbed easily to disease and/or malnutrition, and died by the thousands. The enslaved Africans adapted better to the new environment and thus became the number-one choice of unpaid labour; they also provided medical services and skilled labour, including carpentry, for their masters. However, the West African slave population in the Caribbean also had a high mortality rate, which was offset by regular imports of very high numbers of new slaves from West and Central Africa.

Sugar cane was one of the most gruelling and dangerous crops slaves were forced to cultivate. Harvesting cane required backbreaking long days in sugar cane fields under the hot island sun. Sugar cane spoiled quickly after harvest, and the milling process was slow and inefficient, forcing the mill and boiling house to operate 24 hours a day during harvest season. Sugar mills and boiling houses were two of the most dangerous places for slaves to work on sugar plantations. In mills wooden or metal rollers were used to crush cane plants and extract the juices. Slaves were at risk of getting their limbs stuck and ripped off in the machines. Similarly, in sugar boiling houses slaves worked under extremely high temperatures and at the risk of being burned in the boiling sugar mixture or getting their limbs stuck.

Today, collectors prize the uniquely designed colonial furniture built by West Indian slaves. Many of these works feature what are now considered "traditional" motifs, such as pineapples, fish and stylized serpents.

By the mid-1770s, the number of slaves had increased to 37,500, up from 12,500 in 1713. The white population, in contrast, had fallen from 5,000 to below 3,000. The slaves lived in wretched and overcrowded conditions and could be mistreated or even killed by their owners with impunity. The Slave Act of 1723 made arbitrary murder of slaves a crime, but did not do much to ease their lives.

Unrest against enslavement among the island's enslaved population became increasingly common. In 1729, a man named Hercules was hanged, drawn and quartered and three others were burnt alive, for conspiring to kill the slave owner Nathaniel Crump and his family. In 1736, an enslaved man called "Prince Klaas" (whose slave name was Court) allegedly planned to incite a slave rebellion on the island. Court was crowned "King of the Coromantees" in a pasture outside the capital of St. John's. The coronation appeared to be just a colourful spectacle but was, for the enslaved people, a ritual declaration of war on the colonists. From information obtained from other slaves, the colonists discovered the plot and implemented a brutal crackdown on suspected rebels. Prince Klaas and four accomplices were caught and executed on the breaking wheel. (However, some doubts exist about Court's guilt.) Six of the rebels were hanged in chains and starved to death, and another 58 were burnt at the stake. The site of these executions is now the Antiguan Recreation Ground.

The American War of Independence in the late 18th century disrupted the Caribbean sugar trade. At the same time, public opinion in Great Britain gradually turned against slavery. "Traveling ... at slavery's end, [Joseph] Sturge and [Thomas] Harvey (1838 ...) found few married slaves residing together or even on the same estate. Slaveholders often counted as 'married' only those slaves with mates on the estate." (Note: Joseph Sturge, English abolitionist) (Note: Thomas Harvey) (Note: Estate, real estate and houses on it) Great Britain abolished the slave trade in 1807, and all existing slaves were emancipated in 1834.

=== Administration of Lord Nelson ===
Horatio Nelson (who was created 1st Viscount Nelson in 1801) was Senior Naval Officer of the Leeward Islands from 1784 to 1787 on HMS Boreas. During his tenure, he tried to enforce the Navigation Acts. These acts prohibited trade with the newly formed United States of America. Most of the merchants in Antigua depended upon trading with the USA, so many of them despised Captain Nelson. As a result, he was unable to get a promotion for some time after his stint on the island.

Unlike the Antiguan merchants, Nelson had a positive view of the controversial Navigation Acts:

The Americans were at this time trading with our islands, taking advantage of the register of their ships, which had been issued while they were British subjects. Nelson knew that, by the Navigation Act, no foreigners, directly or indirectly, are permitted to carry on any trade with these possessions. He knew, also, that the Americans had made themselves foreigners with regard to England; they had disregarded the ties of blood and language when they acquired the independence which they had been led on to claim, unhappily for themselves, before they were fit for it; and he was resolved that they should derive no profit from those ties now. Foreigners they had made themselves, and as foreigners they were to be treated.

Nelson said: "The Antiguan Colonists are as great rebels as ever were in America, had they the power to show it."

A dockyard started in 1725, to provide a base for a squadron of British ships whose main function was to patrol the West Indies and thus maintain Britain's sea power, was later named "Nelson's Dockyard" in his honour.

While Nelson was stationed on Antigua, he frequently visited the nearby island of Nevis, where he met and married a young widow, Fanny Nisbet, who had previously married the son of a plantation family on Nevis.

=== 1918 labour unrest ===
Following the foundation of the Ulotrichian Universal Union, a friendly society which acted as a trade union (which were banned), the sugar cane workers were ready to confront the plantation owners when they slashed their wages. The cane workers went on strike and rioted when their leaders were arrested.

=== Independence ===
In 1967, with Barbuda and the tiny island of Redonda, Antigua became an associated state of the Commonwealth, and in November 1981 it was disassociated from Britain.

=== U.S. government presence ===
Commissioned 9 August 1956, the Naval Facility (NAVFAC) Antigua was one of the shore terminal stations that were part of the Sound Surveillance System (SOSUS) and the Integrated Undersea Surveillance System (IUSS), which were used to track Soviet submarines. NAVFAC Antigua was decommissioned 4 February 1984.

From 1958 through 1960 the United States installed the Missile Impact Location System (MILS) in the Atlantic Missile Range, later the Eastern Range, to localize the splashdowns of test missile nose cones. MILS was developed and installed by the same entities that had completed the first phase of the Atlantic SOSUS system. A MILS installation consisting of both a target array for precision location and a broad ocean area system for good positions outside the target area was installed at Antigua, 1,300 nmi (1,500 mi; 2,400 km) downrange. The island was the second downrange MILS installation with the furthest being 4,400 nmi (5,100 mi; 8,100 km) downrange at Ascension Island.

Until 7 July 2015, the United States Air Force maintained a small base near the airport, designated Detachment 1, 45th Operations Group, 45th Space Wing (known as Antigua Air Station). The mission provided high rate telemetry data for the Eastern Range and its space launches. The unit was deactivated due to US government budget cuts and the property given to the Antiguan Government.

== Demographics ==
=== Census data ===
These figures do not include the island of Barbuda.

| Q48 Ethnic | Counts | % |
|---|---|---|
| African descendent | 72,473 | 87.12% |
| Caucasian/White | 1,396 | 1.68% |
| East Indian/India | 940 | 1.13% |
| Mixed (Black/White) | 740 | 0.89% |
| Mixed (Other) | 3,209 | 3.86% |
| Hispanic | 2,323 | 2.79% |
| Syrian/Lebanese | 568 | 0.68% |
| Other | 795 | 0.96% |
| Don't know/Not stated | 749 | 0.90% |
| Total | 83,191 | 100.00% |

| Q58. Country of birth | Counts | % |
|---|---|---|
| Africa | 296 | 0.36% |
| Other Latin or North American countries | 164 | 0.20% |
| Antigua and Barbuda | 56,620 | 68.06% |
| Other Caribbean countries | 765 | 0.92% |
| Canada | 350 | 0.42% |
| Other Asian countries | 389 | 0.47% |
| Other European countries | 301 | 0.36% |
| Dominica | 3,629 | 4.36% |
| Dominican Republic | 2,076 | 2.50% |
| Guyana | 5,993 | 7.20% |
| Jamaica | 4,408 | 5.30% |
| Montserrat | 628 | 0.76% |
| St. Kitts and Nevis | 360 | 0.43% |
| St. Lucia | 597 | 0.72% |
| St. Vincent and the Grenadines | 662 | 0.80% |
| Syria | 296 | 0.36% |
| Trinidad and Tobago | 499 | 0.60% |
| United Kingdom | 835 | 1.00% |
| USA | 2,590 | 3.11% |
| USVI United States Virgin Islands | 394 | 0.47% |
| Not Stated | 1,337 | 1.61% |
| Total | 83,191 | 100.00% |

| Q71 Country of Citizenship 1 | Counts | % |
|---|---|---|
| Antigua and Barbuda | 67,569 | 81.22% |
| Other Caribbean countries | 547 | 0.66% |
| Canada | 195 | 0.23% |
| Other Asian and Middle Eastern countries | 422 | 0.51% |
| Dominica | 1,754 | 2.11% |
| Dominican Republic | 1,342 | 1.61% |
| Guyana | 3,674 | 4.42% |
| Jamaica | 3,316 | 3.99% |
| Montserrat | 261 | 0.31% |
| St. Lucia | 326 | 0.39% |
| St. Vincent and the Grenadines | 319 | 0.38% |
| Trinidad and Tobago | 194 | 0.23% |
| United Kingdom | 442 | 0.53% |
| USA | 1,322 | 1.59% |
| Other countries | 494 | 0.59% |
| Not Stated | 1,015 | 1.22% |
| Total | 83,191 | 100.00% |

| Q71 Country of Citizenship 2 (Country of Second/Dual Citizenship) | Counts | % |
|---|---|---|
| Other Caribbean countries | 858 | 6.73% |
| Canada | 451 | 3.53% |
| Other Asian and Middle Eastern countries | 238 | 1.86% |
| Dominica | 1,898 | 14.87% |
| Dominican Republic | 729 | 5.72% |
| Guyana | 2,257 | 17.69% |
| Jamaica | 1,103 | 8.64% |
| Montserrat | 345 | 2.70% |
| St. Lucia | 273 | 2.14% |
| St. Vincent and the Grenadines | 348 | 2.73% |
| Trinidad and Tobago | 317 | 2.48% |
| United Kingdom | 981 | 7.69% |
| USA | 2,560 | 20.06% |
| Other countries | 391 | 3.07% |
| Not Stated | 11 | 0.08% |
| Total | 12,759 | 100.00% |
| NotApp : | 70,432 | |

| Employment status | Counts | % |
|---|---|---|
| Employed | 38,534 | 60.92% |
| Unemployed | 4,435 | 7.01% |
| Inactive | 19,780 | 31.27% |
| Not stated | 504 | 0.80% |
| Total | 63,253 | 100.00% |
| NotApp : | 19,938 | |

| Q55 Internet Use | Counts | % |
|---|---|---|
| Yes | 40,429 | 48.60% |
| No | 41,238 | 49.57% |
| Don't know/Not stated | 1,524 | 1.83% |
| Total | 83,191 | 100.00% |

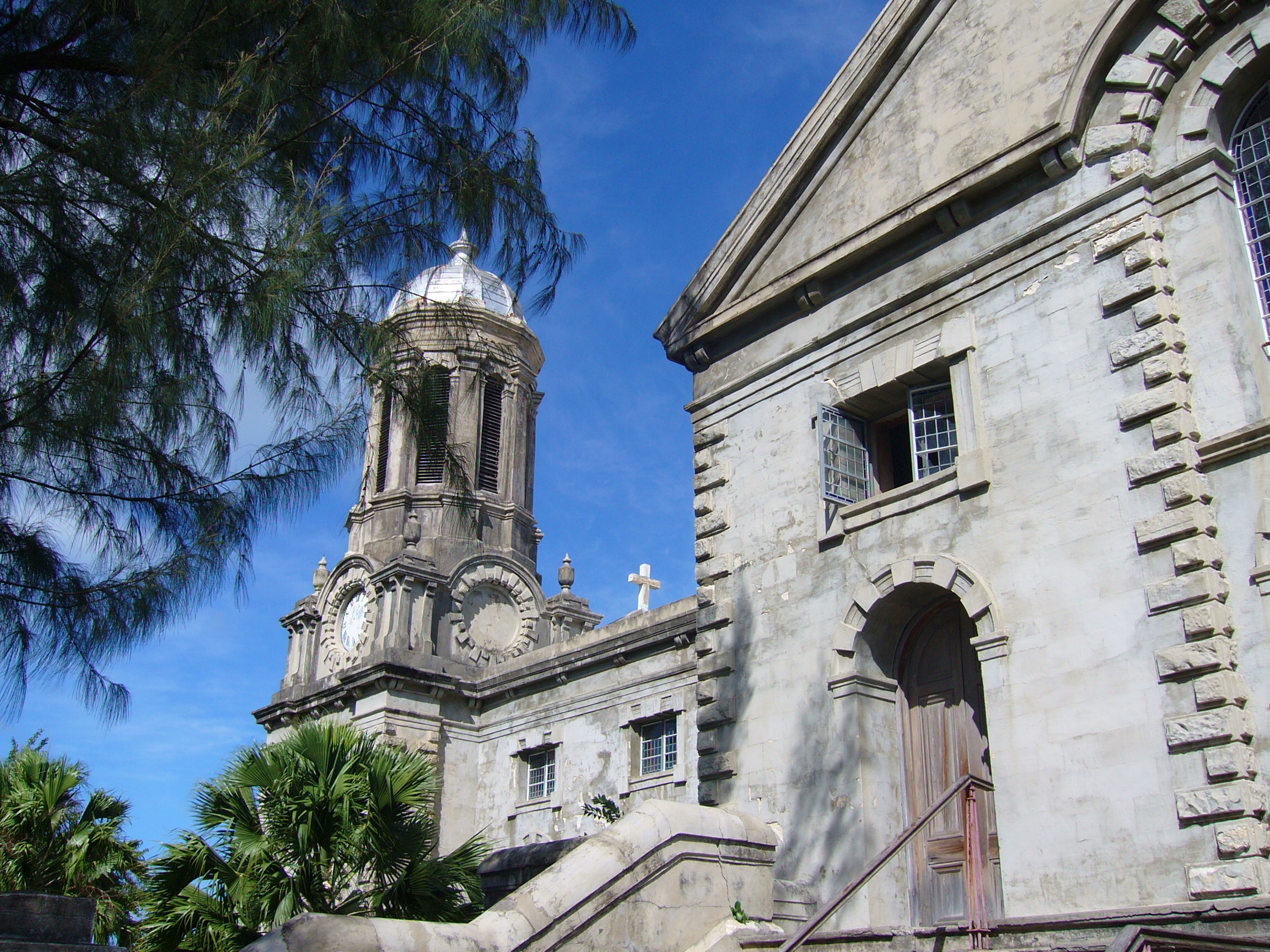
St John's Cathedral, Antigua

== Geography ==
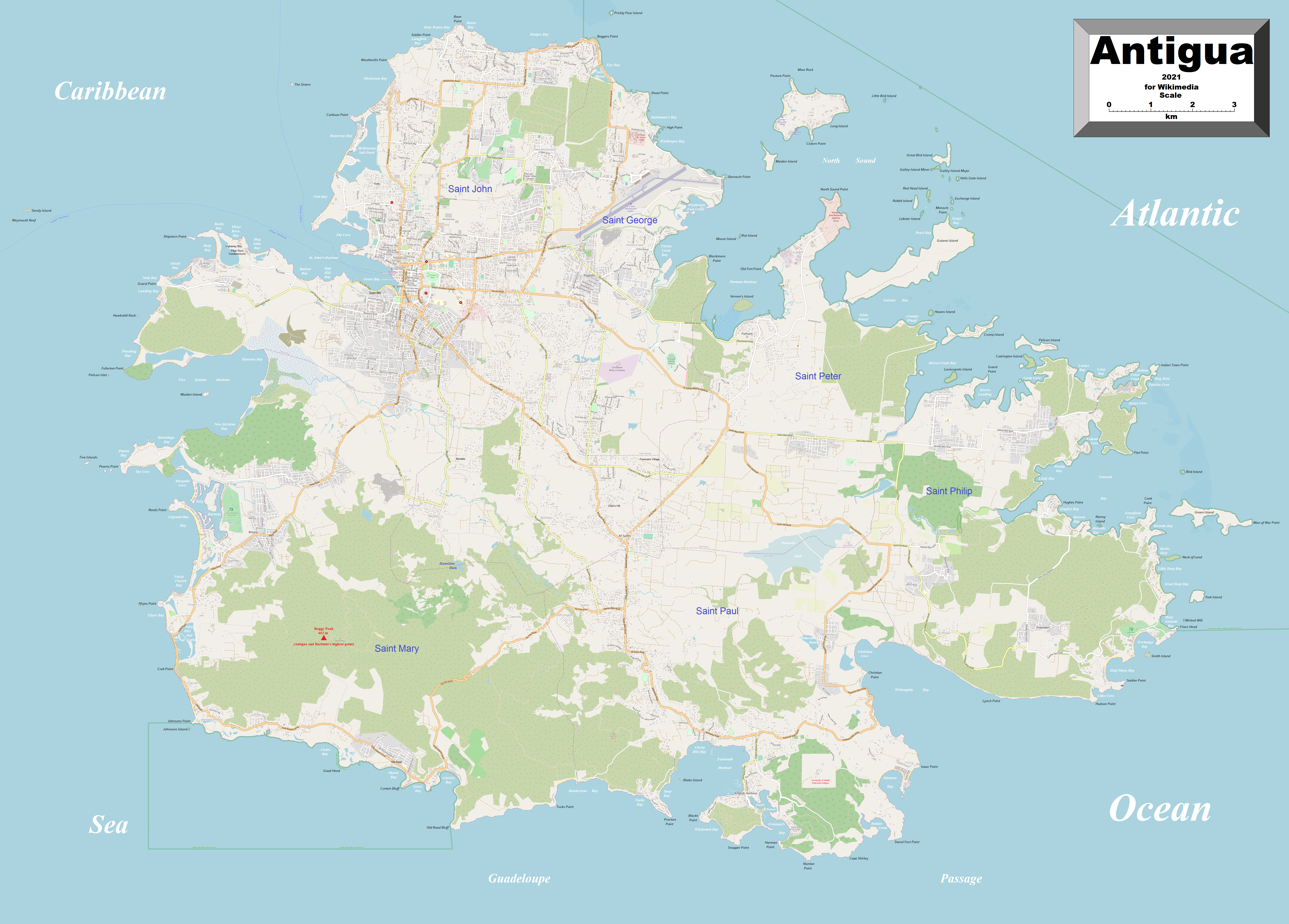
Enlargeable, detailed map of Antigua

Located in the Leeward Islands, Antigua has an area of 281 km^{2} (108 sq mi) with 87 km (54 mi) of coastline. The island is reputed to possess 365 beaches, one for every day of the year. The highest elevation on the island is 402 m (1,319 ft).

Various natural points, capes, and beaches around the island include: Boon Point, Beggars Point, Parham, Willikies, Hudson Point, English Harbour Town, Old Road Cape, Johnson's Point, Ffryes Point, Jennings, Five Islands, and Yepton Beach, and Runaway Beach.

Several natural harbours are formed by these points and capes, including: Fitches Creek Bay, between Beggars Point and Parham; Nonsuch Bay between Hudson Point and Willikies; Willoughby Bay, between Hudson Point and English Harbour Town; English Harbour leading into English Harbour Town; Falmouth Harbour recessing into Falmouth; Rendezvous Bay between Falmouth and Old Road Cape; Five Islands Harbour, between Jennings and Five Islands; and Green Bay, the main harbour at St. John's, between Yepton Beach and Runaway Beach.

=== Fauna ===
The Antiguan racer is among the rarest snakes in the world. The Lesser Antilles are home to four species of racers. All four have undergone severe range reductions; at least two subspecies are extinct and another, Alsophis antiguae, now occupies only 0.1 per cent of its historical range.

Griswold's ameiva (Ameiva griswoldi) is a species of lizard in the genus Ameiva. It is endemic to Antigua and Barbuda. It is found on both islands.

== Administrative divisions ==
The island is divided into six civil parishes: St. George, Saint Peter, Saint Philip, Saint Paul, Saint Mary, and Saint John. The parishes have no type of local government.

== Economy ==
The country's official currency is the East Caribbean dollar. Given the dominance of tourism, many prices in tourist-oriented businesses are shown in US dollars. The EC dollar is pegged to the US dollar at a varied rate and averages about US$1 = EC$2.7.

=== Tourism ===
Antigua's economy relies largely on tourism, and the island is promoted as a luxury Caribbean escape. Many hotels and resorts are located around the coastline. The island's single airport, VC Bird Airport, is served by several major airlines, including Virgin Atlantic, British Airways, American Airlines, United Airlines, Delta Air Lines, Caribbean Airlines, Air Canada, WestJet, and JetBlue. There is regular air service to Barbuda.

=== Education ===
Antigua has two international primary/secondary schools: CCSET International, which offers the Ontario Secondary School Diploma, and Island Academy, which offers the International Baccalaureate. There are also many other private schools but these institutions tend to follow the same local curriculum (CXCs) as government schools.

The island of Antigua currently has two foreign-owned for-profit offshore medical schools, the American University of Antigua (AUA), founded in 2004, and The University of Health Sciences Antigua (UHSA), founded in 1982. The island's medical schools cater mostly to foreign students but contribute to the local economy and health care.

=== Online gambling ===
Antigua was one of the first nations to legalize, license, and regulate online gambling and is a primary location for incorporation of online gambling companies. In 2003, Antigua and Barbuda initiated a WTO dispute settlement process with the United States, arguing that although some forms of Internet gambling, such as betting on horse races, are legal in the United States, the Wire Act, the Travel Act and the Illegal Gambling Business Act criminalize all cross-border gambling, constituting a discriminatory measure prohibited under the GATS. In 2004, a panel of the WTO Dispute Settlement Body found that the United States failed to accord services and service suppliers of Antigua treatment no less favorable than that accorded to its own services and service suppliers.

In 2006, the United States Congress voted to approve the Unlawful Internet Gambling Enforcement Act which criminalized the operations of offshore gambling operators which take wagers from American-based gamblers. This was a prima facie violation of the GATS treaty obligations enforced by the WTO, resulting in a series of rulings unfavourable to the US.

On 21 December 2007, an Article 22 arbitration panel ruled that the United States' failure to comply with WTO rules would attract a US$21 million sanction.

The WTO ruling was notable in two respects:

First, although technically a victory for Antigua, the $21 million was far less than the US$3.5 billion which had been sought; one of the three arbitrators was sufficiently bothered by the propriety of this that he issued a dissenting opinion.

Second, a rider to the arbitration ruling affirmed the right of Antigua to take retaliatory steps in view of the prior failure of the US to comply with GATS. These included the rare, but not unprecedented, right to disregard intellectual property obligations to the US.

Antigua's obligations to the US in respect of patents, copyright, and trademarks are affected. In particular, Berne Convention copyright is in question, and also material not covered by the Berne convention, including TRIPS accord obligations to the US. Antigua may thus disregard the WIPO treaty on intellectual property rights, and therefore the US implementation of that treaty (the Digital Millennium Copyright Act, or DMCA)—at least up to the limit of compensation.

Since there is no appeal to the WTO from an Arbitration panel of this kind, it represents the last legal word from the WTO on the matter. Antigua is therefore able to recoup some of the claimed loss of trade by hosting (and taxing) companies whose business model depends on immunity from TRIPS provisions.

Software company SlySoft was based in Antigua, allowing it to avoid nations with laws that are tough on anti-circumvention of technological copyright measures, in particular the DMCA in the United States.

On 3 June 2024, US Ambassador to Antigua and Barbuda Roger Nyhus stated that the US might offer Antigua and Barbuda concessions to resolve the longstanding dispute over the $21 million compensatory amount.

=== Banking ===
Swiss American Bank Ltd, later renamed Global Bank of Commerce, Ltd, was formed in April 1983 and became the first offshore international financial institution governed by the International Business Corporations, Act of 1982 to become a licensed bank in Antigua. The bank was later sued by the United States for failure to release forfeited funds from one of its account holders. Swiss American Bank was founded by Bruce Rappaport.

Established in June 1994 as the East European International Bank, the European Union Bank (EUB) (Russian: Банк Европейского Союза (БЕС)), which was Antigua's first internet bank and was associated with Alex Konanykhin, who had business interests with numerous senior KGB officials, (Note: Alex Konanykhin has business interests with numerous senior KGB officials including Leonid Shebarshin and Nikolai Leonov through the 1991 established think tank Russian National Economic Security Service (Russian: Российской национальной службы экономической безопасности) at which Shebarshin and Leonov were president and vice president, respectively.) was shut down in 1996 by Antiguan authorities because the bank had failed to file its 1994 audit and was placed in receivership on 8 August 1997 with two Russians listed as bank directors, Vitali Papsuev (Russian: Виталий Папсуев) (Note: Vitali Papsuev (Russian: Виталий Папсуев) allegedly had property in the Bronx.) and Sergei Ushakov (Russian: Сергей Ушаков). (Note: Sergei Ushakov (Russian: Сергей Ушаков), who is from Saint Petersburg, allegedly had property in Richmond Hill in greater Toronto. Ushakov is a close friend of Vladimir Putin. From 1974 to 2002, Ushakov was in the same KGB-FSB department as Evgeniy Plyusnin (Russian: Евгений Плюснин). Later, in 2002, Ushakov became the first deputy chairman of the Federal Security Service, which formally includes the presidential security service of Russia, and in 2003 became head of the administrative department and security service at Gazprom and also heads the board of Gazfond.) (Note: Evgeniy Plyusnin (Russian: Евгений Плюснин), in August 2004, as a former employee of the FSB Directorate for St. Petersburg and the Leningrad Region, became the head of the Gazprombank personnel department.)

Stanford International Bank was formed by Allen Stanford in 1986 in Montserrat where it was called Guardian International Bank. On 17 February 2009, the U.S. Securities and Exchange Commission charged Allen Stanford, Laura Pendergest-Holt and James Davis with fraud in connection with the bank's US$8 billion certificate of deposit (CD) investment scheme that offered "improbable and unsubstantiated high interest rates". This led the federal government to freeze the assets of the bank and other Stanford entities. On 27 February 2009, Pendergest-Holt was arrested by federal agents in connection with the alleged fraud. On that day, the SEC said that Stanford and his accomplices operated a "massive Ponzi scheme", misappropriated billions of investors' money and falsified the Stanford International Bank's records to hide their fraud. "Stanford International Bank's financial statements, including its investment income, are fictional," the SEC said.

Antigua Overseas Bank (AOB) was part of the ABI Financial Group and was a licensed bank in Antigua. On 13 April 2012, AOB was placed into receivership by the government of Antigua.

On 27 November 2018, Scotiabank, the leading commercial bank on the island, announced plans to sell its banking operations in Antigua and 9 other non-core Caribbean markets to Republic Financial Holdings Limited.

== Sport ==
The major Antiguan sport is cricket. Vivian ("Viv") Richards is one of the most famous Antiguans, who played for, and captained, the West Indies cricket team. Richards scored the fastest Test century at the Antigua Recreation Ground. What's more Brian Lara twice broke the world record for an individual Test innings at the ARG, scoring 375 in 1993/94 and 400 not out in 2003/04. The ARG was replaced by a new cricketing arena, dubbed the Sir Vivian Richards Stadium, constructed in time for the 2007 Cricket World Cup. Both football (soccer) and basketball are becoming popular among the island youth. There are several golf courses in Antigua. Daniel Bailey was the first athlete to win a global world medal at the 2010 IAAF World Indoor Championships.

Being surrounded by water, sailing is one of the most popular sports with Antigua Sailing Week and Antigua Classic Yacht Regatta being two of the region's most reputable sailing competitions. Hundreds of yachts from around the world compete around Antigua each year. Sport fishing is also a very popular sport with several big competitions held yearly. Windsurfing was very popular until kite-surfing came to the island. Kitesurfing or kite-boarding is very popular at Jabbawock Beach.

== Notable residents ==
- Curtly Ambrose, West-Indian cricketer
- Giorgio Armani, Italian fashion designer; owned a home near Deep Bay
- Calvin Ayre, billionaire founder of internet gambling company Bodog Entertainment Group
- Silvio Berlusconi, former Italian Prime Minister
- Richard Branson, Virgin Atlantic mogul
- Mehul Choksi, an Indian alleged scamster, diamond merchant and owner of Gitanjali Jewelers
- Eric Clapton, established an Antiguan drug treatment centre; has a home on the south of the island
- Melvin Claxton, Pulitzer Prize-winning journalist
- Timothy Dalton, actor of James Bond fame
- Heather Doram, artist, activist and educator, who designed the Antiguan and Barbudan national costume.
- Ken Follett, the author of Eye of the Needle, owns a house on Jumby Bay
- Marie-Elena John, Antiguan writer and former African Development Foundation specialist. Her debut novel, Unburnable, was selected Best Debut of 2006 by Black Issues Book Review
- S. D. Jones, professional wrestler known as "Special Delivery Jones" in the WWE in the 1970s and 1980s
- Phil Keoghan, host of The Amazing Race, lived here during part of his childhood
- Jamaica Kincaid, novelist famous for her writings about life on Antigua. Her 1988 book A Small Place was banned under the Vere Bird administration
- Robin Leach of Lifestyles of the Rich and Famous fame.
- Archibald MacLeish, poet and (U.S.) Librarian of Congress.
- Rachel Lambert Mellon, horticulturist and philanthropist, has owned a compound in Antigua's Half Moon Bay since the 1950s.
- Fred Olsen (1891–1986), inventor of the ball propellant manufacturing process
- Mary Prince, abolitionist and autobiographer, who wrote The History of Mary Prince (1831), the first account of the life of a Black woman to be published in the United Kingdom.
- Viv Richards, West Indian cricket legend; the Sir Vivian Richards Stadium in Antigua was named in his honour
- Richie Richardson, former West-Indies cricket team captain
- Andy Roberts, the first Antiguan to play Test cricket for the West Indies. He was a member of the West Indies teams that won the 1975 and 1979 World Cups.
- Sheila Roseau, women´s rights advocate
- Andriy Mykolayovych Shevchenko, former Ukrainian footballer and politician.
- Peter Stringfellow, British nightclub owner
- Thomas J. Watson Jr., CEO of IBM
- Oprah Winfrey, talk-show host

== See also ==
- Barbuda Land Acts
- Bibliography of Antigua and Barbuda
- Chief Justices
- Geology of Antigua and Barbuda
- Guns for Antigua
- Index of Antigua and Barbuda-related articles
- List of Antiguans and Barbudans
- Outline of Antigua and Barbuda
