= Studiation Brown =

James "Studiation" Brown was an Antiguan business man and political activist who played a leadership role in the labour unrest in Antigua in 1918.

Sometime following the start of the First World War, Studiation Brown, and his elder brother Robert, returned to Antigua from New York City, where they had become wealthy men. They invested in a new retail business, which they called the Bargain House. When Arlington Newton visited in Antigua in April 1916, he met with the Brown brothers before being deported. However they were able to agree on the foundation of the Ulotrichian Universal Union, which was registered as a friendly society by Newton in Barbados on 30 January 1917, and in Antigua on 2 April 1917. Studiation Brown became Marshal, while his brother was president.
