= Unburnable =

2006 novel by Marie-Elena John

- Author: Marie-Elena John
- Publisher: HarperCollins
- Publication date: 2006
- Publication place: United States

Unburnable is a 2006 novel written by Antiguan author Marie-Elena John and published by HarperCollins/Amistad. It is John's debut novel. Part historical fiction, murder mystery, and neo-slave narrative, Unburnable is a multi-generational saga that follows the African Diaspora in the United States and the Caribbean, offering a reinterpretation of black history. John was an Africa Development specialist in New York City and Washington, D.C., prior to turning to writing. Since publication of Unburnable, she has worked with the United Nations, currently serving as Senior Racial Justice Lead at UN Women.

== Plot introduction ==
The narrative of family, betrayal, vengeance, and murder follows a fictional character named Lillian Baptiste as she is willed back to her island home of Dominica from Washington, D.C., to finally settle her past. Haunted by scandal and secrets, Baptiste had fled Dominica when she was fourteen after discovering she was the daughter of Iris, the half-crazy woman whose life was told of in chanté mas songs sung during Carnival: songs about a village on a mountaintop littered with secrets, masks that supposedly fly and wreak havoc, and a man who suddenly and mysteriously dropped dead. After twenty years away, Lillian returns to her island of birth to face the demons of her past.

== Themes ==
Set in both contemporary Washington, D.C., and Dominica, and switching back and forth between contemporary and historical stories, Unburnable weaves together the black experience with Caribbean culture and history. Among the themes in the novel are the Caribs (the Kalinago), the Maroons, the history of Carnival and masquerade, the practice of Obeah, the fusion of African religions and Catholicism, resistance to slavery and post-colonial issues.

== Reviews ==
The novel has received favourable book reviews in the United States and the Caribbean. Essence Magazine's book editor, Patrick Bass, selected Unburnable as one of three "Patrick's Pick's", commenting that "Unburnable marks the arrival of a major new voice in fiction." In Black Issues Book Review, Denise M. Doig called the novel's author "superb". Dalia King of The Trinidad Guardian in her review of the novel commented, "John weaves the weighty issues of race, sex and politics into the fabric of a historical Dominica without allowing the essential story of 'Unburnable'—that of a woman searching for her past so that she may find herself—to get lost in the novel’s own self-importance".

== Editions ==
- 2006, USA, Amistad / HarperCollins (ISBN 0060837578), Pub date 11 April 2006, hardback (first edition)
- 2007, USA, Amistad / HarperCollins (ISBN 0060837586), Pub date 1 May 2006, paperback
