= Ulotrichian Universal Union =

African society for woolen haired

The Ulotrichian Universal Union was an African Caribbean friendly society founded in 1916. Ulotrichious refers to people with Wooly hair.

The UUU was founded by Arlington Newton in Barbados. By 1917, Studiation and Robert Brown had established a branch in Antigua.
