= Dwight Cuthbert Revire Gardiner =

Antiguan administrator

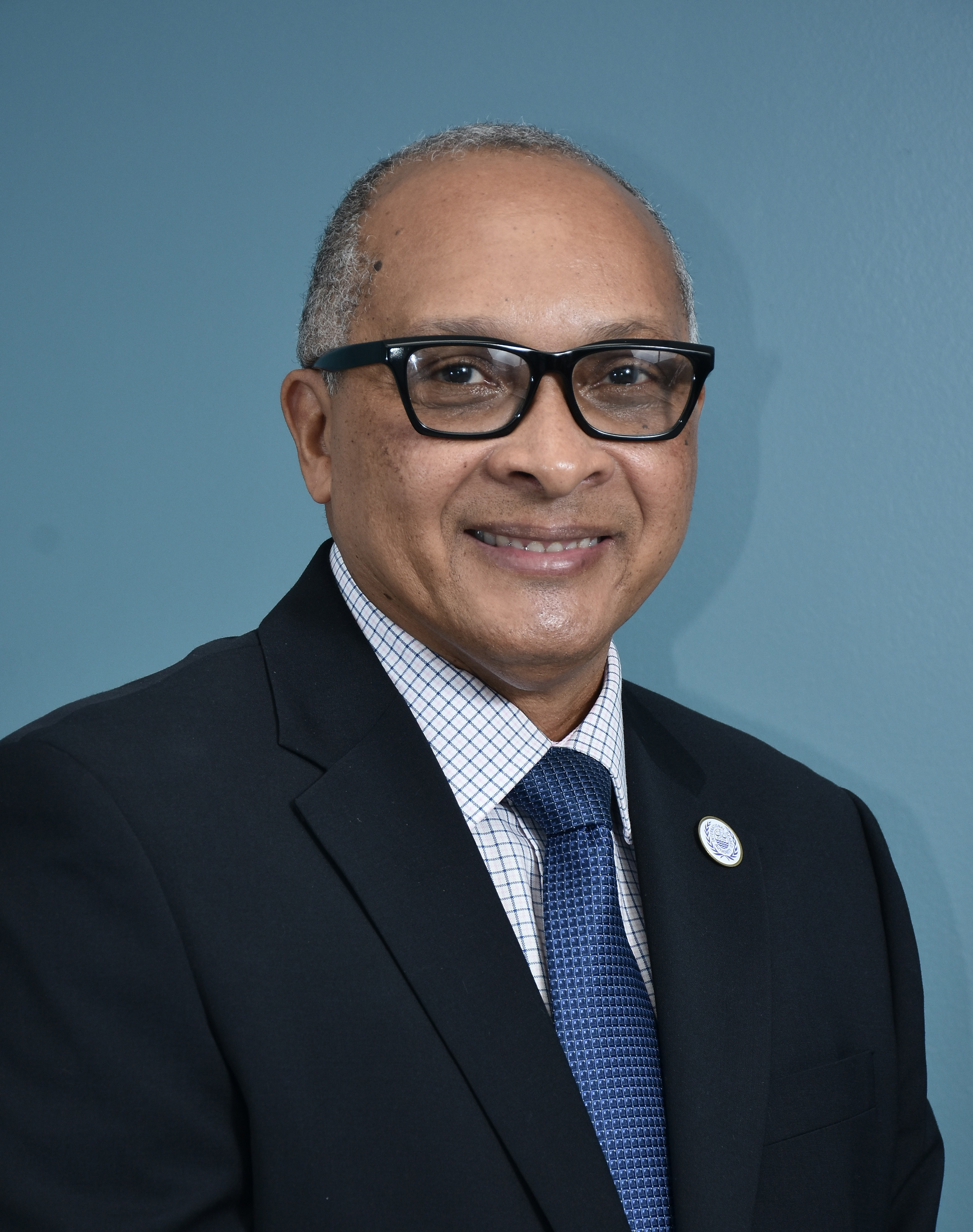
- Ambassador Gardiner in 2025
- Born: Parham Town, Saint Peter, Antigua
- Occupations: Maritime administrator, attorney-at-law, diplomat
- Known for: Director and Registrar General of ADOMS

Dwight Cuthbert Revire Gardiner is an Antiguan administrator, lawyer, and diplomat. He serves as the Director and Registrar General of the Antigua and Barbuda Department of Marine Services and Merchant Shipping (ADOMS) and as Antigua and Barbuda's Permanent Representative to the International Maritime Organization (IMO) and the International Seabed Authority (ISA).
