= Zahra Airall =

Antiguan writer

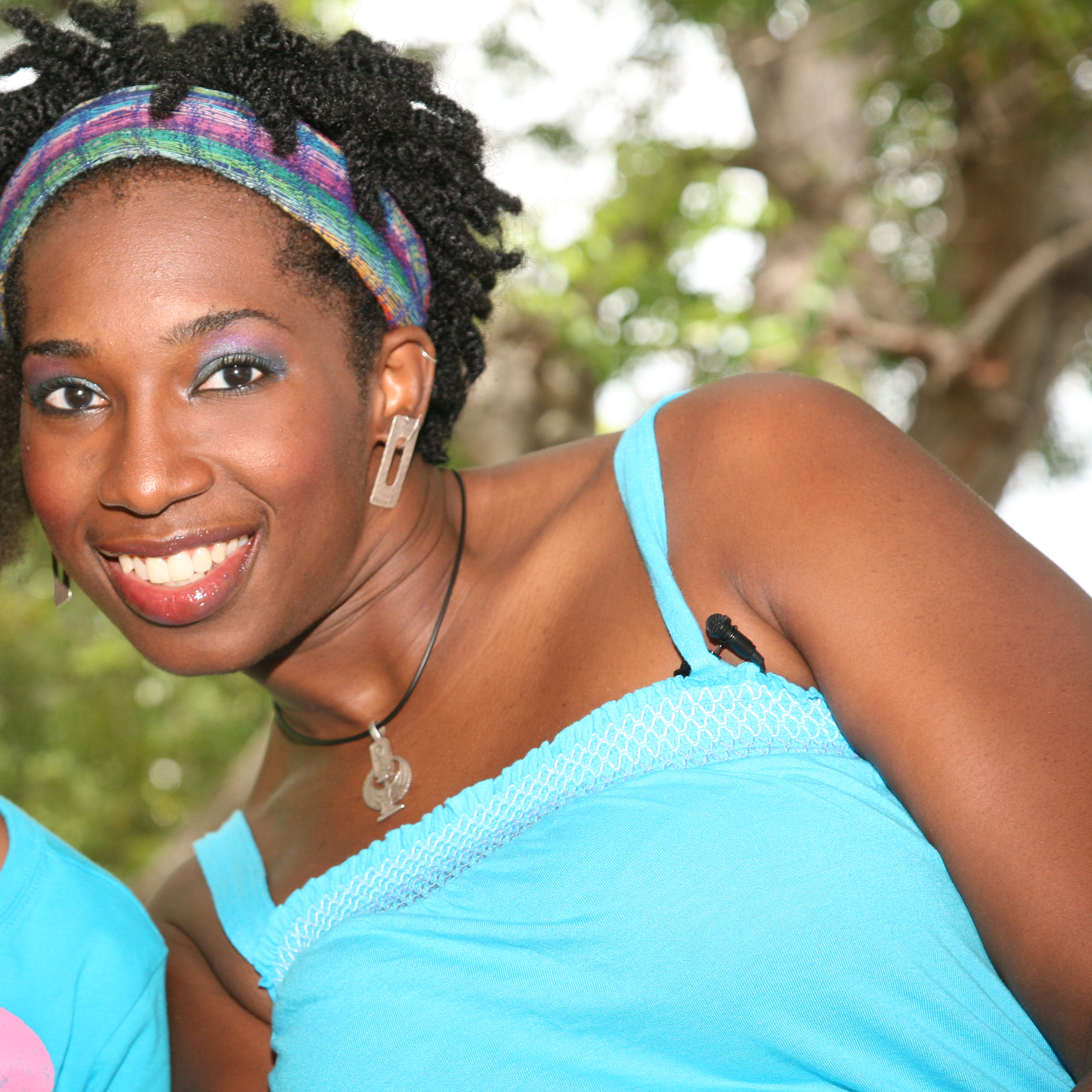
- Airall posing after community event Sports Day
- Born: Antigua
- Occupations: Women's rights activist, filmmaker, playwright

Zahra Airall is a writer, women's rights activist, film maker. director, and playwright from Antigua and Barbuda. She is a founding member of the organization Women of Antigua and is one of their executives. She is the director of the Sugar Apple Theatre in Antigua. Plays she has written include The Forgotten, which was performed in the Caribbean Secondary Schools Drama Festival by Antigua Girls' High School. Airall is one of the contributors to She Sex, a collaborative book with sections written by different Caribbean women. She also writes short stories such as "The Looking Glass". She wrote a specially commissioned monologue for Heather Doram.

== Awards ==
Airall has won multiple awards at the National Youth Awards (Antigua), including the award for literary arts in 2016 for her involvement in many things over the years including works within the organization Women of Antigua (When a Woman Moans, Vagina Monologues) and August Rush (Expressions). She has produced and scripted for the stage as well as film/TV content and steps on stage in numerous productions and in front of the camera (on Keeping it Real).
