= List of ambassadors of Antigua and Barbuda to China =

Coordinates: 39.950832°N 116.440010°E

The Antiguan Barbudan Ambassador to China is the official representative of the Government of Antigua and Barbuda to the Government of the People's Republic of China.

The embassy of Antigua and Barbuda is in Beijing.

designated/accredited	ambassador	Observations	Prime Minister of Antigua and Barbuda	Premier of the People's Republic of China	Term end
January 1, 1983	Lioydston Jacobs	The Permanent Representative of China to the United Nations Ling Qing and Lioydston Jacobs, initiated diplomatic relations of the two governments.	Vere Cornwall Bird	Zhao Ziyang	
2002	James Alphaeus Emanuel Thomas	(* 1930 November 21, 2011) CMG, Economics graduate University of Oxford was director of the West Indies Oil Company. (Introduction: By letter dated August 22, 1974, AE Thomas James I, was appointed by the Honourable Gerald Watt, Minister of National Security, Legal Affairs and Labour to act as Sole Arbitrator in respect of an outstanding dispute Reef Between Casion Ltd., and sundry Workers Represented by the Antigua Trades & Labour Union.): From 1987 to 1994 he was High Commissioner in London, (James Thomas, a director of the West Indies Oil Company, has been nominated as High Commissioner to the United Kingdom, replacing Ron Sanders, who resigned with effect from the end of April.); Representative to Association of Caribbean States, Caribbean Community and ambassador to Caracas.	Lester Bird	Zhu Rongji	2003
June 28, 2006	David Shoul		Baldwin Spencer	Wen Jiabao	2014
September 30, 2014	Brian Stuart-Young	( * en Guyana) resident in Antigua since 1978 was CEO of the Global Bank of Commerce Ltd.,	Gaston Browne	Wen Jiabao	
