= Heather Doram =

Artist from Antigua and Barbuda

- Born: Antigua and Barbuda
- Citizenship: Antiguan
- Education: University of the West Indies; Edna Manley College of the Visual and Performing Arts; Savannah College of Art and Design
- Occupations: Artist, educator, activist, actor
- Known for: Designing the national costume of Antigua and Barbuda

Heather Doram is an Antiguan artist, actor, activist and educator, who is the designer of Antigua and Barbuda's national costume. In 2002 she was awarded the Grand Cross of the Most Illustrious Order of Merit in recognition of her lifetime achievements.

== Biography ==
Born in Antigua to a seamstress mother and a father who worked in sugar industries, Doram's family lived on a number of sugar estates due to her father's work. She attended Antigua Girls' High School in St John's and subsequently studied for an Associate Degree in Education from the University of the West Indies. She returned to teach at her former school and a few years later was awarded funding to study for a BFA in Textiles at the Edna Manley College of the Visual and Performing Arts in Kingston.

In 1994, Doram received a scholarship that enabled her to study for an MA degree at Savannah College of Art and Design (SCAD), where her work was chosen to represent the university at the Venice Biennale. After her graduation, SCAD also purchased the majority of her thesis portfolio for its permanent collection.

On her return to Antigua, she worked for the Ministry of Education, advising them on arts curricula, and in 2003 was appointed Director of Culture. Her works include a mural at V.C. Bird International Airport, as well as collages and woven wall-hangings. She designed award-winning carnival costumes designed with her husband Connie Doram. In 2020 she called for revisions to be made to the Antigua Carnival costume judging criteria, in order to include and acknowledge the significance of new styles of mas (masquerade costumes). She retired in 2006.

In addition to her work as an artist and educator, Doram also has a successful acting career, which began in the 1990s. She has appeared in film, television and stage roles that include: The Vagina Monologues, The Sweetest Mango, and a monologue by Zahra Airall.

== National costume ==
In 1992, a competition was held to design a national dress for Antigua & Barbuda, and it was won by Doram. The costume she designed is based on what women who worked as market vendors or bakers might have worn in 1834. The costume for women includes a dress made from a "madras plaid of red, gold and green", which is then covered with a white pinafore, and headscarf. The plaid was first designed in 1992 and formally adopted in 1994. Men's costume includes a waistcoat in the same plaid, as well as a white shirt, black trousers and a straw hat. A sample of the material is held at the Scottish Register of Tartans. Since its inception, the national dress has been reinterpreted by many designers, and in 2012 the first National Dress Day was held on 26 October.

== Reception ==
Due to her focus on the heritage of Antigua and Barbuda in her work, Paget Henry has described Doram as a "nationalist" artist.

== Awards ==
- Grand Cross of the Most Illustrious Order of Merit (2002)
- Woman of Wadadli Award for Culinary Arts (2020)
