= Melvin Claxton =

American journalist and author

- Born: 1958 (age 67–68); Antigua
- Education: University of the Virgin Islands
- Years active: 1982–present
- Known for: Pulitzer Prize for Public Service (Winner, 1995; Finalist, 2003)

Melvin L. Claxton (born 1958) is an American journalist, author, and entrepreneur. He has written about crime, corruption, and the abuse of political power. He is best known for his 1995 series of investigative reports on corruption in the criminal justice system in the U.S. Virgin Islands and its links to the region's crime rate. His series earned the Virgin Islands Daily News the Pulitzer Prize for Public Service in 1995. Another series by Claxton, this time on the criminal justice system in Detroit, was a finalist for a Pulitzer Prize for Public Service in 2003. Claxton has won a number of national reporting awards and his work has been honored several times by the Associated Press managing editors. He is the founder and CEO of Epic 4D, an educational video game company.

== Career ==
Claxton began his journalism career at The Virgin Islands Daily News as an intern in 1983 while majoring in economics and journalism at the University of the Virgin Islands. Two years later, he became the newspaper's seventh full-time reporter. He went on to hold senior investigative reporting positions at The Chicago Tribune, The Detroit News, and The Tennessean. He featured in a segment of Prime Time, the popular ABC-TV news magazine show.

=== The "Virgin Islands Crime: Who's to Blame?" series ===
In December 1994, Claxton wrote a series of reports for The Virgin Islands Daily News. The reports resulted in a series titled "Virgin Island Crime: Who's to Blame?" and identified numerous issues: criminals getting guns easily, law-enforcement corruption and incompetence, inept criminal prosecutions, judges handing out light sentences and a flawed probation system. The reports revealed the extent of criminal infiltration into the territory of the criminal justice system. The publication of the series had a significant impact on the whole judicial system of the islands that a new police commissioner and attorney general were appointed and a narcotics official resigned. In 1995, the series was awarded the Pulitzer Prize for Public Service. The Pulitzer committee stated: "Awarded to The Virgin Islands Daily News, St. Thomas, for its disclosure of the links between the region's rampant crime rate and corruption in the local criminal justice system. The reporting, largely the work of Melvin Claxton, initiated political reforms."

=== Career timeline ===
- 2013–present: CEO Epic 4D LLC
- 2010–2013: Senior managing partner, Premier 3D Animation
- 2005–2007: Senior investigative reporter, The Tennessean
- 1998–2005: Senior investigative reporter, The Detroit News
- 1997–1998: Investigative reporter, Chicago Tribune Media Group
- 1994–1997: Reporter, Virgin Islands Daily News, St. Croix, Virgin Islands.

== Publications ==
=== Books ===
- Uncommon Valor: A Story of Race, Patriotism, and Glory in the Final Battles of the Civil War (2006). Melvin Claxton and Mark Puls. Wiley publishers, ISBN 0471468231.
- The Book Of Love. (2009). Melvin Claxton, Ira Claxton. BookSurge, ISBN 9781439219904.

=== Notable articles ===
- "Public Housing/Public Shame" (1983). Melvin Claxton. Virgin Islands Daily News.
- "Virgin Islands crime: who's to blame?" (1995). Melvin Claxton. Virgin Islands Daily News
- "Fire Sale: America’s unchecked gun market" (December 1997). Melvin Claxton and William Gaines. Chicago Tribune.
- "The government bought or manufactured millions of firearms..." (December 1997). William Gaines and Melvin Claxton.
- "Detroit Fire Department: Out of Service" (2000). Melvin Claxton and Charles Hunt.
- "Hiding in Plain View" (2002). Melvin Claxton, Norman Sinclair and Ronald Hansen. Detroit News.
- "The Cost of Murder" (2006). Tennessean, Nashville, TN.
- "Sexual abuse behind bars" (February 2008).

== Awards and recognition ==
- Pulitzer Prize for Public Service (1995)
- Robert F. Kennedy Journalism Award for print journalism (1997)
- Associated Press Managing Editors Public Service Award
- Michigan Associated Press awards (best overall story, best public service effort) 2000
- Investigative Reporters and Editors Award
- Benjamin Fine Award
- Al Nakula Award (1995)
- Scripps Howard Public Service Journalism award (Virgin Islands Daily News)
- Finalist for a Pulitzer Prize for Public Service in 2003
