= Geology of Antigua and Barbuda =

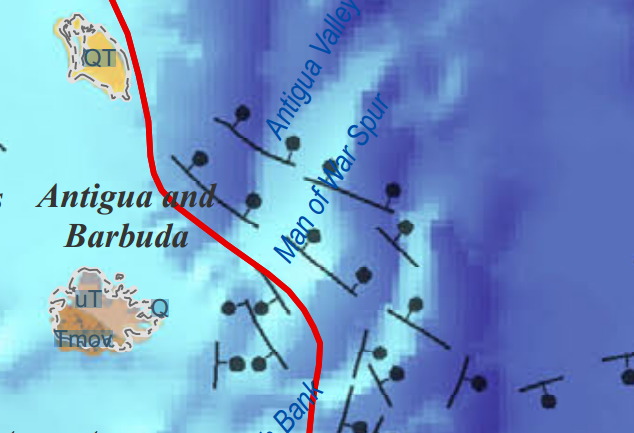
Geologic Map Antigua Barbuda

The geology of Antigua and Barbuda is part of the Lesser Antilles volcanic island arc. Both islands are the above water limestone "caps" of now inactive volcanoes. The two islands are the surface features of the undersea Barbuda Bank and have karst limestone landscapes. Barbuda is primarily flat and formed from coral reefs. The Middle Miocene Highlands Formation has limestones which are the oldest rocks on the island, rising 120 feet above sea level. The Beazer Formation and the Codrington Formation are both from the Pleistocene and include reef and lagoon related rocks.

The geologic record of Antigua indicates a transition from island arc volcanism to limestone deposition in the Late Oligocene. Hence the island is characterized by a Basal Volcanic Suite (BVS) on the mountainous southwest, a Central Plain Group (CPG) extending from St. Johns to the southeast, and the Antigua Formation on the northeast portion of the island in the direction of regional dip. The CPG consists of siliciclastic and limestone, marine and non-marine sedimentary rocks, containing petrified wood and gastropods within chert. The Antigua Formation includes benthic foraminifers and molluscs, scleractinian corals, echinoids, crabs, bryozoans, crinoid columns and sponges. The limestone Devil's Bridge, is an example of this formation.

On Antigua, the south of the island is mainly calc-alkaline volcanic rock such as dacite and quartz basalt or andesite, along with limestone lenses, agglomerate and tuff formed during the Oligocene. Generally andesite dominated volcanism across the island gave way to limestone and chert formation.

Between 200 and 500 CE, native peoples on Antigua were active in lapidary, working local diorite, shells and carnelian as well as imported nephrite, amethyst, turquoise and serpentinite.
