= Veronica Yearwood =

Antiguan choreographer and dance company founder

Veronica Yearwood is an Antiguan choreographer and dance company founder. She founded the Antigua Dance Academy (ADA), was a founding member of the Caribbean Folk Arts Association (CARIBFOLK) and is a member of the International Dance Council (CID).

== Career ==
In October 1991, Yearwood founded the Antigua Dance Academy (ADA). The ADA specialises in Caribbean folk dance and West African dance styles, Modern and Jazz. In May 2004, Yearwood founded the first Caribbean Folk Dance Festival.

Yearwood was an advisor to the Regional Dance Association from 2002 to 2005, was a founding member of the Caribbean Folk Arts Association (CARIBFOLK), based in Philadelphia, United States, and is a member of the International Dance Council (CID).

In 2018, Yearwood participated in the "Gombeys and Traditions of the Diaspora: A Symposium" as part of the Bermudian Heartbeats Lecture Series. In 2023, she choreographed the first Antiguan Bélé dance.

In March 2025, Yearwood was awarded a Women of Wadadli and Wa’Omoni Award (WOW) in the category of Fine Arts by the Caribbean Union Bank (CUB) and the Directorate of Gender Affairs (DoGA) within the Ministry of Social & Urban Transformation.
