= Sheila Roseau =

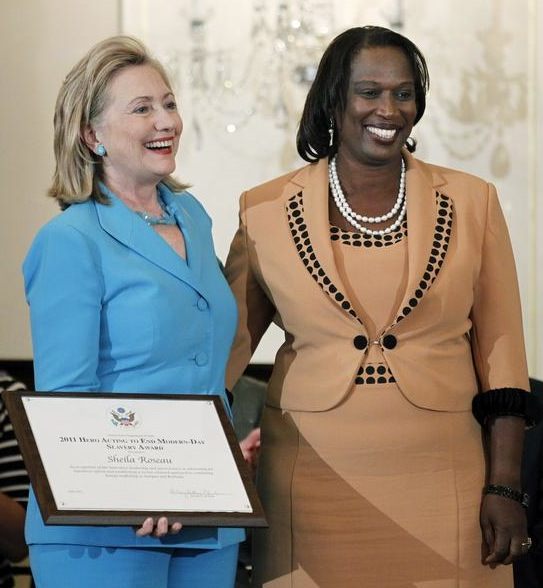
Sheila Roseau received the 2011 Hero Acting to End Modern Day Slavery Award by US Secretary of State Hillary Clinton at the State Department in Washington, D.C.

Sheila Roseau (born August 26, 1957), is the current United Nations Population Fund (UNFPA) Namibia Country Representative since 2020, continuing from her role as Deputy Regional Director of the Regional Office Panama for Latin America and the Caribbean of the United Nations Population Fund (UNFPA). She joined the UNFPA in 2013 as the Director and Representative of the Sub-Regional Office for the English and Dutch speaking Caribbean of the United Nations Population Fund (UNFPA), previously serving as the Executive Director of Gender Affairs for Antigua and Barbuda and is a longtime advocate of women's rights.

== Early life and career ==
Born and raised in Cedar Grove, Antigua, Roseau attended The Antigua Girls High School. She started her professional career in 1981 with the Ealing Health Authority becoming a Registered Nurse. In 1991 she obtained a Certificate in Management Studies with the University of Westminster (Polytechnic of Central London) in the United Kingdom. She then went on to complete a Bachelor of Arts (Hons), Social Science & Social Policy with the Middlesex University. She holds a Master of Business Administration, Public Sector Management with the University of the West Indies, Barbados.

Roseau's was the Executive Director of Gender Affairs for Antigua and Barbuda for 18 years. In January 2008 Roseau organised the Take Back the Night event, bringing men and women together where an urgent public call for an effective state and community action was made, to support survivors of sexual assault and to raise awareness of sexual violence. The event was attended by well over 500 persons. She became the coordinator and a founding member of the Caribbean Institute of Women in Leadership (CIWIL) in 2009 through her work as Director of Gender Affairs and is still an active member to date.

In 2010, she played an active role in the passage of Antigua and Barbuda's first law that penalise criminal for human trafficking and provide vast protection for victims. After pushing the drafting of the legislation and petitioning for its passage, Ms. Roseau is a firm supporter of its ongoing implementation.

In November 2013 Roseau became the Director of the Sub-Regional Office for the English and Dutch speaking Caribbean of the United Nations Population Fund (UNFPA), and the Representative in Jamaica.

== Awards and honors ==
In 2009 Roseau received a National Award, Commander of the Most Illustrious Order of Merit (CM) given by the Governor General of Antigua and Barbuda, Dame Louise Lake Tac. Roseau received the Hero Acting to End Modern Day Slavery Award from US Secretary of State, Hillary Clinton, in 2011 for her work on the human trafficking legislation. She was also nominated for the Women of Courage Award.

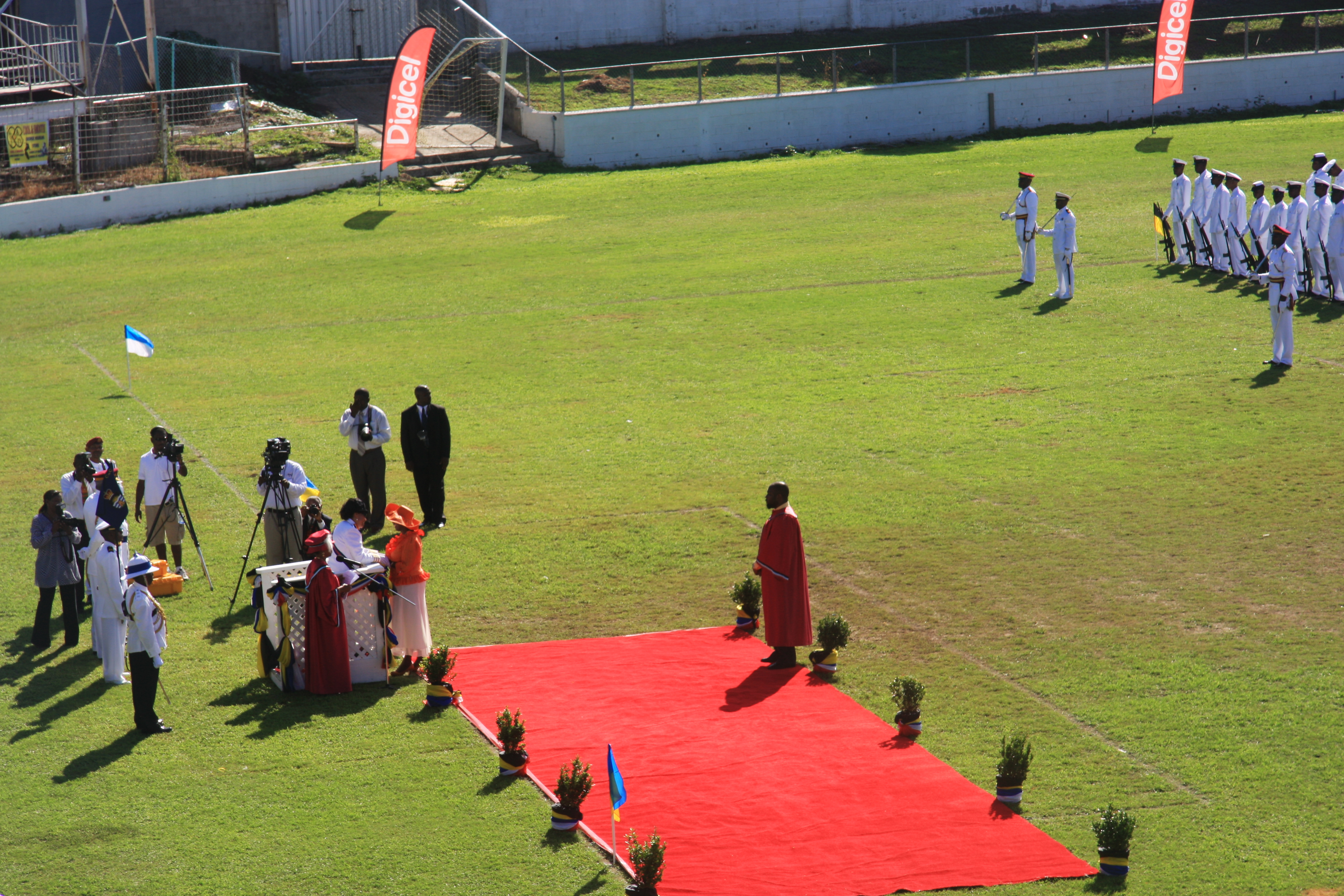
The 2009 National Award, Commander of the Most Illustrious Order of Merit (CM) ceremony.
