= Marie-Elena John =

Caribbean writer

Marie-Elena John is an Antiguan writer whose novel, Unburnable, was published in 2006. She is an Africanist, development and women's rights specialist, currently serving as the Senior Racial Justice Lead at UN Women.

== Biography ==
John was born and raised in Antigua. After writing, she continued her career in international development and human rights. She has worked for the last decade at UN Women, the agency of the United Nations mandated with advancing gender equality and the empowerment of women. She currently serves as the Senior Racial Justice Lead.

Earlier in her career, she was a development specialist, working at the African Development Foundation, the World Council of Churches' Program to Combat Racism, and Global Rights (formerly the International Human Rights Law Group), where she worked in support of the pro-democracy movement in Nigeria and in the Democratic Republic of Congo. She is known especially for her work in the United Nations and at local and national levels to raise awareness about the denial of inheritance rights to women.

Marie-Elena John made history in 1986 as the first Black woman valedictorian of New York's City College (CCNY). She later earned a Masters of International Affairs from Columbia University, specializing in culture and development in Africa.

John made her literary debut with Unburnable. Unburnable which moves back and forth between modern times and the past, is primarily a historical novel centred on the hanging of a family matriarch, and fuses Caribbean history, African heritage, and African-American sensibilities. Marie-Elena John parlays her knowledge of the African diaspora, including the United States and the Caribbean island of Dominica, into a work that shifts from modern to colonial and pre-colonial times, exploring the intersection of history, African mythology and African-Caribbean culture. Important themes include the African origins of Carnival and masquerades, African religion, the practice of Obeah, syncretic Catholicism, Caribbean folklore, the Maroons and resistance to slavery. In this respect, Unburnable is both a contemporary Caribbean novel as well as a neo-slave narrative. Unburnable also notably includes the original inhabitants of the Caribbean, the Kalinago (also called the Carib Indians). It has been compared to Jean Rhys' Wide Sargasso Sea and to Jamaica Kincaid's The Autobiography of My Mother.

== Awards and recognition ==
Unburnable, was named "Best Debut of 2006" by Black Issues Book Review, was short-listed for a 2007 Hurston/Wright Legacy Award in the Debut Fiction Category, was nominated for the 2008 International Dublin Literary Award. She was also selected by Book Expo America as one of ten "emerging voices" for 2006, chosen from among the debut novelists reviewed by Publishers Weekly for the 2005–06 period.
