= Ethnicity in Antigua and Barbuda =

Antigua and Barbuda is mostly of African descent, with Antiguans and Barbudans being classified into seven ethnic divisions as of the last census in 2011. In that census, 81,066 people declared their ethnicity, out of a total population of 86,295. In descending order, the largest ethnic groups are: Africans, other mixed, Hispanic, white, Indian (from the country of India), other, mixed (black/white), and Syrian/Lebanese. All inhabited parishes and dependencies in the country are majority-African.

== History ==
During the Ceramic period from 500 BC–1500 AD, Antigua and Barbuda was primarily inhabited by the Arawak. This is the earliest time period in the country's history that a majority ethnic group has been able to be determined. After the introduction of slaves in the 1600s, for much of the height of slavery in the country, the Antiguan legislature adopted various programs to increase the amount of white settlers through indentured servants. Barbuda was not a settler colony, and thus never tried to implement any of these programs. In 1800, the black population was about 30,000, the white about 1,980, and the mixed about 4,000. Racial discrimination was prevalent, and it was not until 1790 that black people could serve in minor military roles. Emancipation of black slaves occurred in 1833. After this, many small black villages were established outside of the white-controlled towns.

Since independence, black people have made up the majority of the country's middle class, while Syrians, Lebanese people, and white people comprise most of the upper class. Recent immigrants, Indians, and especially Hispanic people make up the lower class. Urban areas are usually lower-income than rural areas, rural areas being mostly inhabited by African descendants.

== Ethnic groups by population ==
Ethnic group (2011)	Population	%
African	74,018	87.27%
Other mixed	3,225	3.80%
Hispanic	2,330	2.75%
White	1,398	1.65%
Indian (India)	942	1.11%
Other ethnicity	797	0.94%
Mixed black/white	786	0.93%
Don't know/not stated	750	0.88%
Syrian/Lebanese	570	0.67%

== Country of birth groups by ethnicity ==
Country of birth (2011)	Ethnic group								
Country of birth (2011)	African descendent	Caucasian/White	East Indian/India	Mixed (Black/White)	Mixed (Other)	Hispanic	Syrian/Lebanese	Other	Don't know/Not stated
Africa	80.45%	13.00%	0.37%	0.36%	2.90%		0.37%	2.20%	0.36%
Other Latin or North American countries	29.99%	11.85%	4.51%	2.59%	15.06%	31.33%	2.65%	1.31%	0.71%
Antigua and Barbuda	94.11%	0.31%	0.21%	0.77%	2.74%	0.64%	0.31%	0.42%	0.49%
Other Caribbean countries	67.65%	3.37%	0.42%	2.10%	10.08%	13.27%	1.28%	1.40%	0.42%
Canada	47.21%	28.41%	4.88%	4.28%	12.12%			3.09%	
Other Asian countries	3.61%	5.83%	35.61%		1.42%		7.28%	46.24%	
Other European countries	7.53%	77.84%	1.76%	2.80%	2.12%	0.35%		6.16%	1.43%
Dominica	88.81%	0.09%	0.15%	1.01%	5.89%	0.97%	0.03%	2.67%	0.38%
Dominican Republic	11.84%	0.36%	0.15%	1.21%	3.24%	81.89%	0.05%	0.84%	0.41%
Guyana	78.99%	0.18%	7.58%	1.17%	9.99%	0.03%	0.02%	1.58%	0.45%
Jamaica	94.28%	0.18%	0.43%	0.59%	3.62%	0.02%		0.27%	0.62%
Monsterrat	97.95%	0.52%		0.34%	0.85%			0.17%	0.17%
St. Kitts and Nevis	91.45%	1.19%		2.10%	4.09%	0.29%	0.30%		0.58%
St. Lucia	89.51%	0.35%	1.44%	1.60%	5.99%	0.18%		0.57%	0.35%
St. Vincent and the Grenadines	92.06%	0.17%	0.65%	0.95%	5.05%			0.96%	0.17%
Syria		0.37%	0.37%		0.37%		96.74%	1.78%	0.37%
Trinidad and Tobago	53.85%	4.78%	8.94%	3.01%	24.18%		2.86%	2.16%	0.21%
United Kingdom	39.06%	48.69%	0.39%	5.01%	6.06%			0.52%	0.26%
USA	76.90%	10.18%	2.86%	1.25%	4.46%	0.84%	1.05%	1.97%	0.49%
USVI United States Virgin Islands	96.37%			2.04%	1.32%			0.27%	
Not Stated	60.98%	2.52%	1.78%	0.90%	2.88%	2.46%	0.65%	1.46%	26.38%

== By age ==
Ethnic (2011)	Broad age groups																	
Ethnic (2011)	0-4	5-9	10-14	15-19	20-24	25-29	30-34	35-39	40-44	45-49	50-54	55-59	60-64	65-69	70-74	75-79	80+	Total
African descendent	5,733	5,651	6,502	6,331	5,622	5,628	5,659	5,773	5,772	5,317	4,462	3,200	2,567	1,971	1,330	1,051	1,450	74,018
Caucasian/White	63	64	56	31	82	76	75	92	99	132	132	142	141	88	53	39	32	1,398
East Indian/India	46	53	57	62	155	121	99	84	78	74	46	23	21	10	6	4	2	942
Mixed (Black/White)	65	71	85	74	55	40	43	56	56	61	50	39	18	21	14	15	23	786
Mixed (Other)	378	329	358	327	233	202	229	220	215	207	142	104	86	72	45	36	41	3,225
Hispanic	162	149	124	109	140	207	280	283	275	249	161	103	55	19	6	3	3	2,330
Syrian/Lebanese	56	35	38	18	23	75	67	63	48	50	22	20	18	11	11	5	10	570
Other	46	39	36	42	96	95	68	73	64	78	49	36	21	15	14	8	17	797
Don't know/Not stated	71	65	68	62	83	63	48	42	55	38	26	24	37	23	11	10	25	750
Total	6,620	6,455	7,325	7,057	6,488	6,507	6,568	6,688	6,662	6,206	5,090	3,690	2,964	2,231	1,491	1,171	1,603	84,816

== Maps ==
Distribution of Afro-Antiguans and Barbudans, 2011

Distribution of Hispanic Antiguans and Barbudans, 2011

Distribution of Indian Antiguans and Barbudans, 2011

Distribution of mixed black and white Antiguans and Barbudans, 2011

Distribution of other mixed Antiguans and Barbudans, 2011

Distribution of no stated ethnicity, 2011

Distribution of Syrian or Lebanese Antiguans and Barbudans, 2011

Distribution of White Antiguans and Barbudans, 2011

Distribution of other Antiguans and Barbudans, 2011

Largest ethnic groups in Antigua and Barbuda apart from Africans and mixed people, 2011

== See also ==
- Demographics of Antigua and Barbuda
- Youth in Antigua and Barbuda
- Culture of Antigua and Barbuda
- Barbudans
