= List of settlements in Antigua and Barbuda by population =

This is a list of all settlements in Antigua and Barbuda with over 700 people.

A settlement is the capital of a parish if its name appears bolded. It is italicized if the settlement is the largest city in the parish; if both, it is bolded and italicized.

== List ==
Name	Population (2011)	Parish/dependency	Reference
**St. John's**	24,451	Saint John	
All Saints	3,812	Saint John, Saint Peter, Saint Paul	
Bolans	2,053	Saint Mary	
Liberta	2,003	Saint Paul	
Piggotts	1,931	Saint George	
Swetes	1,720	Saint Paul	
Jennings	1,481	Saint Mary	
Clare Hall	1,459	Saint John	
Willikies	1,270	Saint Philip	
**Old Road**	1,251	Saint Mary	
Montclear	1,246	Saint John	
Skyline	1,212	Saint John	
Jacks Hill	1,151	Saint John	
Potters Village	1,116	Saint John	
**Parham**	1,084	Saint Peter	
Sugar Factory	1,051	Saint George	
Cedar Grove	934	Saint John	
St. Claire	898	Saint John	
Freemans	860	Saint Peter	
Tomlinson	808	Saint John	
Buckleys	801	Saint John	
**Codrington**	796	Barbuda	
Sea View Farm	792	Saint George	
Crosbies	788	Saint John	
Herberts	741	Saint John	
Urlings	738	Saint Mary	
Antigua and Barbuda			
