= Antigua and Barbuda =

Country in the Lesser Antilles

Antigua and Barbuda Aanteega an' Baabyuuda (Antiguan and Barbudan Creole) Antigua y Barbuda (Spanish)
- Flag Coat of arms
- Motto: "Each endeavouring, all achieving"
- Anthem: "Fair Antigua, We Salute Thee" (Note: "Fair Antigua, We Salute Thee" is the de facto national anthem of Antigua and Barbuda and is not codified in any legislation as of July 2025. Additionally, Antigua and Barbuda does not have a royal anthem.)
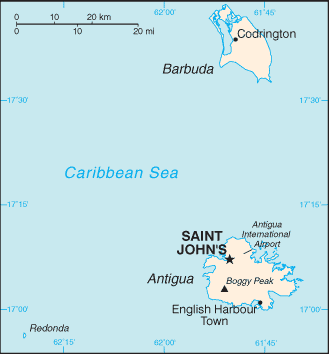
- Capital and largest city: St. John's (Note: St. John's is the administrative centre by convention and the city's status is not defined in the law. Most diplomatic missions are located in Marble Hill.); 17°7′N 61°51′W
- Official languages: English (Note: English is the official language by convention, and de jure has no official status. See Antiguan and Barbudan English for more information.); Spanish (Note: Cabinet designated Spanish as an official language on 14 May 2026. See Spanish language in Antigua and Barbuda for more details.)
- Vernacular language: Antiguan and Barbudan Creole
- Ethnic groups (2011): 87.3% African; 4.7% Multiracial; 2.8% Hispanic; 1.7% European; 1.1% East Indian; 0.7% Syrian or Lebanese; 1.8% other
- Religion (2025): 92.51% Christianity; 71.26% Protestantism; 22.1% other Christian; 3.72% Spiritism; 1.36% No religion; 1.1% Baháʼí Faith; 0.77% Islam; 0.44% Hinduism; 0.1% other
- Demonym: Antiguan and Barbudan
- Government: Unitary parliamentary constitutional monarchy
  - Monarch: Charles III
  - Governor-General: Rodney Williams
  - Prime Minister: Gaston Browne
- Legislature: Parliament
  - Upper house: Senate
  - Lower house: House of Representatives

Formation
  - Union: 1 August 1860
  - Redonda: 26 March 1872
  - Associated state: 27 February 1967
  - Independence: 1 November 1981

Area
  - Total: 440 km^{2} (170 sq mi) (182nd)
  - Water (%): negligible

Population
  - 2026 estimate: ▲106,365 (182nd)
  - 2011 census: ▲84,816
  - Density: 241/km^{2} (624.2/sq mi) (63rd)
- GDP (PPP): 2025 estimate
  - Total: ▲$3.3 billion (180th)
  - Per capita: ▲$31,781 (66th)
- GDP (nominal): 2025 estimate
  - Total: ▲$2.37 billion (171st)
  - Per capita: ▲$22,630 (51st)
- HDI (2023): ▲0.851 very high (53rd)
- Currency: Eastern Caribbean dollar (XCD)
- Time zone: UTC-04:00 (AST)
- Date format: dd/mm/yyyy
- Calling code: +1
- ISO 3166 code: AG
- Internet TLD: .ag

Antigua and Barbuda (Note: /ænˈtiːɡə ... bɑːrˈbjuːdə/; Antiguan and Barbudan Creole: Aanteega an' Baabyuuda [äːnˈtiːɡə (h)ä̃ bäːˈbjuːdə]; Spanish: Antigua y Barbuda [an̪ˈti.ɣ̞u.a i β̞aɾˈβ̞u.ða]) is an archipelagic country in the Caribbean composed of Antigua, Barbuda, and dozens of other small islands. Antigua and Barbuda has a total area of 440 km^{2} (170 sq mi), making it one of the smallest countries in the Caribbean. The country is mostly flat, with the highest points on Antigua being in the Shekerley Mountains and on Barbuda the Highlands. The country has a tropical savanna climate, with pockets of tropical monsoon in Antigua's southwest. Its most populated city is St. John's, followed by All Saints and Bolans. The sole settlement in Barbuda is Codrington. Most of the country resides in the Central Plain that stretches from St. John's to English Harbour.

Bounded by the Atlantic Ocean on the east and the Caribbean Sea on the west, Antigua and Barbuda is located within the Leeward Islands moist forest and Leeward Islands xeric scrub ecoregions. The country shares maritime borders with Anguilla, Saint Barthélemy, and Saint Kitts and Nevis to the west, Montserrat to the southwest, and Guadeloupe to the south. Antigua and Barbuda has numerous natural parks, including Codrington Lagoon, one of the largest internal bodies of water in the Lesser Antilles. Despite its dense population, the country has large swaths of undeveloped land, however, Antigua and Barbuda has experienced many environmental issues due to climate change.

Hunter-gatherers settled the islands starting around 3700 BC, likely arriving on canoes from Central and South America. They were followed by the Arawaks of Venezuela during the Ceramic period. In 1493, Christopher Columbus surveyed the island of Antigua, which resulted in an attempt at Spanish settlement in 1520. Antigua remained uncolonised until 1632 when Edward Warner and his small party created the first successful British colony. Barbuda was under the control of the Codrington family until the 1860s. Antiguan independence was first proposed by Prince Klaas in 1728, who attempted to make the island an independent kingdom. After emancipation in 1834, Antigua's autonomy slowly increased, while Barbuda was slowly integrated into Antigua. The first democratic elections were held in 1951, and by 1981, Antigua and Barbuda were independent. From 1960 until 2004, the Bird family dominated the archipelago's politics with only one interruption, which ended with the election of Baldwin Spencer to the premiership.

Since 2014, the Labour Party has dominated national politics. Antigua and Barbuda is a member of the Commonwealth and a Commonwealth realm, being a constitutional monarchy with Charles III as its head of state. The country is a unitary state, with Barbuda being administered by the Barbuda Council since 1976. Antigua is divided into six parishes. The central government is composed of three main branches: legislative, executive, and judicial. It has a bicameral national legislature comprising the directly elected House of Representatives and the Senate appointed by the Governor-General, the representative of the monarch. The Labour Party and the United Progressive Party have dominated the country's politics since 1994. The country has a proportionally high foreign-born population; most people are of African descent, with significant populations of Europeans, Hispanics, and Indians. The country is majority Christian, with most being Protestant. The most spoken home language in the country is Antiguan and Barbudan Creole. Compared to neighbouring countries, Antigua and Barbuda ranks highly in most economic indicators, and ranks about average in political freedoms.

Antigua and Barbuda is a high-income country and is the most developed country in the Caribbean by Human Development Index. It is a member of the United Nations, the OECS, the Regional Security System, CARICOM, and the World Trade Organisation. Antigua and Barbuda is one of the only countries in the Caribbean to maintain an air force, and has a mostly service-based economy. Antigua and Barbuda maintains significant influence in the former British Leeward Islands and the eastern Caribbean, having the largest economy and population in the former colony. However, the country continues to struggle with human rights and political polarisation, with declining freedom of the press and a significant Barbudan independence movement re-emerging due to tensions between the islands.

== Etymology ==
Antigua is Spanish for 'ancient' and barbuda is Spanish for 'bearded'. The island of Antigua was originally called Waladli by the Arawaks, and the Caribs possibly called Barbuda Wa'omoni. Christopher Columbus, while sailing by in 1493, may have named it Santa Maria la Antigua, after an icon in the Spanish Seville Cathedral. The "bearded" of Barbuda is thought to refer either to the male inhabitants of the island, or the bearded fig trees present there. The term Wadadli is a corrupted form of the original Arawak name, emerging from a misspelling in a popular 1970s song. The term is sometimes used in Antiguan and Barbudan Creole to refer to the island's original name. Aanteega an' Baabyuuda is the Creole endonym for the country, deriving from the English name.

== History ==
=== Pre-colonial period ===
Archaic-period hunter-gatherers called the Ciboney were the first culture present in Antigua and Barbuda. Carbon dating has established the earliest settlements started around 3700 BC. They were succeeded by the ceramic age pre-Columbian Arawak-speaking Saladoid people who migrated from the lower Orinoco River. They introduced agriculture, raising, among other crops, the Antigua black pineapple (Ananas comosus), corn, sweet potatoes, chillies, guava, tobacco, and cotton. Later on the Caribs settled the island.

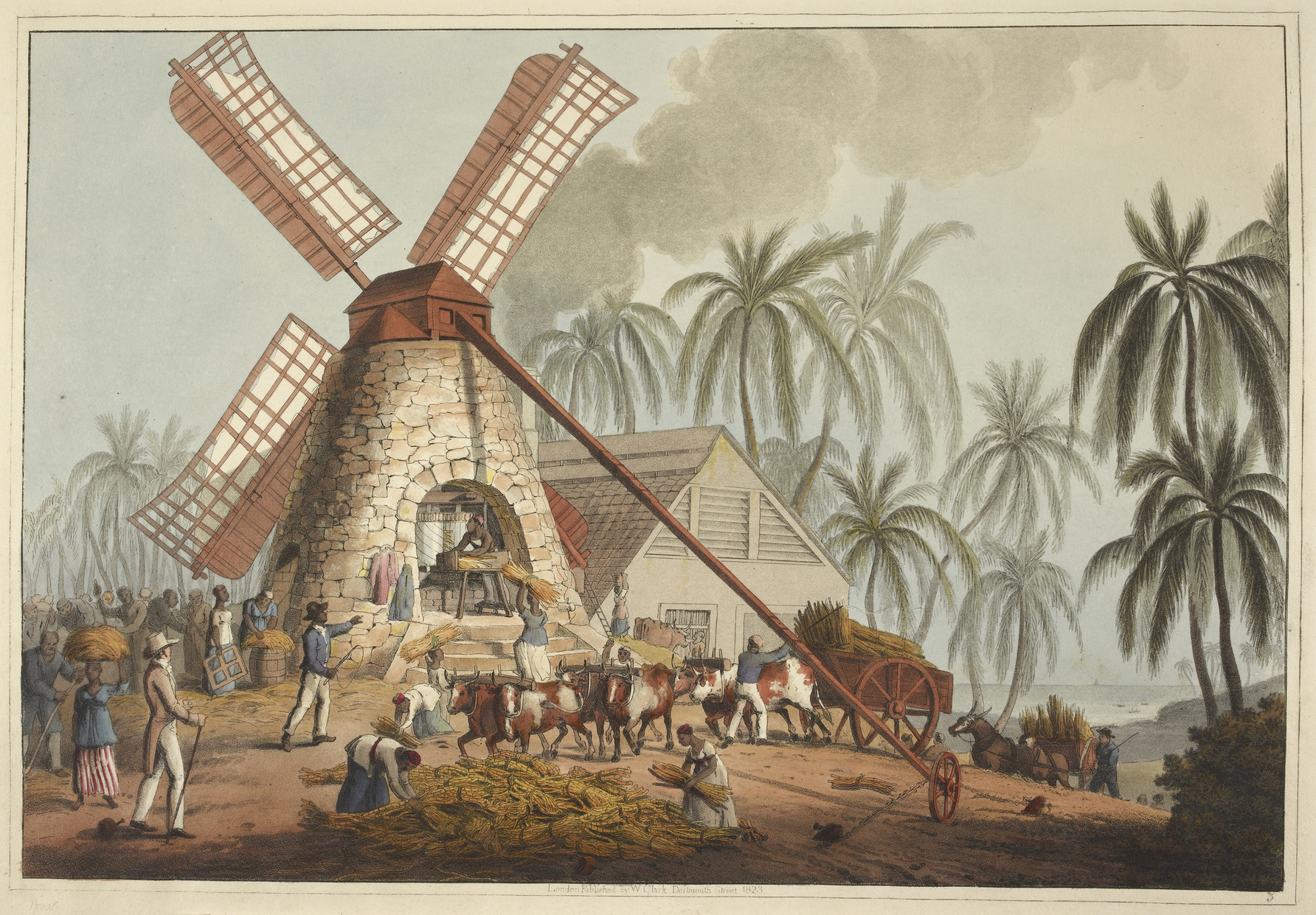
Antigua in 1823

=== European rule and slavery ===
Christopher Columbus was the first European to sight the islands in 1493. The Spanish did not colonise Antigua until after a combination of European and African diseases, malnutrition, and slavery eventually extirpated most of the Native population; smallpox was probably the greatest killer.

The English settled on Antigua in 1632; Christopher Codrington settled on Barbuda in 1685. Tobacco and then sugar were grown, worked by a large population of slaves transported from West Africa, who soon came to vastly outnumber the European settlers.

The English maintained control of the islands, repulsing an attempted French attack in 1666. The brutal conditions endured by the slaves led to revolts in 1701 and 1729 and a planned revolt in 1736, the last led by Prince Klaas, though it was discovered before it began and the ringleaders were executed. Slavery was abolished in the British Empire in 1833, affecting the economy. This was exacerbated by natural disasters such as the 1843 earthquake and the 1847 hurricane. Mining occurred on the isle of Redonda, however, this ceased in 1929 and the island has since remained uninhabited.

Part of the Leeward Islands colony, Antigua and Barbuda became part of the short-lived West Indies Federation from 1958 to 1962. Antigua and Barbuda subsequently became an associated state of the United Kingdom with full internal autonomy on 27 February 1967. The 1970s were dominated by discussions as to the islands' future and the rivalry between Vere Bird of the Antigua and Barbuda Labour Party (ABLP) (Premier from 1967 to 1971 and 1976 to 1981) and the Progressive Labour Movement (PLM) of George Walter (Premier 1971–1976). Eventually, Antigua and Barbuda gained full independence on 1 November 1981; Vere Bird became prime minister of the new country. The country opted to remain within the Commonwealth, retaining Elizabeth II (r. 1952–2022) as head of state, with the first governor, Sir Wilfred Jacobs, as governor-general. Succeeding Wilfred Jacobs were James Carlisle (1993–2007), Louise Lake-Tack (2007–2014), and the present since 2014 being Rodney Williams.

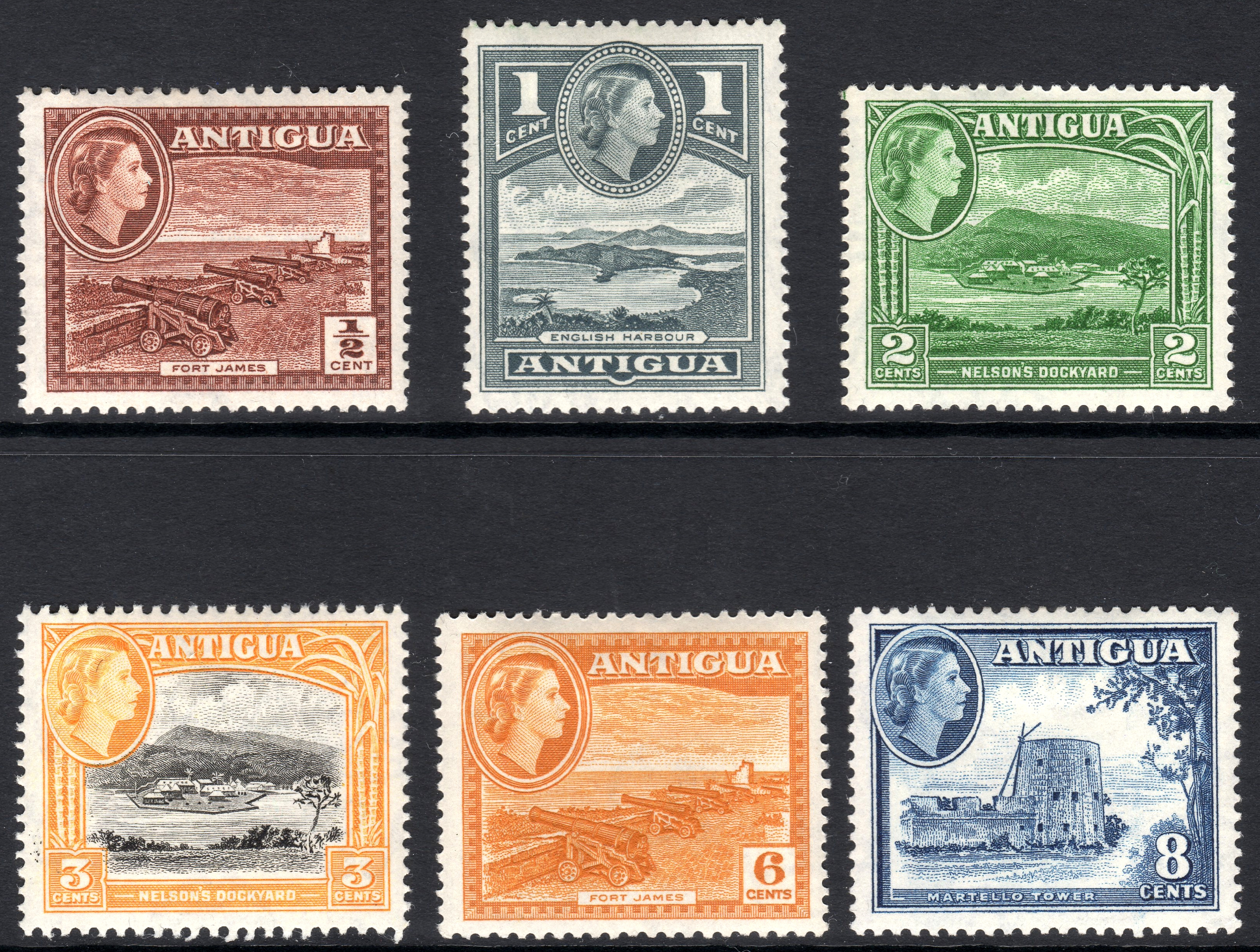
Queen Elizabeth II on 1953 Antiguan stamps

=== Independence era ===
The first two decades of Antigua's independence were dominated politically by the Bird family and the ABLP, with Vere Bird ruling from 1981 to 1994, followed by his son Lester Bird from 1994 to 2004. Though providing a degree of political stability, and boosting tourism to the country, the Bird governments were frequently accused of corruption, cronyism and financial malfeasance. Vere Bird Jr., the elder son, was forced to leave the cabinet in 1990 following a scandal in which he was accused of smuggling Israeli weapons to Colombian drug-traffickers. Another son, Ivor Bird, was convicted of possessing cocaine in 1995. Also in 1995, Hurricane Luis caused severe damage on Barbuda.

The ABLP's dominance of Antiguan politics ended with the 2004 Antiguan general election, which was won by Baldwin Spencer's United Progressive Party (UPP). Winston Baldwin Spencer was Prime Minister of Antigua and Barbuda from 2004 to 2014. However, the UPP lost the 2014 Antiguan general election, with the ABLP returning to power under Gaston Browne. ABLP won 15 of the 17 seats in the 2018 snap election under the leadership of incumbent Prime Minister Gaston Browne.

In 2015, Antigua and Barbuda established the Marine Ecosystem Protected Areas (MEPA) Trust, a mechanism for funding marine conservation and supporting local environmental efforts, alongside the national Environmental Protection and Management Act (EPMA) to create a framework for sustaining marine protected areas and their biodiversity. In 2016, Nelson's Dockyard was designated as a UNESCO World Heritage Site.

Most of Barbuda was devastated in early September 2017 by Hurricane Irma, which brought winds with speeds reaching 295 km/h (185 mph). The storm damaged or destroyed 95% of the island's buildings and infrastructure, leaving Barbuda "barely habitable" according to Prime Minister Gaston Browne. Nearly everyone on the island was evacuated to Antigua. Amidst the following rebuilding efforts on Barbuda that were estimated to cost at least $100 million, the government announced plans to revoke a century-old law of communal land ownership by allowing residents to buy land; a move that has been criticised as promoting "disaster capitalism".

== Geography ==
Antigua and Barbuda

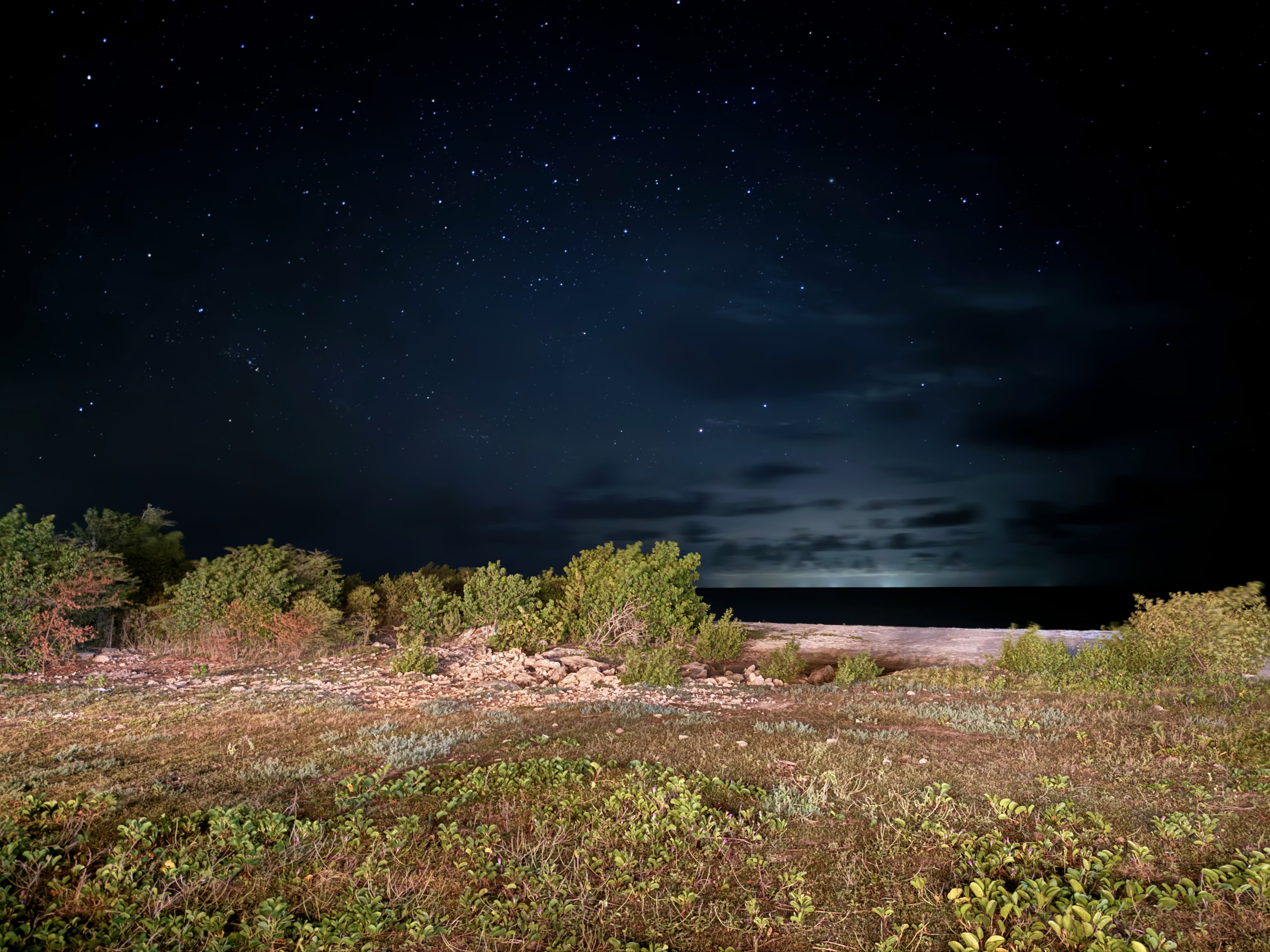
Antiguan city lights seen from the South Coast of Barbuda. Light pollution is a major problem in the country.

Limestone formations, rather than volcanic activity, have had the most impact on the topography of both Antigua and Barbuda, which are both relatively low-lying islands. Boggy Peak, also known as Mt. Obama from 2008 to 2016, is the highest point on both Antigua and Barbuda. It is the remnant of a volcanic crater and rises a total of 402 meters. Boggy Peak is located in the southwest of Antigua (1,319 feet).

Both of these islands have very irregularly shaped coastlines that are dotted with beaches, lagoons, and natural harbours. There are reefs and shoals that surround the islands on all sides. Because of the low amount of rainfall, there are not many streams. On neither of these islands can sufficient quantities of fresh groundwater be found.

Redonda is a small, uninhabited island located about 40 kilometres (25 miles) to the south-west of Antigua. Redonda is a rocky island.

In Antigua and Barbuda, forest cover is about 18% of the total land area, equivalent to 8,120 ha of forests in 2020, down from 10,110 ha in 1990.

=== Islands ===
Antigua and Barbuda consists mostly of its two namesake islands, Antigua, and Barbuda. Other than that, Antigua and Barbuda's biggest islands are Guiana Island and Long Island off the coast of Antigua, and Redonda island, which is far from both of the main islands.

=== Climate ===
Rainfall averages 990 mm (39 in) per year, with the amount varying widely from season to season. In general, the wettest period is between September and November. The islands generally experience low humidity and recurrent droughts. Temperatures average 27 °C (80.6 °F), with a range from 23 °C (73.4 °F) to 29 °C (84.2 °F) in the winter to from 25 °C (77.0 °F) to 30 °C (86.0 °F) in the summer and autumn. The coolest period is between December and February.

Hurricanes are common, including the powerful Category 5 Hurricane Irma, on 6 September 2017, which damaged 95% of the structures on Barbuda. Some 1,800 people were evacuated to Antigua.

Officials quoted by Time indicated that over $100 million would be required to rebuild homes and infrastructure. Philmore Mullin, Director of Barbuda's National Office of Disaster Services, said that "all critical infrastructure and utilities are non-existent – food supply, medicine, shelter, electricity, water, communications, waste management". He summarised the situation as follows: "Public utilities need to be rebuilt in their entirety... It is optimistic to think anything can be rebuilt in six months ... In my 25 years in disaster management, I have never seen something like this."

=== Environmental issues ===
Like other island nations, Antigua and Barbuda faces unique environmental issues created by its proximity to the ocean, and small size. These include pressures on drinking water resources, natural ecosystems, and deforestation more generally.

Existing issues on the island are further made worse by climate change, where, not unlike other island nations affected by climate change, sea level rise and increased weather variability, create increased pressures on the communities on the islands and the land, through processes like coastal erosion and saltwater intrusion.

Not only do these issues threaten the residents of the island, but also interfere with the economy – where tourism is 80% of the GDP. The 2017 hurricane season was particularly destructive, with Hurricane Maria and Hurricane Irma, repeatedly damaging vulnerable infrastructure on the islands of Antigua and Barbuda.

== Government and politics ==
Charles III
King of Antigua and Barbuda

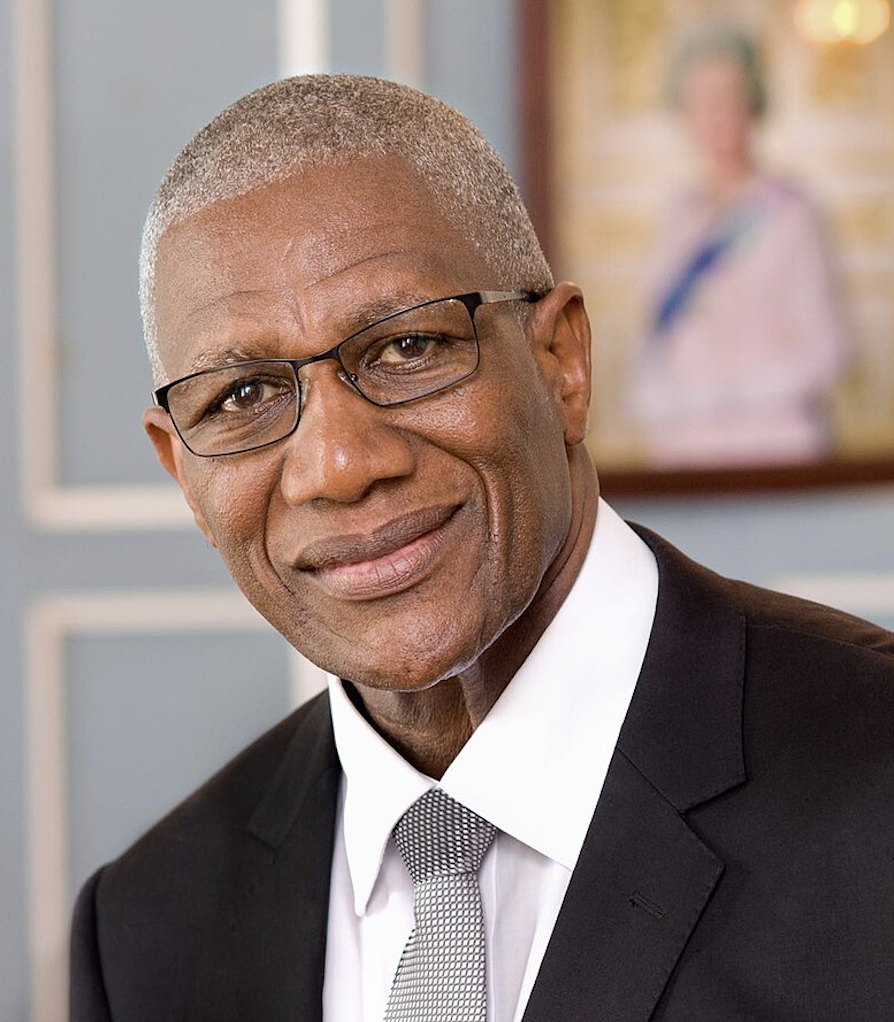
Rodney Williams
Governor-General of Antigua and Barbuda

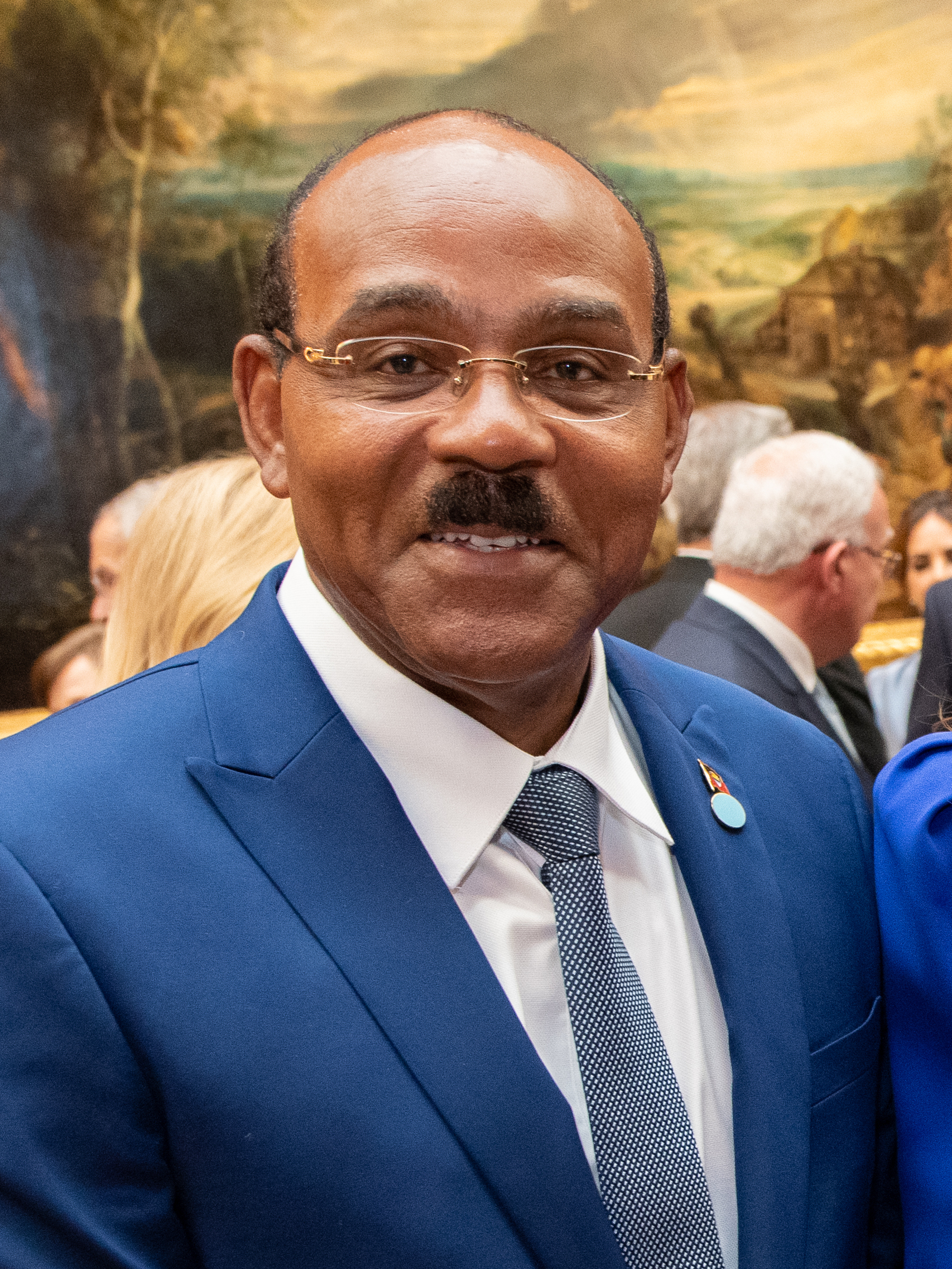
Gaston Browne
Prime Minister of Antigua and Barbuda

=== Government ===
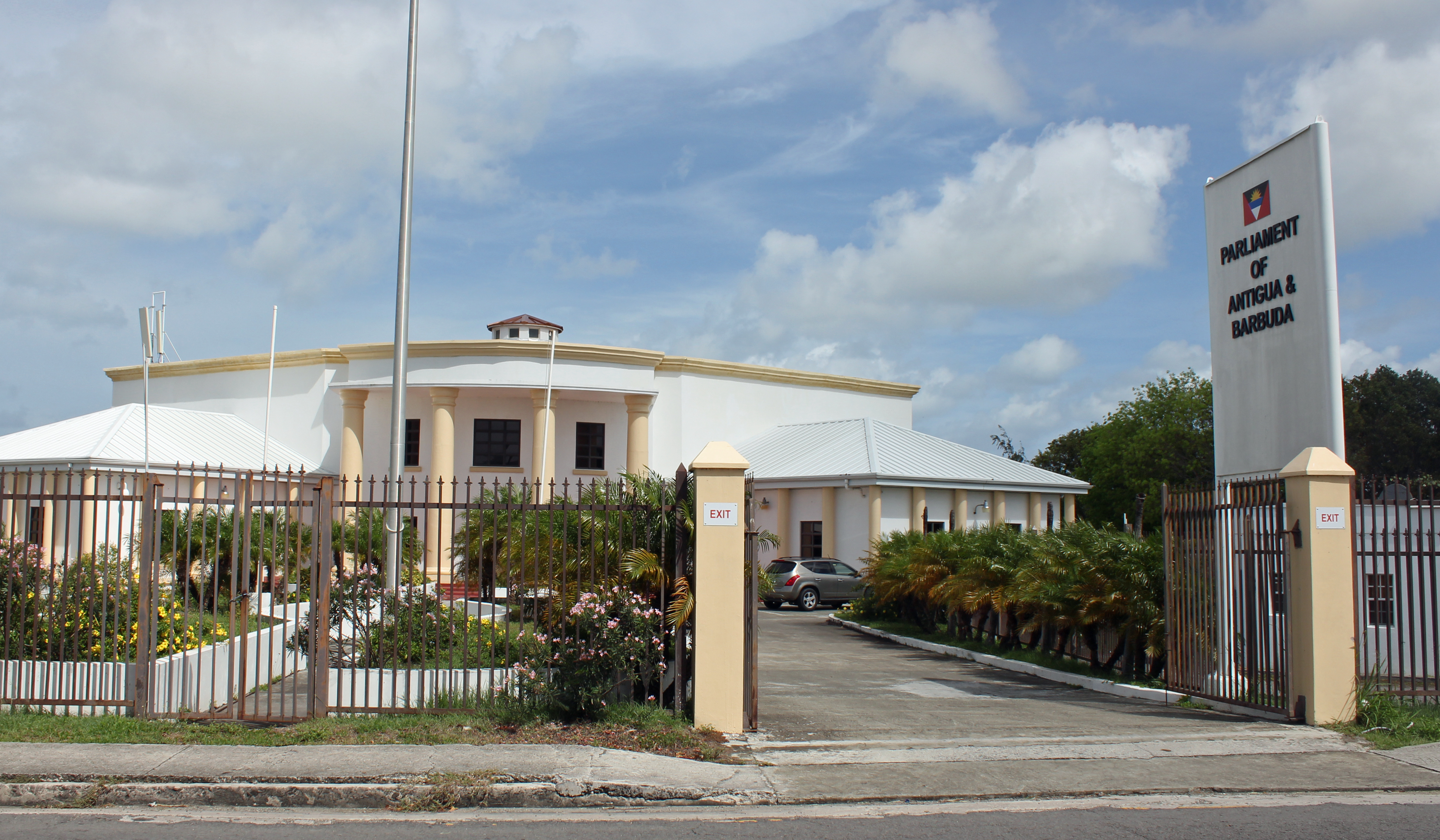
The meeting place of the Parliament of Antigua and Barbuda

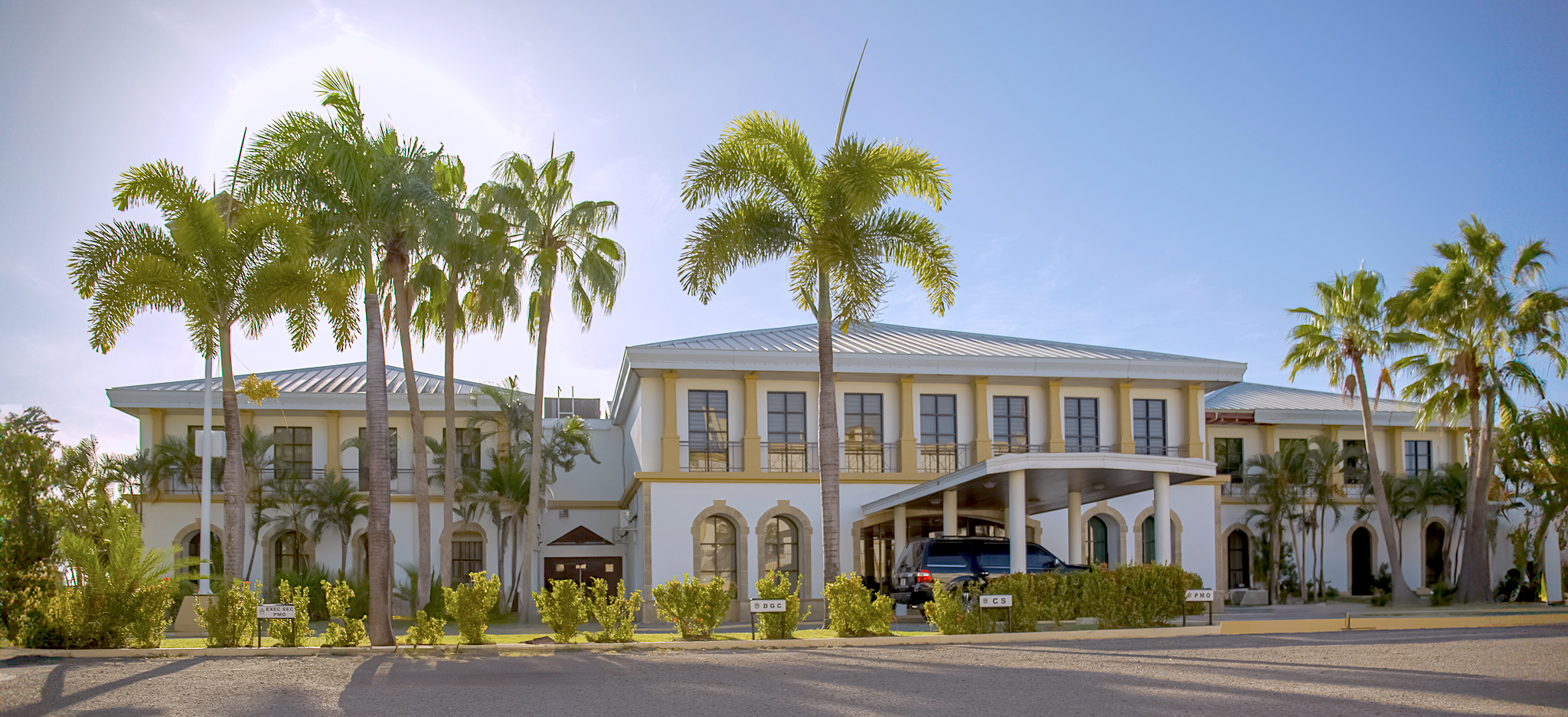
The Office of the Prime Minister and Ministry of Foreign Affairs

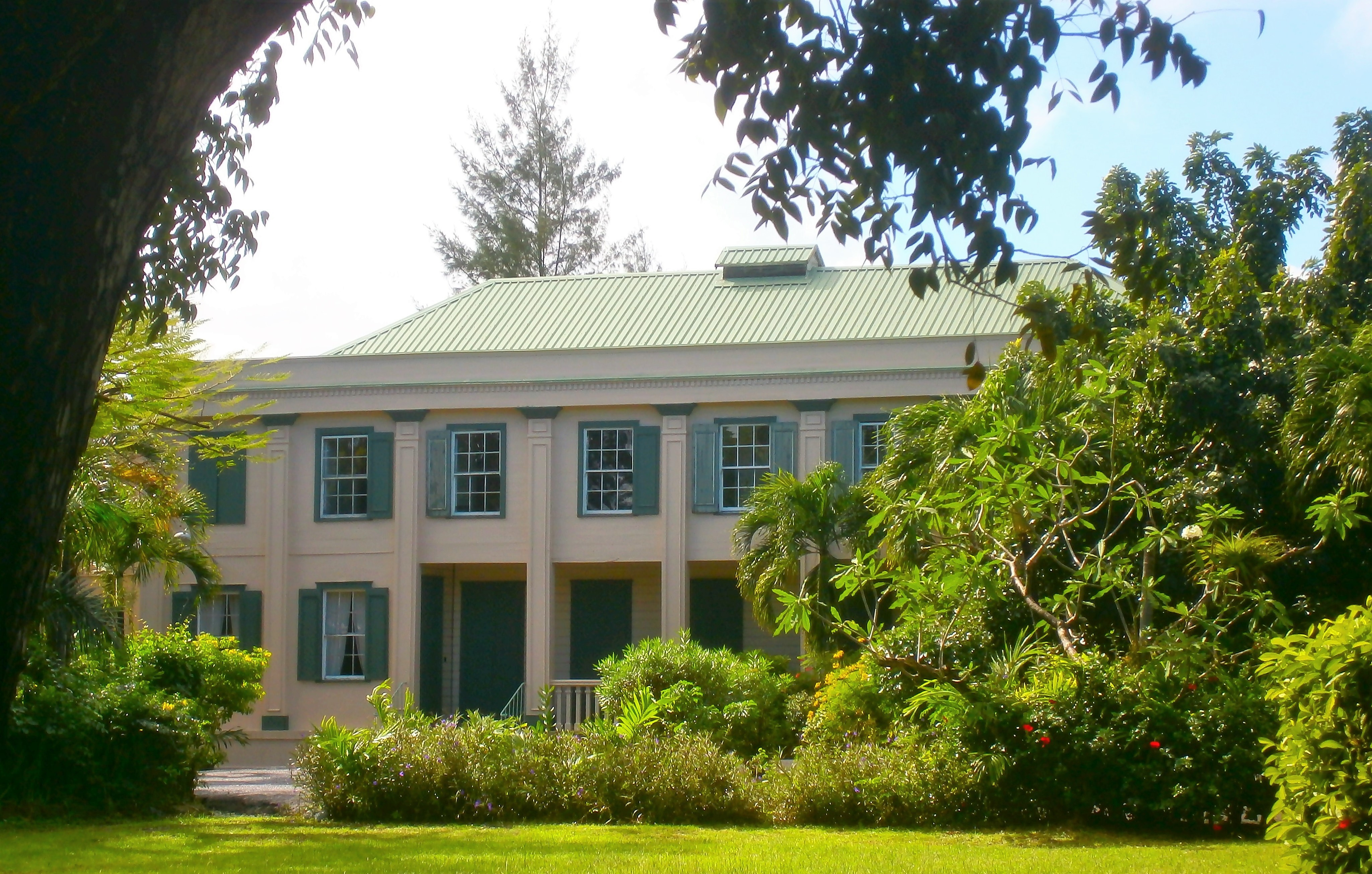
Government House, the official residence and working place of the Governor-General

Antigua and Barbuda is a unitary parliamentary democracy under a constitutional monarchy. The current Constitution of Antigua and Barbuda was adopted upon independence on 1 November 1981. This replaced the pre-independence constitution of the Associated State of Antigua, which did not thoroughly define the relationship between the two islands. The island of Barbuda maintains much autonomy, while the island of Antigua is directly governed by the national government.

The executive branch has two primary leaders. The Governor-General, currently Rodney Williams, exercises the functions of the Monarch of Antigua and Barbuda, in whom executive power is vested. The Governor-General serves at the pleasure of the Monarch, and usually serves a similar term to that of the Prime Minister. The Prime Minister, currently Gaston Browne, is the head of government, and is appointed by the Governor-General. The Prime Minister must be a member of the House of Representatives, and must be the member of the House of Representatives who is most likely to command the support of the majority of members. The Governor-General has the ability to dissolve Parliament on the advice of the Prime Minister, or when the majority of the members of the House of Representatives pass a motion of no confidence, and the Prime Minister does not within seven days resign or advise the Governor-General to dissolve Parliament.

The legislative power of Antigua and Barbuda is vested in Parliament, which is composed of the Monarch, the Senate, and the House of Representatives. The Senate is composed of seventeen members, who are appointed by the Governor-General. Ten of the members are appointed on the advice of the Prime Minister, these members being known as government senators. An eleventh government senator is also appointed on the advice of the Prime Minister, who must be an inhabitant of Barbuda. Four of the members are appointed on the advice of the Leader of the Opposition, these senators being known as opposition senators. One of the members is appointed on the advice of the Barbuda Council, and an independent senator is appointed under the discretion of the Governor-General himself. The House of Representatives is currently composed of seventeen elected members, as well as the Speaker of the House, who is elected by the members of the House itself. The Attorney General, while currently an elected member of Parliament, Steadroy Benjamin, may also be appointed to the House of Representatives as an ex officio member. The Attorney-General also attends sittings of the Senate. Any bill except money bills may be introduced in either chamber: money bills may only be introduced in the House. Parliament may not amend the Barbuda Local Government Act without the consent of the Barbuda Council.

The judiciary of Antigua and Barbuda is composed of the magistrates' courts, the Supreme Court including the High Court and the Court of Appeal, and the Judicial Committee of the Privy Council, the country's final court. Antiguan and Barbudan voters rejected a proposal to make the Caribbean Court of Justice the final court in 2018. Antigua and Barbuda is composed of three magistrates' courts districts, and is part of the Eastern Caribbean Supreme Court system. The acting chief justice of the Supreme Court is Margaret Price Findlay.

Since the 1990s, the two major parties in Antigua have been the centre-right (formerly left-wing) Antigua and Barbuda Labour Party, and the left-wing social democratic United Progressive Party. The Labour Party and its predecessors have traditionally been the dominant party on the national level since the 1946 general elections, with brief pauses during the Progressive Labour Movement government (predecessor of the UPP) from 1971 to 1976, and the United Progressive Party government from 2004 until 2014. On Barbuda, dominant party is traditionally the Barbuda People's Movement, being the only political grouping in the Barbuda Council since 2021.

=== Administrative divisions ===
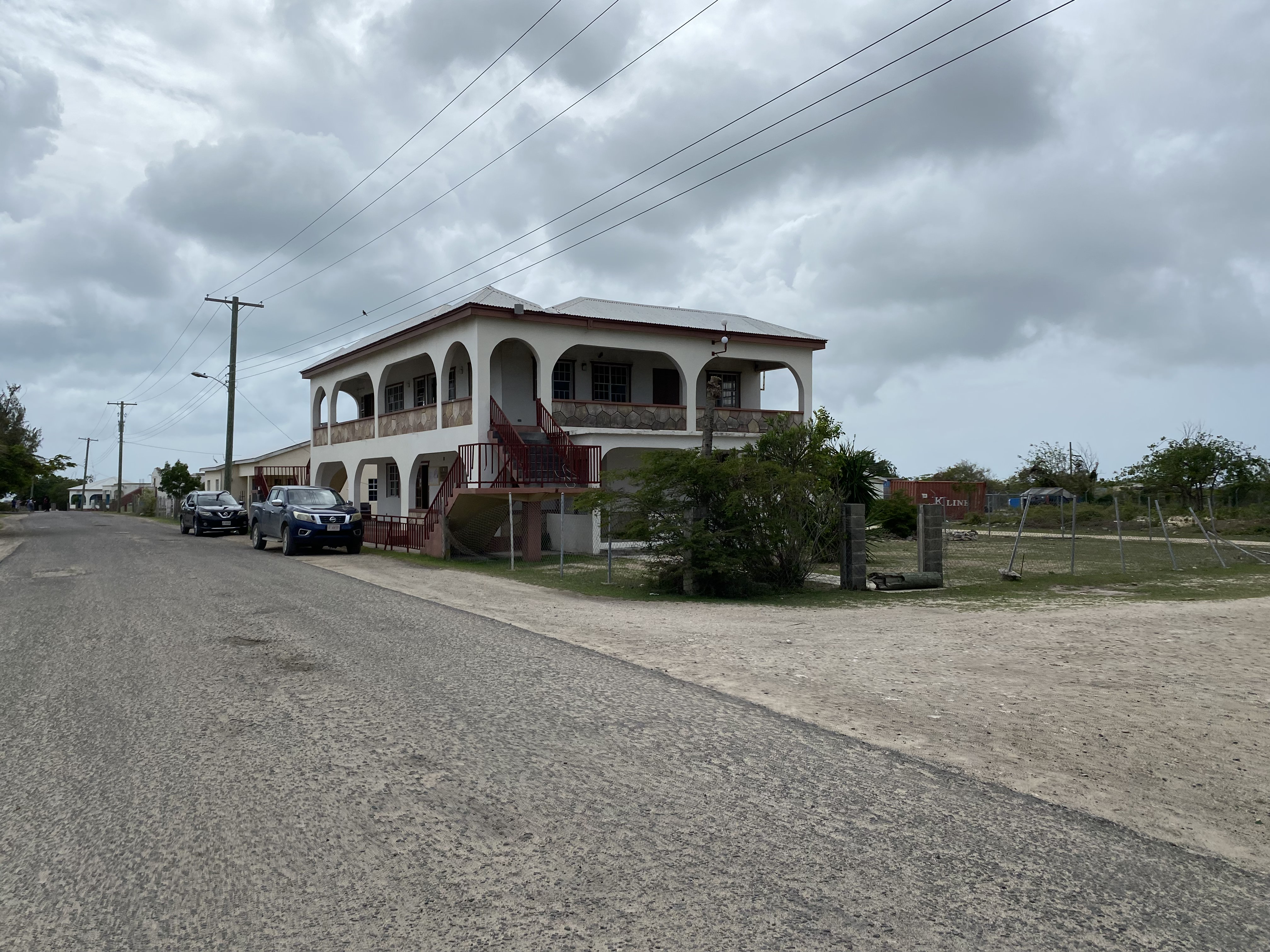
The headquarters of the Secretary of the Barbuda Council in Codrington

Parish and dependency capitals

Antigua and Barbuda is composed of six parishes and two dependencies. Saint John is the most populous parish, home to well over half of Antigua and Barbuda's population. During colonial times, the parishes were governed by parish vestries, however, the parishes now lack any sort of government. Since the 2023 general elections, various proposals have been made to establish parish councils, however, as of January 2025, none have been established. The dependency of Redonda is part of the parish of Saint John under the Redonda Annexation Act, in Magistrates' District "A". Barbuda is composed of eight districts that are eventually intended to have local government powers.

- Parishes
  1. Saint George
  2. Saint John
  3. Saint Mary
  4. Saint Paul
  5. Saint Peter
  6. Saint Philip
- Dependencies
  1. Barbuda
  2. Redonda

Local government in Antigua and Barbuda is completely inactive, except for the Barbuda Council which is enshrined in the Constitution. Antigua historically had a system of village councils in the 1940s (although the legislation was never repealed), however, the Gaston Browne administration has expressed opposition to all forms of local governance. St. John's also historically had a city council during the late 1800s and early 1900s, however the St. John's Development Corporation has since consumed most of its functions.

=== Foreign relations ===
Diplomatic relations of Antigua and Barbuda

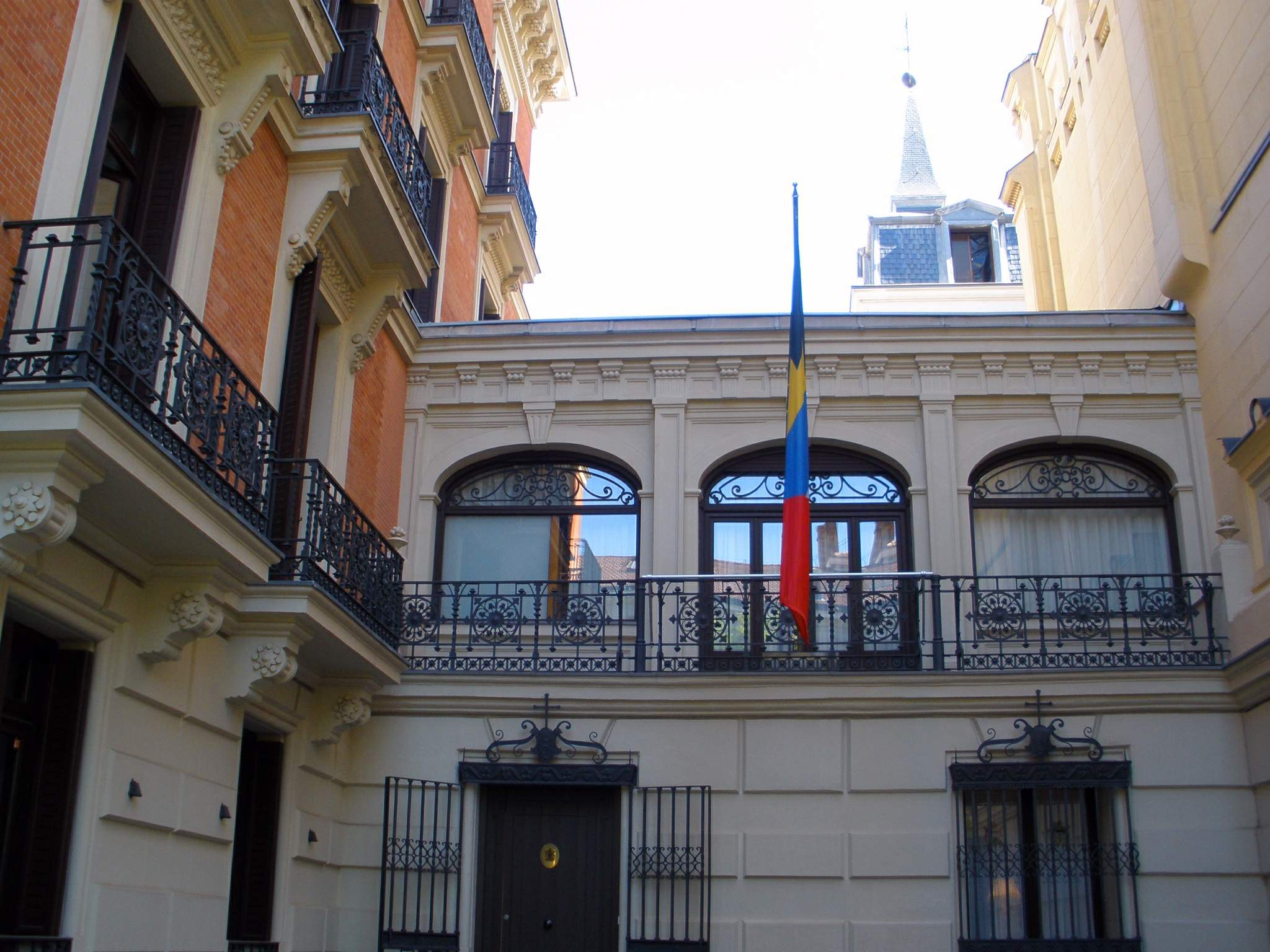
Embassy of Antigua and Barbuda in Madrid

The Minister of Foreign Affairs, Trade and Barbuda Affairs is responsible for overseeing the foreign relations of Antigua and Barbuda. The current minister is Paul Chet Greene. Antigua and Barbuda is a founding member of the Organisation of Eastern Caribbean States, as well as a member of the United Nations, the Caribbean Community, the Alliance of Small Island States, and the World Trade Organisation.

Antigua and Barbuda's foreign policy has been described by Gaston Browne as "we are friends of all; enemies of none". Antigua and Barbuda has rejected the notion that it is in any country's "backyard". Antigua and Barbuda usually maintains close relations with other Small Island Developing States, and has hosted various summits on that subject. The United Nations has also praised Antigua and Barbuda for its "United Nations-based multilateralism" efforts. Antigua and Barbuda also has close relations with many Caribbean countries and territories, especially Montserrat, which Antigua and Barbuda accepted 3,000 refugees from in 1997 after the Soufrière Hills eruption. Many policies adopted by the Antiguan and Barbudan government have also often had an impact on Montserrat, due to Antigua and Barbuda hosting the main transportation links into the territory.

=== Defence and national security ===
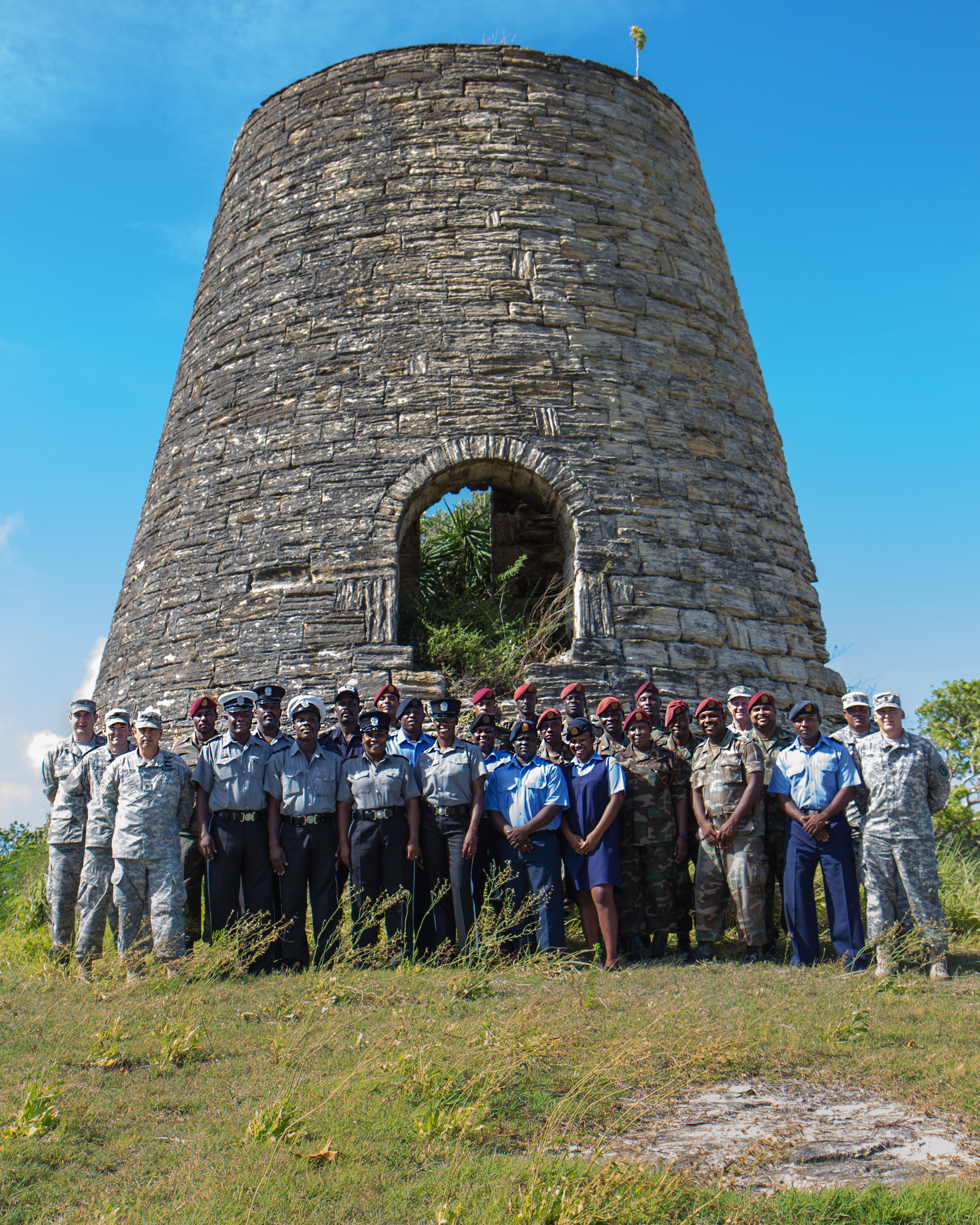
Various members of the national security infrastructure of Antigua and Barbuda posing with the Florida National Guard at a sugar estate

The Minister of Finance, Corporate Governance and Public Private Partnerships is responsible for the Antigua and Barbuda Defence Force, the country's military. The Minister of Legal Affairs, Public Safety, Immigration and Labour is responsible for the national security of Antigua and Barbuda. The Defence Force consists of the Regiment (army), the Air Wing, the Coast Guard, the Cadet Corps, and the Service and Support Unit. The Defence Force is led by the Chief of Defence Staff, who is subject to the orders of the Governor-General. The Defence Force is headquartered at Camp Blizzard.

The National Security Council is responsible for the coordination of Antigua and Barbuda's national security. The National Security Adviser is a member of the council and is responsible for the gathering of intelligence and information on national security matters.

The Royal Police Force of Antigua and Barbuda is the national police department. The Special Service Unit is Antigua and Barbuda's police tactical unit. The Police Force is composed of four lettered regional divisions, and subordinated service districts.

=== Human rights ===
Violations of human rights in Antigua and Barbuda have been increasingly reported since 2017. In particular, a crisis caused by Hurricane Irma has resulted in a deterioration of the relationship between the two main islands, with the central government repeatedly threatening to abolish the communal land system and allow non-Barbudans to purchase land on the island. Freedom of the press, while guaranteed by the constitution, is not fully protected in Antigua and Barbuda, and members of the government are known to frequently sue political opponents and independent media houses for defamation. Due to attacks on freedom of the press, self-censorship is common in the media, especially in the state-controlled Antigua Broadcasting Service. Antigua and Barbuda has been considered a democracy since 2004.

Constitutionally, the death penalty is legal, however, the constitution explicitly protects against inhumane punishment. Freedom of movement, assembly, and property are all protected under the constitution. The High Court legalised same-sex sexual activity in July 2022. Abortion is illegal in Antigua and Barbuda except to save the mother's life, although 72% of women have an abortion by age 44. The court system is considered independent in Antigua and Barbuda, with the courts especially distancing themselves from the government since 2022. Trial by jury was largely abolished in 2024.

== Economy ==
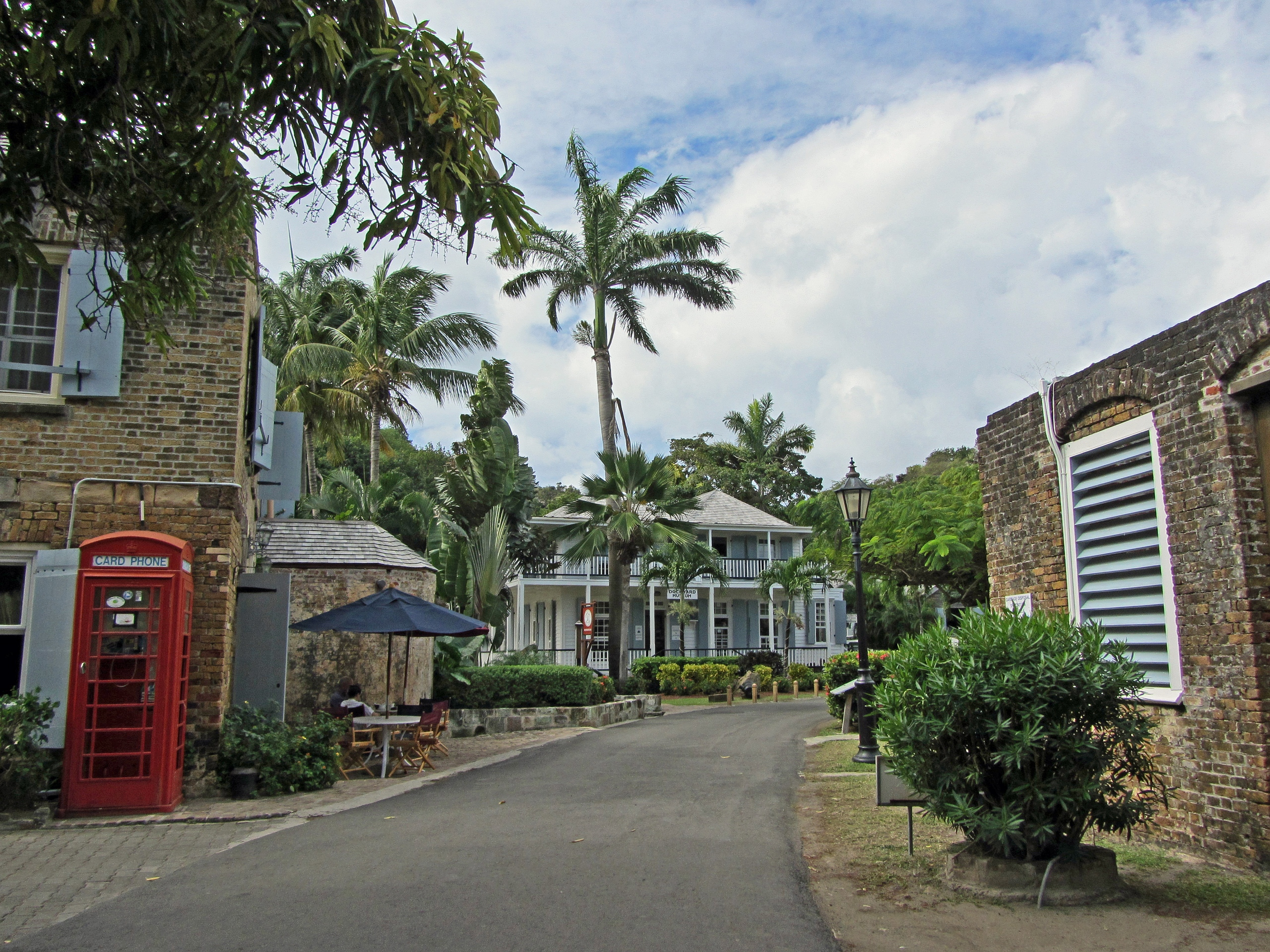
English Harbour, a major tourist destination

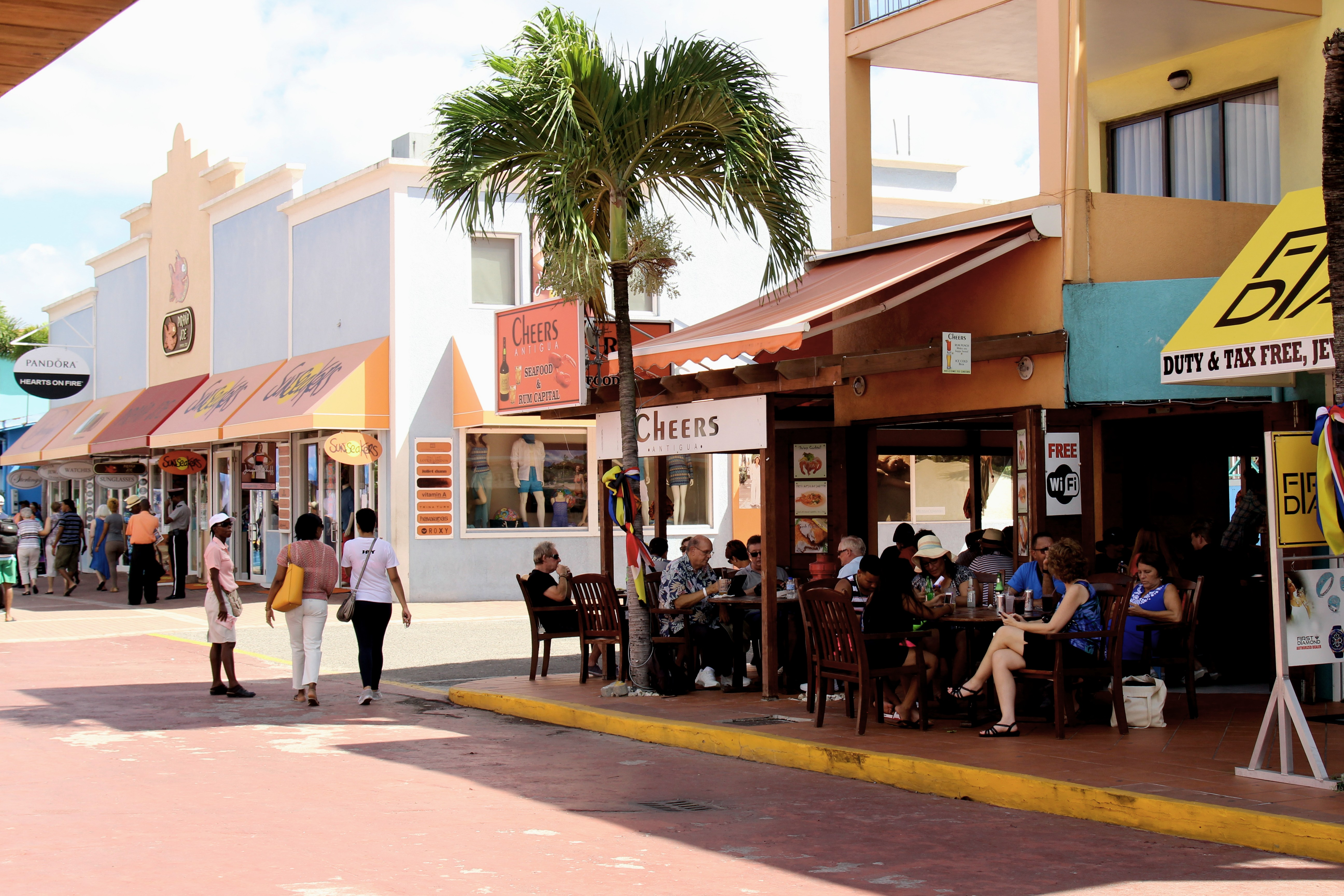
Heritage Quay in Downtown St. John's, the centre of cruise tourism in the country

Tourism dominates the economy, accounting for more than half of the gross domestic product (GDP). As a destination for the most affluent travellers, Antigua is well known for its extensive collection of five-star resorts. However, weaker tourist activity in lower and middle market segments since the beginning of the year 2000 has slowed the economy and put the government into a tight fiscal corner. Antigua and Barbuda has enacted policies to attract high-net-worth citizens and residents, such as abolishing personal income tax in 2016.

The provision of investment banking and financial services also constitutes a significant portion of the economy. Major international financial institutions such as the Royal Bank of Canada (RBC) and Scotiabank both maintain offices in Antigua. PriceWaterhouseCoopers, Pannell Kerr Forster, and KPMG are some of the other companies in the financial services industry that have offices in Antigua. In February 2009 the United States Securities and Exchange Commission levelled allegations against the Antigua-based Stanford International Bank, part of the Stanford Financial Group, which was owned by Texan Allen Stanford, of orchestrating a massive fraud that resulted in the theft of approximately $8 billion from investors.

Most of the country's agricultural products are sold in local markets. Production is restrained by a limited water supply and a shortage of labourers as a result of the higher wages offered in the tourism and construction industries.

Manufacturing comprises 2% of GDP, mainly for export, the major products being bedding, handicrafts, and electronic components. Prospects for economic growth in the medium term will continue to depend on income growth in the industrialised world, especially in the United States, from which about one-third to one-half of all tourists come.

Access to biocapacity is lower than world average. In 2016, Antigua and Barbuda had 0.8 global hectares of biocapacity per person within its territory, much less than the world average of 1.6 global hectares per person. In 2016, Antigua and Barbuda used 4.3 global hectares of biocapacity per person – their ecological footprint of consumption. This means they use more biocapacity than Antigua and Barbuda contains. As a result, Antigua and Barbuda are running a biocapacity deficit.

The Citizenship by Investment Unit (CIU) is the government authority responsible for processing all applications for Agent's Licenses as well as all applications for Citizenship by Investment made by applicants and their family members. This unit was established by the Prime Minister and is known as the Citizenship by Investment Unit.

== Demographics ==
Population density map of Antigua in 2011

The National Bureau of Statistics estimated a population of 106,365 in 2026, making Antigua and Barbuda one of the least populated countries in the Caribbean. This is an increase of 24% from the 2011 census. Between 2008 and 2020, Antigua and Barbuda had an average of 1,188 live births per year, or one birth every seven hours. In 2011, 62% of Antiguans and Barbudans aged fifteen or over were never married, 27% were married, 5% were divorced or separated, and 3% were widowed. In 2022, the total fertility rate stood at 1.6 children per woman, significantly lower than the average of Caribbean small states. The main driver of population growth in Antigua and Barbuda is immigration.

Antigua and Barbuda's population density of 211 people per square kilometre is considerably low for the region, with Barbuda being among the least densely populated islands in the Caribbean. Antigua and Barbuda is one of the least urbanised countries in the world, with only 24% of the country inhabiting an urban area in 2023. The rural population is considered to be growing. Most of the country resides in the Central Plain that streches between St. John's and English Harbour. The centre of population for 2011 was in St. Claire.

In 2011, the majority of Antiguan and Barbudan homes were detached (84%), with eight per cent being apartments or condos, and the remainder primarily being duplexes or townhouses. Forty-five per cent of homes were owned outright, thirty per cent were rented private, and thirteen per cent were owned with a mortgage.

Largest settlements in Antigua and Barbuda 2011 Antiguan and Barbudan census
Rank	Name	Parish	Pop.	Rank	Name	Parish	Pop.
1	St. John's	Saint John	24,451	11	Montclear	Saint John	1,246
2	All Saints	Multiple	3,438	12	Skyline	Saint John	1,212
3	Bolans	Saint Mary	2,053	13	Jacks Hill	Saint John	1,151
4	Liberta	Saint Paul	2,003	14	Potters Village	Saint John	1,116
5	Piggotts	Saint George	1,931	15	Parham	Saint Peter	1,084
6	Swetes	Saint Paul	1,720	16	Sugar Factory	Saint George	1,051
7	Jennings	Saint Mary	1,481	17	Bendals	Saint John	973
8	Clare Hall	Saint John	1,459	18	Cedar Grove	Saint John	934
9	Willikies	Saint Philip	1,270	19	St. Claire	Saint John	898
10	Old Road	Saint Mary	1,251	20	Freemans	Saint Peter	860

=== Ethnicity ===
Largest ethnic group by enumeration district in Antigua, 2011: African; White; Other mixed; Uninhabited

Respondents in the 2011 census self-reported over fifteen ethnic identities. In order of population, the major pan-ethnic groups chosen were African (87.27%), other mixed (3.80%), Hispanic (2.75%), white (1.65%), Indian (India) (1.11%), other (0.94%), mixed black/white (0.93%), not stated (0.88%), and Syrian or Lebanese (0.67%). The following groups were put in the category of "other": Amerindian (0.37% of the total population), Chinese (0.17%), Asian (0.14%), and Portuguese (0.11%). The remaining were some other ethnicity (0.13%).

By proportion, Antigua and Barbuda has the highest foreign-born population in the Americas, with immigrants making up 30% of the population in 2011. Due to this high immigrant population, people among the African descendant population tend to identify with place of origin rather than with their ethnicity. The largest immigrant groups in Antigua and Barbuda are Guyanese (7.12%), Jamaicans (5.22%), Dominica (4.31%), Americans (3.07%), and Dominican Republic (2.46%). Most immigrants to the country are of African ethnicity, with a notable exception being Dominican Republic immigrants who are mostly of Hispanic origin. Immigrants to Antigua and Barbuda, particularly those from lower-income countries, face significant discrimination in all aspects of society, although foreign-born persons have risen to the ranks of prime minister (Lester Bird) and governor-general (Wilfred Jacobs).

=== Languages ===
Creole dialects in Antigua and Barbuda

Antigua and Barbuda has no official language under any Act of Parliament. Cabinet designated Spanish as an official language on 14 May 2026. The most spoken language in the country is Antiguan and Barbudan Creole, with three of its seven varieties native to the country: North Antiguan, the standard variety spoken in most of the country; South Antiguan, a partially-intelligible variety spoken in an area known as "Round South", and Barbudan, spoken only in Barbuda. The unofficial working language of the country is Antiguan and Barbudan English, which is used by all agencies of government and is the main language of business and academic communication. Virtually all persons who speak Antiguan and Barbudan Creole can also speak English, making nearly all people in the country bilingual. As of 2011, the population used the following as their main language: North Antiguan (57.06%), South Antiguan (8.05%), Guyanese Creole (7.11%), standard English (6.12%), Jamaican Patois (5.21%), Spanish (2.45%), and Barbudan Creole (1.71%). 0.67% spoke an unidentified variety of Antiguan and Barbudan Creole, and the remainder primarily spoke other Caribbean dialects.

=== Religion ===
Religion in Antigua and Barbuda (ARDA 2020 est.)
1. Protestant (71.3%)
2. Catholic (7.91%)
3. Other Christian (13.3%)
4. Baháʼí (1.10%)
5. Islam (0.77%)
6. Hinduism (0.44%)
7. None (1.46%)
8. Other (3.72%)

A majority of Antiguans are Christians, with the Anglicans (17.6%) being the largest single denomination. Other Christian denominations present are Seventh-day Adventist Church (12.4%), Pentecostalism (12.2%), Moravian Church (8.3%), Catholic Church (8.2%), Methodist Church (5.6%), Wesleyan Holiness Church (4.5%), Church of God (4.1%), Baptists (3.6%), Mormonism (<1.0%), as well as Jehovah's Witnesses.

=== Education ===
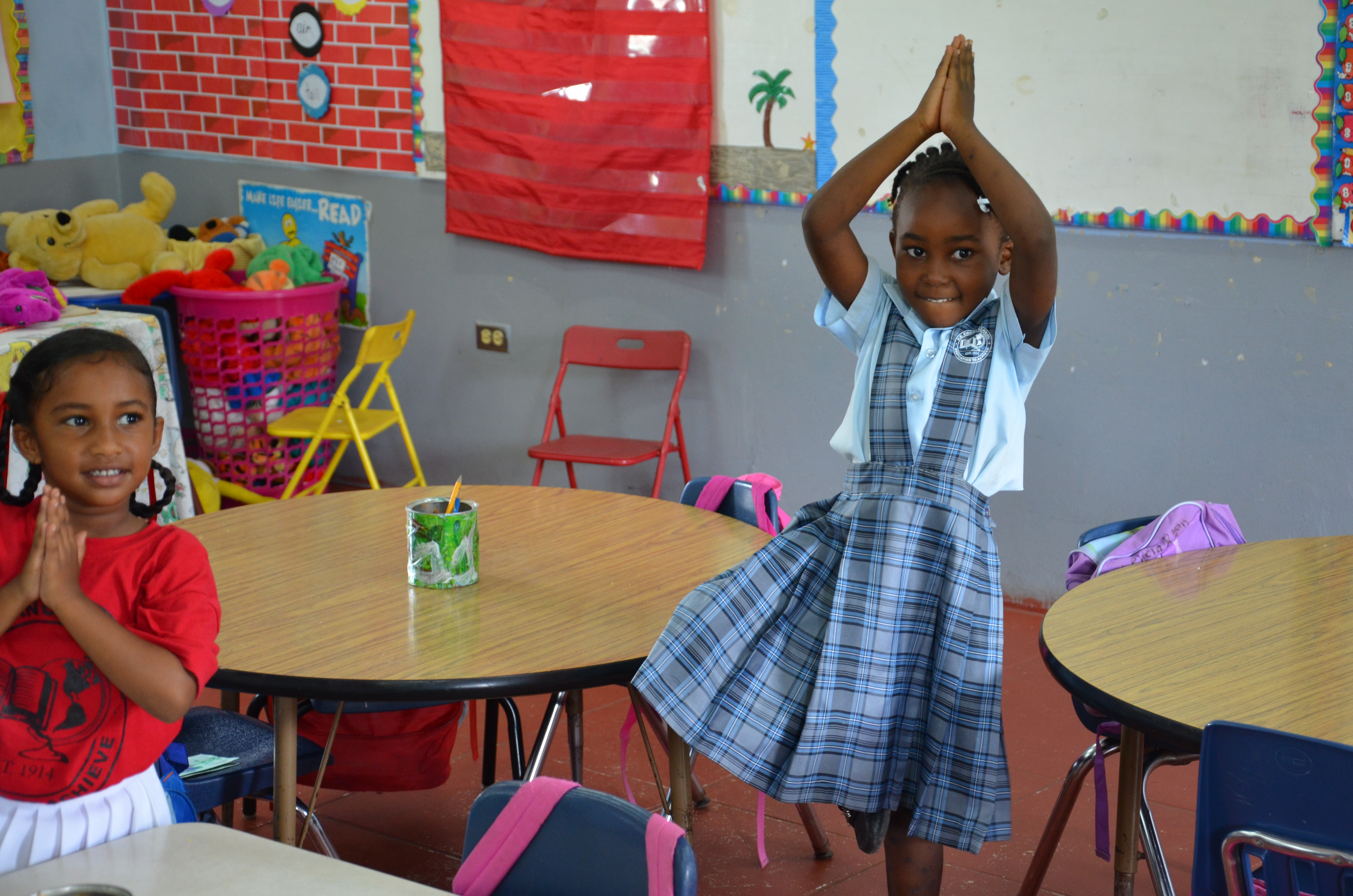
A primary school classroom in St. John's

Antigua and Barbuda has a centralised primary and secondary education system supervised by the Director of Education, currently Clare Browne. Education is free and compulsory for all children between ages five and sixteen. Primary education starts in kindergarten and continues through grades one to six. In the sixth grade, most students sit the Grade Six National Assessment that determines their secondary school placement– with the top one-hundred performers nationwide having the option to attend Antigua Grammar School or Antigua Girls' High School and the lowest performers attending Clare Hall Secondary School geography-permitting. Following primary school, students attend secondary school, which is divided into five forms. Most students terminate their education at fifth form, and among Antiguans and Barbudans aged twenty-five and over in 2011, 16.55% had solely a primary school education, 48.34% had only a secondary education, and 27.24% finished their education in a tertiary institution such as a college or university. In 2023, 3.1% of Antigua and Barbuda's GDP went to education.

Antigua and Barbuda has several tertiary institutions, including a full campus of the University of the West Indies at Five Islands and the Antigua and Barbuda College of Advanced Studies based primarily in Golden Grove. Significant investments into the country's tertiary institutions since the mid-2010s along with near-universal literacy have resulted in the country attracting a large number of foreign students.

== Culture ==
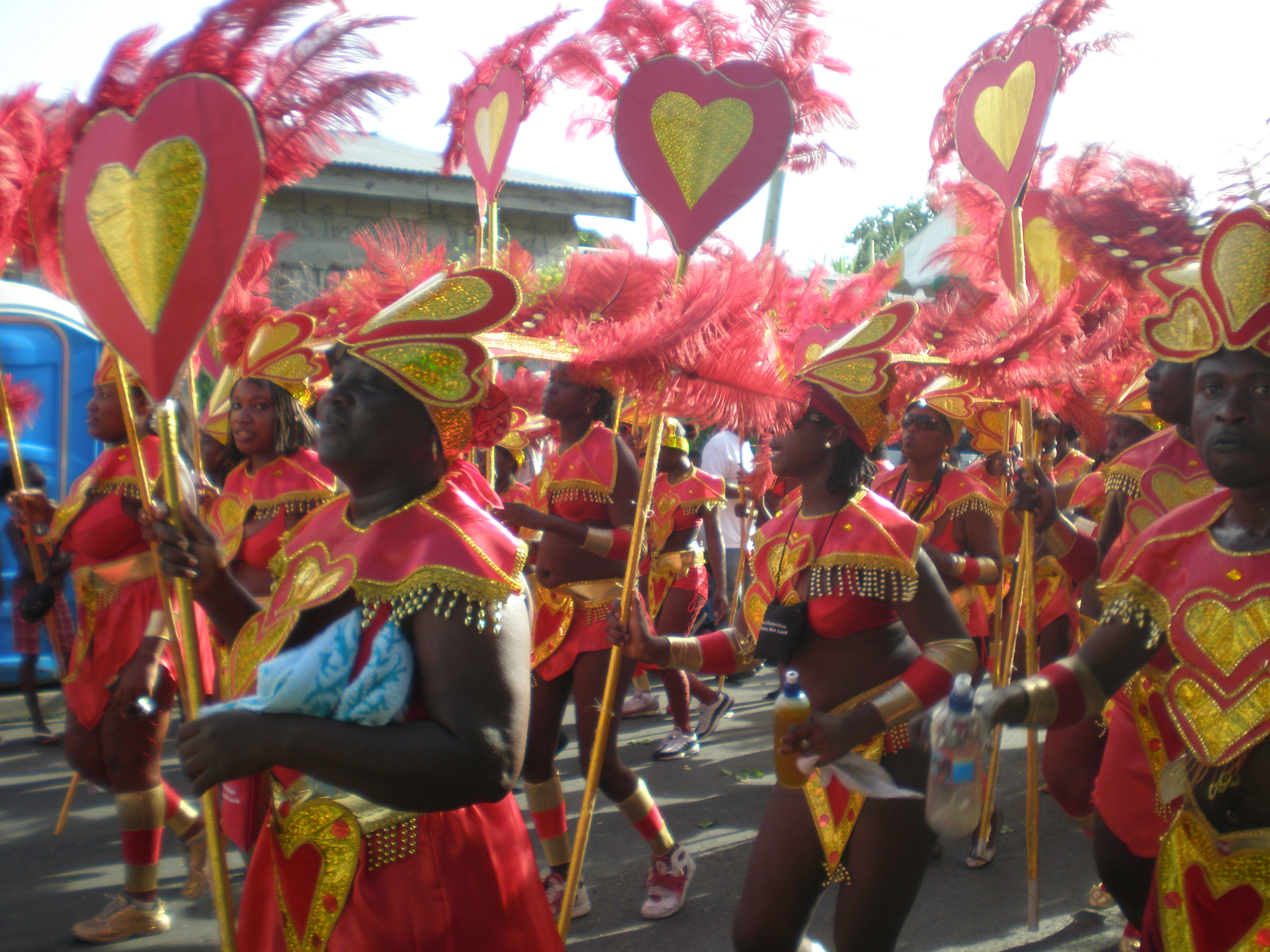
Antigua Carnival

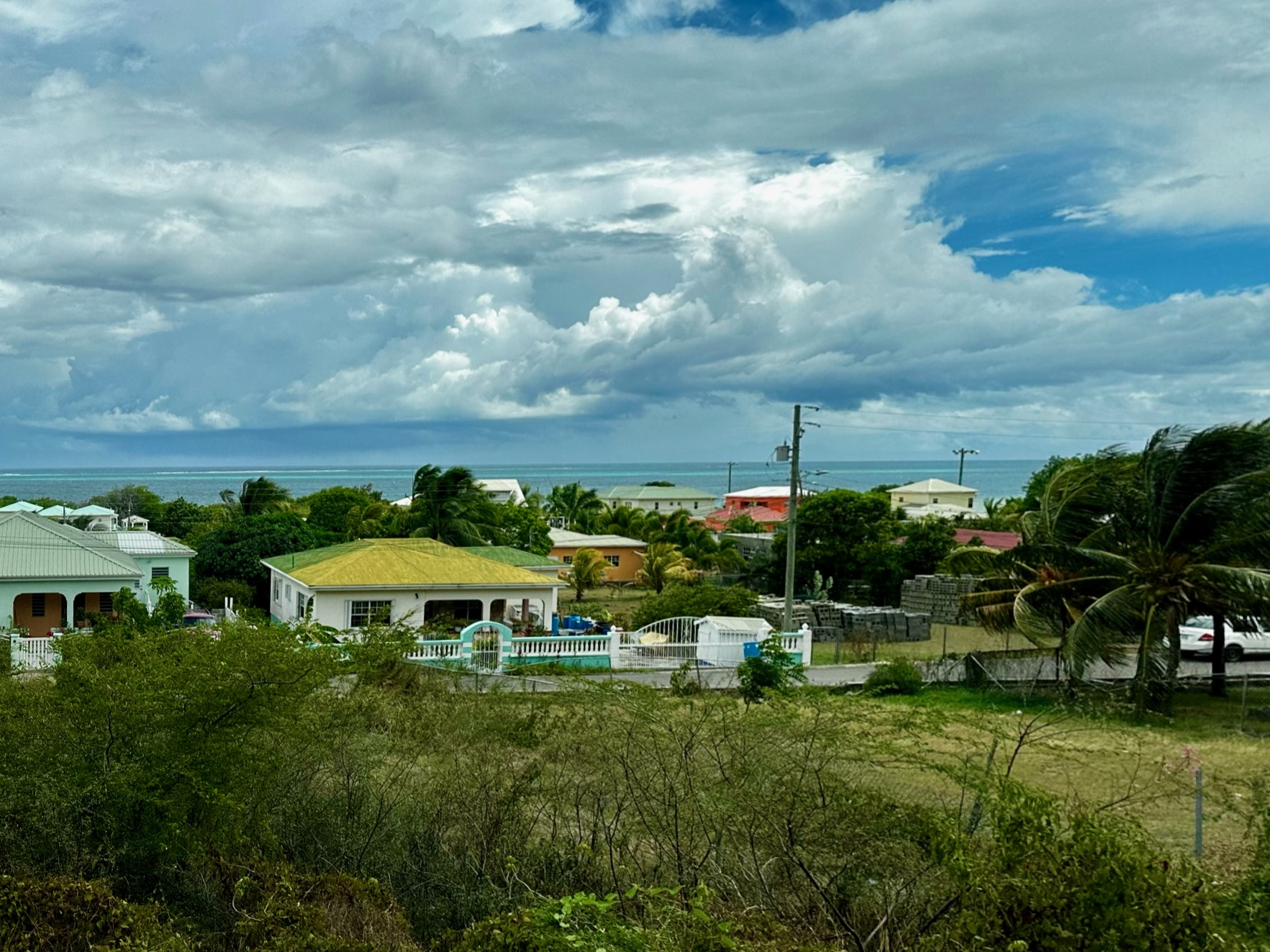
Typical Antiguan homes in Saint Mary

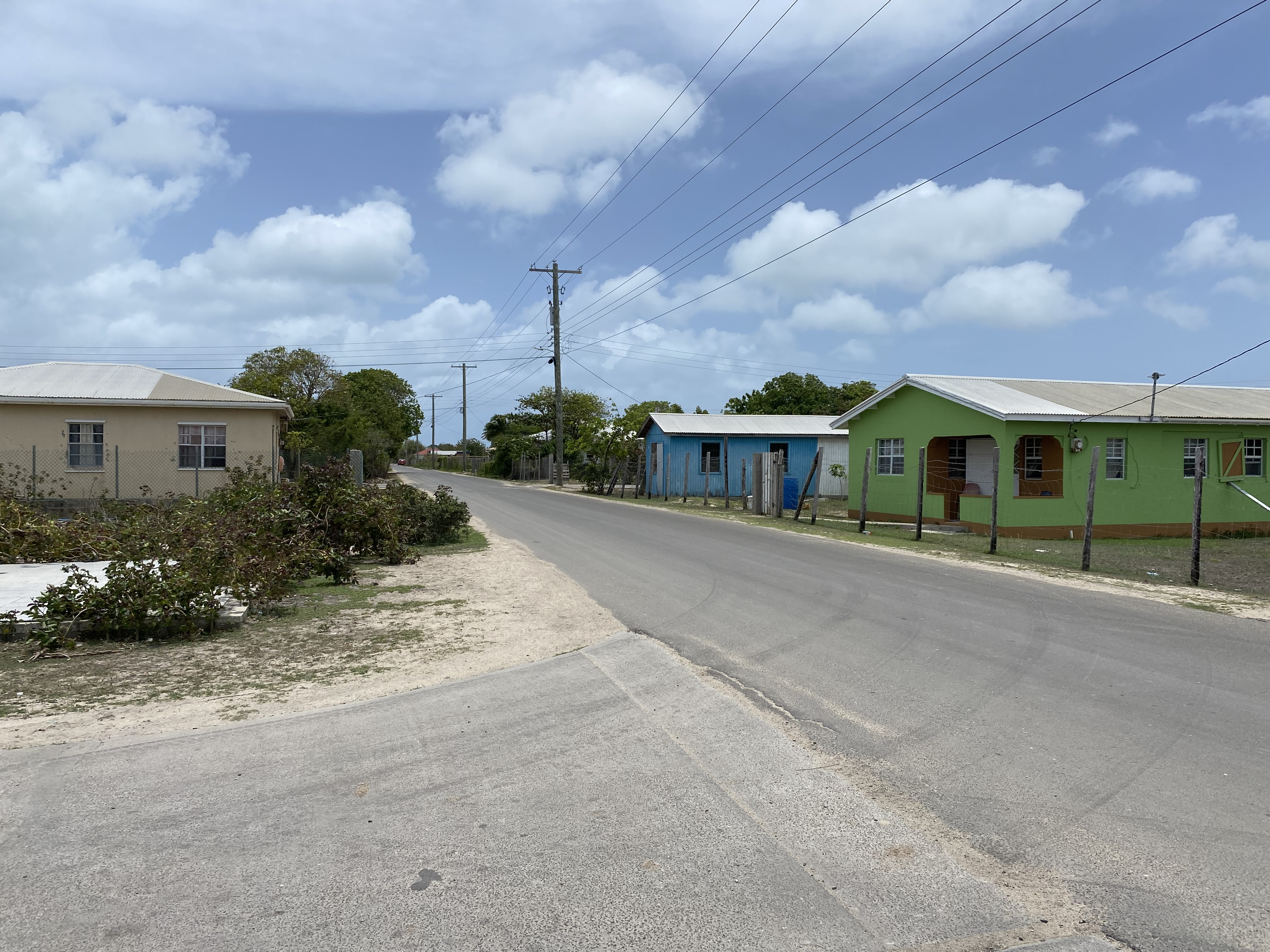
Typical Barbudan homes in Codrington

The music of Antigua and Barbuda has some African characteristics, with minimal influence from European music, but the music is distinct. Records of music in Antigua and Barbuda date back to Christopher Columbus' writings in 1493, when it was still home to Arawak and Carib people, still, very little research has been done on early music from the islands. African labourers are documented in history to have danced outside in the 1780s to the toombah (later tum tum), a drum adorned with tin and shell jingles, and the banjar (later bangoe, maybe related to the European banjo). Antigua's indigenous music, known as Benna, came into being after slavery was abolished. Benna uses a call-and-response format, and its audience is typically interested in obscene gossip and rumours. Benna was widely utilised as a popular communication tool by the beginning of the 20th century, disseminating information around the island. Benna has long been eclipsed by calypso and increasingly soca, which includes South Asian rhythms.

The art of Antigua and Barbuda began with the Arawak people. Their artwork included pictographs and petroglyphs. These geometric shapes, animals, and plant artworks are said to have been used for ceremonial or religious purposes. Painting, sculpture, and ceramics were among the artistic traditions that European settlers brought to Antigua and Barbuda. Local painters used European art forms to produce Antiguan and Barbudan art in their own unique styles. Social issues, nature, and Caribbean identity were the subjects of this artwork. Traditional crafts from Antigua and Barbuda include scrimshaw, pottery, sculptures, ethnic dolls, and photography.

Every year, on the island of Antigua, people celebrate their freedom from slavery with the Antigua Carnival modelled after European pre-Lent Carnival. Over thirteen days, there are brightly coloured costumes, talent events, beauty pageants and music. The celebration runs from late July to Carnival Tuesday, the first Tuesday in August. On the island, Carnival Tuesday and Monday are both observed as public holidays. In an effort to boost travel to Antigua and Barbuda, the Old Time Christmas Festival was replaced in 1957 by the Antiguan Carnival. Another annual festival held in Antigua is Antigua Sailing Week. Sailing Week is a week-long yacht regatta held in the waters of English Harbour. Sailing Week was founded in 1967 and is known for being one of the top regattas in the world. The main festival held in Barbuda is Caribana. Caribana takes place every year during Whit Monday weekend and features various pageants, calypso competitions, and weekend beach parties.

Antigua and Barbuda has eleven public holidays. On the advice of the Cabinet, the Governor-General may also proclaim other holidays. Historically, about three weeks before Christmas Day, carol singers would roam the various villages, carrying carol trees and lanterns. "John Bulls" are replicas of "masked African witch doctors", that often dominated the country's Christmas festivities. Jazz bands were also common sights, dressed in red and green clown costumes.

=== Cuisine ===
The islands' cuisine is mostly of European origin (UK and Portugal) with regional ingredients. Fungee (pronounced "foon-jee") and pepperpot are the national dishes. Fungee is a cornmeal-based dish that resembles polenta. Other national foods include saltfish (cod), lobster (from Barbuda), ducana (a sweet dumpling made from sweet potatoes and coconut), and seasoned rice, similar to Palau or arroz con pollo. Additionally, there are confections such as peanut brittle, sugar cake (made from coconut and sugar), fudge, and raspberry (local) and tamarind stew (sauce). The Antigua black pineapple is prized for its juicy, sweet flesh. It is a well-liked fruit in the area and is included in many regional specialties and sweets. It is said to be the sweetest variety of pineapple.

An important part of the Antiguan and Barbudan breakfast is Antigua Sunday bread. It is sold in many bakeries on both islands, and instead of being made with butter, it is made with lard. There are often decorative twists on the crust of the bread. Antiguan raisin buns, often called "bun and cheese", is another traditional bread, which is sweet and most popular during Easter. It is sometimes made with spices such as nutmeg.

=== Sport ===
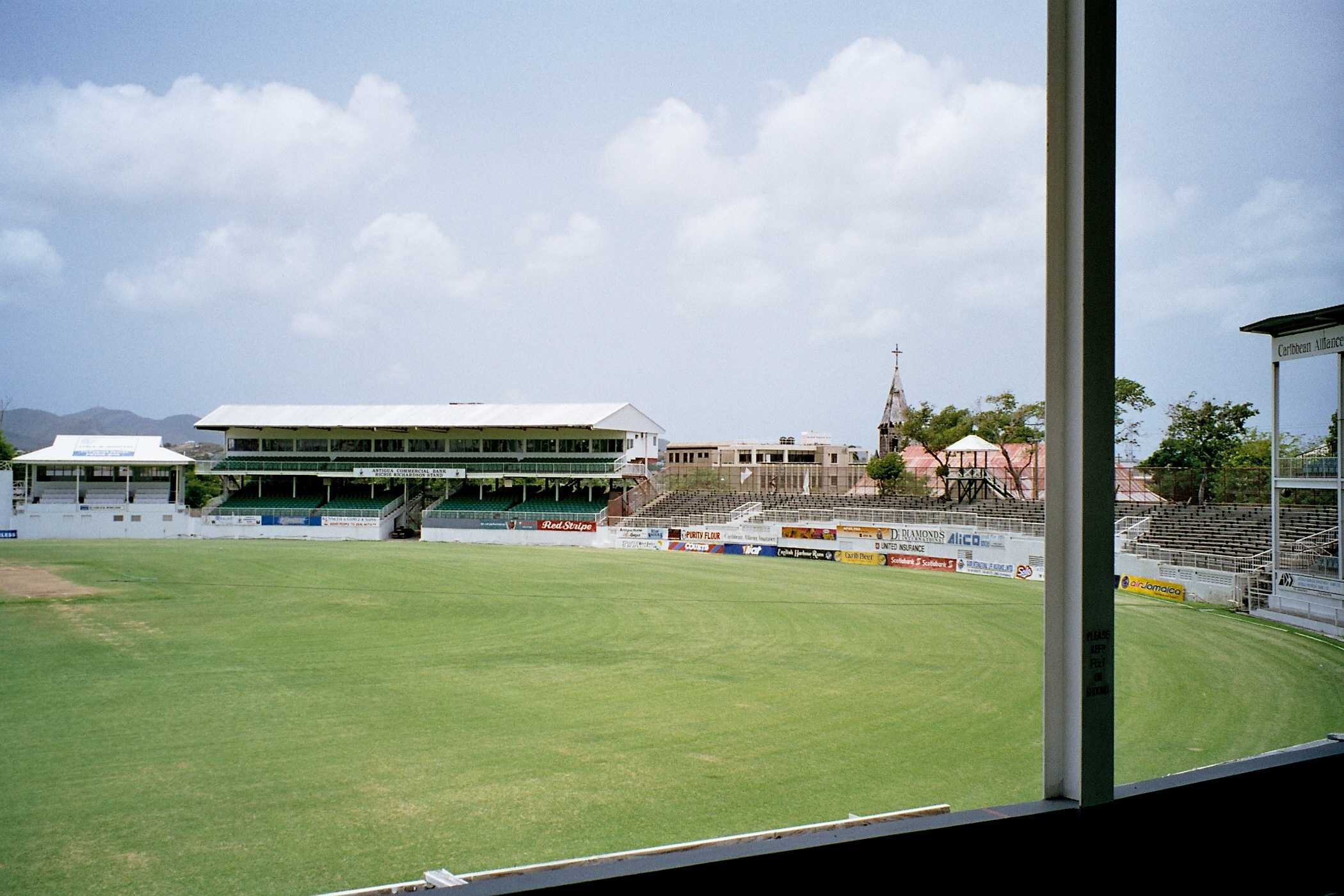
The Antigua Recreation Ground, the national stadium

Cricket is the most popular sport within the islands. Viv Richards represented the West Indies cricket team between 1974 and 1991. The Antigua and Barbuda national cricket team represented the country at the 1998 Commonwealth Games, but Antiguan cricketers otherwise play for the Leeward Islands cricket team in domestic matches and the West Indies cricket team internationally. Teams from the various villages and parishes compete in the Parish League.

Association football is the second most popular sport in the country, with the Antigua and Barbuda national football team being founded in 1928.

== See also ==
- Outline of Antigua and Barbuda
- Index of Antigua and Barbuda–related articles
