= Hispanic Antiguans and Barbudans =

- Distribution of Hispanics

Total population
- 2,330

Languages
- Spanish, English

Religion
- Christianity (Roman Catholicism and Protestantism)

Hispanic Antiguans and Barbudans are Antiguans and Barbudans that have Spanish or Latin American origin. In 2011, it was estimated that there were 2,330 Hispanics living in the country. Most Hispanics in the country are of recent Dominican Republic origin, and large-scale immigration from Latin America began in the country after independence in 1981. Hispanic people now make up about three percent of the population, and the Spanish language is now the third most spoken language in the country. Like many other immigrant communities in Antigua and Barbuda, most Hispanic people struggle economically and are forced to work low-paying jobs. The group faces discrimination and xenophobia, especially due to their association with illegal immigration to the country.

== History ==
The first wave of Hispanic immigrants to Antigua and Barbuda occurred in the 1950s, with mass arrivals from the Dominican Republic. The second wave begun following independence, when Antigua and Barbuda began to develop closer ties with the rest of the Caribbean. In the 1990s, work permits were issued to hundreds of Dominicans a year, eventually exceeding the amount given to CARICOM nationals. It is also said that around this time, many members of an Antiguan community that immigrated to the Dominican Republic in the late nineteenth and early twentieth centuries began to return to the county in mass numbers. Antigua and Barbuda was the country of choice for many Dominicans and other Latin Americans due to their relaxed visa policy and easy conditions for naturalisation. However, members of the community are often only able to find low paying jobs, and many women are forced to work in the country's prostitution sector.

In 1991, the country had a population of 656 Dominicans, 13 Cubans, twelve Venezuelans, three Mexicans. The Hispanic population was very young, aiding the rapid Hispanic population increase in the coming decade. While Hispanics were not recognised as an ethnic group until 2011, by 2001 there were 1,492 Dominicans, and all other Hispanic groups had at least doubled in population. The growth of this community was cited as a reason for adopting Spanish as an official language of the country in 2026.

== Demographics ==
Largest ethnic groups in Antigua and Barbuda apart from Africans and mixed people

According to the 2011 census, Hispanics make up 2.75% of the country's population. The highest percentage was in Saint John, while the lowest percentage was in Barbuda. Hispanics were the largest minority group in Saint John. Approximately 28% of Hispanics were Catholic in 2011. About 8% were irreligious, and the remainder were mostly Protestant. While the Catholic proportion was well above the national average of 6%, Hispanics were only the third most Catholic ethnic group in the country.

=== Distribution ===
The following table shows the distribution of Hispanics by parish and dependency in 2011:

Parish/dependency	Population	Percentage
St. John's (city)	1,360	6.28%
Saint John (rural)	692	2.35%
Saint Mary	55	0.75%
Saint George	77	0.97%
Saint Philip	39	1.17%
Saint Paul	73	0.90%
Saint Peter	27	0.50%
Barbuda	7	0.44%
