= Marble Hill, Antigua and Barbuda =

Coordinates: 17°9′37″N 61°50′28″W

Marble Hill
- Village
- Interactive map of the Marble Hill main place
- Country: Antigua and Barbuda
- Parish: Saint John

Area
  - Total: 1.69 km^{2} (0.65 sq mi)

Population (2011)
  - Total: 271

Marble Hill is a village in Saint John, Antigua and Barbuda. It had a population of 271 people in 2011.

== International relations ==
Marble Hill has been a focus of investment from the People's Republic of China, the Chinese elected to base their embassy in Antigua and Barbuda at Marble Hill and constructed it themselves. It was formally opened in 2022. The government of Antigua and Barbuda also agreed in 2016 to investment from Morocco for a new residential development at Marble Hill.

== History ==
According to the Antigua and Barbuda Statistics Division, the village had a total area of 1.69 square kilometres in 2011. Marble Hill has a 17th-century plantation house that was transformed into a hotel in 2022. The plantation of Marble Hill was known to have been around in 1787 owned by James Nibbs. Nibbs would hold various tenants and owned a number of slaves at Marble Hill. The nearby Dickinson's Bay plantation was also subsumed into Marble Hill in 1787. It was later inherited by Reverend George Nibbs who released all of the slaves at Marble Hill between 1806 and 1834.

== Demographics ==
There were 271 people living in Marble Hill as of the 2011 census. The village was 57.55% African, 11.84% East Indian, 8.57% other mixed, 7.76% white, 5.31% Syrian/Lebanese, 4.08% other, 2.86% Hispanic, and 2.04% mixed black/white. The population was born in many different countries, including 49.80% in Antigua and Barbuda, 8.57% in the United States, 6.53% in "other Asian countries", 5.71% in the United Kingdom, and 4.08% in Canada. The population had diverse religious affiliations, including 19.01% Catholic and 17.36% Anglican.
