= Prostitution in Antigua and Barbuda =

Prostitution in Antigua and Barbuda is legal and common. Related activities such as brothel keeping and solicitation are prohibited. UNAIDS estimate there to be 755 prostitutes on the islands, the majority are migrants from other Caribbean countries. They tend to move around the Caribbean, never staying in one territory for long. In 2011, prostitution was on the rise due to poor economic conditions.

In the capital, St. John's, there is a red-light district in Popeshead Street. The most famous brothel in the street was Wendy's. It had operated for a number of years and was a household name on the island. In 2016 the owners were charged with trafficking. A 'rescue mission' raided the establishment in 2018, looking for trafficking victims. The nearby 'Jam Dung' was also raided.

The NGO, 'Health, Hope and HIV Network', offers counselling and testing for HIV and other STIs to sex workers. Their motto is 'Creating Positive Change' and the organisation receives government funding.

== Sex trafficking ==
Sex trafficking is a problem in Antigua and Barbuda.

Human traffickers exploit domestic and foreign victims in Antigua and Barbuda, and traffickers exploit victims from Antigua and Barbuda abroad. Documented and undocumented immigrants from the Caribbean region, notably Jamaica, Guyana, and the Dominican Republic, are vulnerable to sex trafficking. Authorities reported an increased number of trafficking victims in multiple-destination trafficking, arriving in Antigua and Barbuda for a few months before their traffickers exploited them in other Caribbean countries such as St. Kitts and Nevis and Barbados. Sex trafficking occurs in bars, taverns, and brothels, including with minor girls. There are anecdotal reports of parents and caregivers subjecting children to sex trafficking. There have been reports of trafficking-related complicity by police officers who tend to receive administrative sanctions instead of being tried under the trafficking law.

The Trafficking in Persons (Prevention) Act, 2010, which was amended in 2015 to vest jurisdiction for trafficking cases to the High Court of Justice, prohibits all forms of trafficking and prescribes punishments of 20 to 30 years imprisonment and fines of 400,000 to 600,000 Eastern Caribbean dollars. Experts noted the prosecutor's office had limited staff and resources and were concerned the police were not undertaking proactive raids to uncover sex trafficking cases. Between 2010 and 2015, a total of 43 women were reported to the Directorate of Gender Affairs as being trafficked.

The United States Department of State Office to Monitor and Combat Trafficking in Persons ranks Antigua and Barbuda as a 'Tier 2' country.
