= Multiracial Antiguans and Barbudans =

Total population
- 4,011

Languages
- Antiguan and Barbudan Creole, English

Religion
- Christianity (plurality Roman Catholicism), irreligion

Multiracial Antiguans and Barbudans are Antiguans and Barbudans who have mixed ancestry of two or more ethnicities. Multiracial people are composed of two groups: mixed black/white and other mixed. In 2011, there were 786 mixed black/white people and 3,225 other mixed people. Mixed people have lived in Antigua and Barbuda since the introduction of slaves to the archipelago, and in 1787 the Antiguan census began collecting information on the multiracial population. When a mixed identity first emerged preceding emancipation, multiracial people began to be associated with an "intermediate class", being neither white nor enslaved. Mixed people are the largest minority group in the country.

== History ==
Mixed people in Antigua and Barbuda have long been a divided group, with various positions on the social hierarchy and varying racial identity. In most works regarding the history of mixed people in Antigua and Barbuda, mixed people are usually described by their position on the social hierarchy rather than by complexion or genetic makeup. Like Afro-Antiguans and Barbudans, many mixed people were enslaved until emancipation in 1834. In 1702, all free mixed people were required to choose a master. In 1707, there were a mere eighteen free colored people in Antigua, some being free black people, and some being born-free mixed people. Enslaved mixed people around this time would also sometimes be freed at their father's death. As the century went on, the "free colored" population continued to rapidly increase, eventually reaching about 4,000 in 1820. Most of these free people were women (58%), and 70% of them lived in the parish of Saint John, with smaller concentrations in Falmouth and English Harbour. At this time many mixed people were entrepreneurs, and in 1814 two of them established the island's largest newspaper. Many visitors to the island described this population as economically well off, and many enjoyed certain political rights such as the ability to vote in parish vestry and assembly elections.

Following emancipation, the free colored population was quite diverse, with significant portions of them not being mixed race. The free colored population made up some of the middle class, and people in this class were of varying complexion. However, ethnicity in Antigua was not necessarily a major factor in class determination. Rather, it was "respectability" that determined one's social standing.

== Demographics ==
Distribution of mixed black/white people

Distribution of other mixed people

According to the 2011 census, mixed black/white people make up 0.93% of the population, and other mixed people make up 3.8% of the population. Other mixed people were the largest minority group in every parish and dependency except for Saint Paul and Saint Mary. Mixed black/white people were the largest minority group in Barbuda. A plurality of mixed people were Catholic, with Protestants and irreligious people making up most of the rest of the population.

=== Distribution ===
The following tables show the distribution of mixed people by parish and dependency in 2011:

Mixed black/white
Parish/dependency	Population	Percentage
St. John's (city)	142	0.66%
Saint John (rural)	346	1.17%
Saint George	91	1.14%
Saint Peter	59	1.12%
Saint Philip	16	0.50%
Saint Paul	50	0.61%
Saint Mary	35	0.48%
Barbuda	47	2.88%

Other mixed
Parish/dependency	Population	Percentage
St. John's (city)	944	4.36%
Saint John (rural)	1,333	4.52%
Saint George	411	5.15%
Saint Peter	172	3.24%
Saint Philip	67	2.02%
Saint Paul	163	2.01%
Saint Mary	118	1.61%
Barbuda	16	1.00%
