= International rankings of Antigua and Barbuda =

These are the international rankings of Antigua and Barbuda.

== International rankings ==
Organisation	Survey	Ranking	Year	Source
United Nations Development Programme	Human Development Index	54 out of 191	2022	
Freedom House	Freedom of the Press	66 out of 198	2017	
Good Country Index	Good Country Index	116 out of 163	2017	
Fund for Peace	Fragile States Index	127 out of 179	2022	
United Nations Statistics Division	List of countries and dependencies by area	182 out of 195		
