= Antigua Sunday bread =

Antigua Sunday bread is a type of bread of Antiguan origin. Antigua Sunday Bread is often sold at local bakeries.

Antigua Sunday bread is made without butter, and is instead made with lard. There are often decorative twists on the crust of the bread. Antigua Sunday bread is an important part of the Antiguan breakfast.
