= Skyline, Antigua and Barbuda =

City in Antigua and Barbuda

Skyline
- Village
- Utility Drive in 2023
- Interactive map of the Skyline main place
- Location within Antigua
- Coordinates: 17°7′43.46″N 61°48′50.18″W
- Country: Antigua and Barbuda
- Island: Antigua
- Parish: Saint John
- Major division: Major Division of Clare Hall
- Enumeration districts: 32301, 32302, 32303, 32304, 32305

Population
  - Total: 1,212

Skyline is a village in Saint John Parish, Antigua and Barbuda.

== Demographics ==
Skyline has five enumeration districts.

Ethnic Data
Q48 Ethnic	Counts	%
African descendent	1,061	87.52%
Caucasian/White	8	0.64%
East Indian/India	24	2.00%
Mixed (Black/White)	38	3.10%
Mixed (Other)	44	3.64%
Hispanic	18	1.46%
Syrian/Lebanese	1	0.09%
Other	6	0.46%
Don't know/Not stated	13	1.09%
Total	1,212	100.00%

Religion Data
Q49 Religion	Counts	%
Adventist	142	12.08%
Anglican	220	18.63%
Baptist	19	1.59%
Church of God	39	3.28%
Evangelical	65	5.52%
Jehovah Witness	27	2.25%
Methodist	43	3.65%
Moravian	85	7.21%
Nazarene	12	1.03%
None/no religion	65	5.52%
Pentecostal	176	14.89%
Rastafarian	7	0.56%
Roman Catholic	105	8.90%
Weslyan Holiness	39	3.28%
Other	100	8.52%
Don't know/Not stated	36	3.09%
Total	1,179	100.00%
NotApp :	33	

Country of birth
Q58. Country of birth	Counts	%
Africa	10	0.82%
Other Latin or North American countries	9	0.73%
Antigua and Barbuda	767	63.30%
Other Caribbean countries	18	1.46%
Canada	7	0.55%
Other Asian countries	3	0.27%
Dominica	49	4.01%
Dominican Republic	25	2.09%
Guyana	115	9.47%
Jamaica	87	7.19%
Monsterrat	9	0.73%
St. Kitts and Nevis	11	0.91%
St. Lucia	9	0.73%
St. Vincent and the Grenadines	11	0.91%
Syria	1	0.09%
Trinidad and Tobago	11	0.91%
United Kingdom	11	0.91%
USA	43	3.55%
USVI United States Virgin Islands	2	0.18%
Not Stated	14	1.18%
Total	1,212	100.00%

Country of Citizenship
Q71 Country of Citizenship 1	Counts	%
Antigua and Barbuda	954	78.69%
Other Caribbean countries	12	1.00%
Canada	7	0.55%
Other Asian and Middle Eastern countries	4	0.36%
Dominica	22	1.82%
Dominican Republic	18	1.46%
Guyana	54	4.46%
Jamaica	71	5.83%
Monsterrat	4	0.36%
St. Lucia	2	0.18%
St. Vincent and the Grenadines	6	0.46%
Trinidad and Tobago	3	0.27%
United Kingdom	7	0.55%
USA	28	2.28%
Other countries	7	0.55%
Not Stated	14	1.18%
Total	1,212	100.00%

Country of Second Citizenship
Q71 Country of Citizenship 2	Counts	%
Other Caribbean countries	21	8.68%
Canada	7	2.74%
Dominica	33	13.70%
Dominican Republic	11	4.57%
Guyana	64	26.48%
Jamaica	19	7.76%
Monsterrat	3	1.37%
St. Lucia	7	2.74%
St. Vincent and the Grenadines	6	2.28%
Trinidad and Tobago	9	3.65%
United Kingdom	17	6.85%
USA	31	12.79%
Other countries	15	6.39%
Total	242	100.00%
NotApp :	971	
