= Syrian and Lebanese Antiguans and Barbudans =

- Distribution of Syrian/Lebanese people

Total population
- 570

Languages
- English, Arabic

Religion
- Christianity (Roman Catholicism, Orthodoxy)

Syrian and Lebanese Antiguans and Barbudans are Antiguans and Barbudans of Arab ethnicity, regardless of whether or not they are actually from Syria or Lebanon. The first Syrian and Lebanese people moved to Antigua in the 1950s, and by the 1970s they had formed a small community. Since then, the population has steadily grown to 570 in 2011. The Syrian and Lebanese population is primarily involved in the importing business, and due to this, they form much of the country's upper class.

== History ==
The first Syrians moved to Antigua and Barbuda in the 1950s, with several dozen Syrians living in the country by the 1970s. In 1958, one of the first Syrian families to arrive in the country were the Hadeeds. The Hadeeds now control various businesses in tourism, car sales, and financial institutions. The Hadeed family closely allied with the Bird dynasty, and loaned significant amounts of money to the Lester Bird government. Other Syrian and Lebanese families have also entered the country's upper class, introducing concrete to the country's homebuilding industry and operating tourism businesses. The Lebanese in particular were embraced well, introducing credit to the island after they had first arrived on a ship from New York City. Many Syrian refugees have also come to Antigua and Barbuda since the start of the civil war, with an immigration amnesty in 2022 revealing the existence of a significant undocumented Syrian population.

== Demographics ==
According to the 2011 census, Syrian/Lebanese people make up 0.67% of the Antiguan and Barbudan population. Most Syrian/Lebanese people speak English and Arabic. The highest proportion of Syrian people was in Saint John at around 1%, while the lowest was in Saint Paul which has no Syrian/Lebanese population. 67% of the Syrian/Lebanese population were Roman Catholic, and the remainder were various other denominations, primarily Orthodox. Syrian/Lebanese people were the most Catholic ethnic group in the country, and had the highest proportion (12%) identifying as some other religion. There is a significant population of Syrian/Lebanese people in Radio Range, where they make up about eighteen percent of the population.

=== Distribution ===
The following table shows the distribution of Syrian/Lebanese people by parish and dependency in 2011:

Parish/dependency	Population	Percentage
St. John's (city)	154	0.71%
Saint John (rural)	377	1.28%
Saint Mary	3	0.04%
Saint George	30	0.37%
Saint Philip	2	0.07%
Saint Paul	0	0%
Saint Peter	2	0.04%
Barbuda	2	0.13%
