= Immigration to Antigua and Barbuda =

Map of Antiguan parishes by foreign-born population

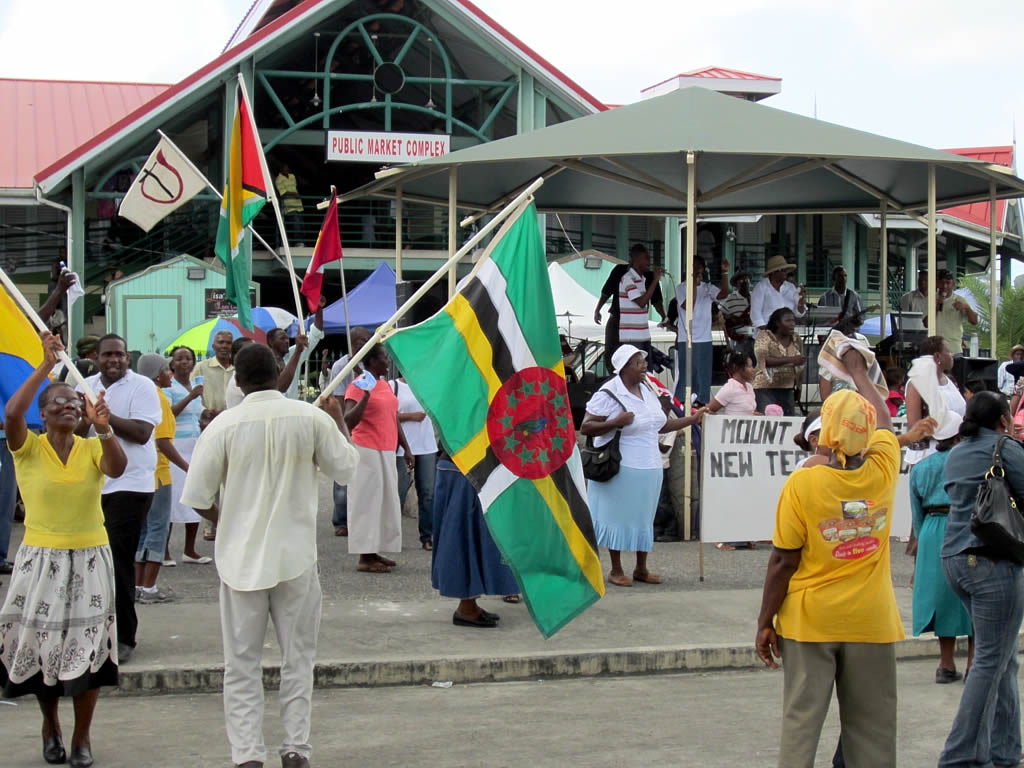
People of various nationalities at a religious event in St. John's

At the 2011 census, there were 25,549 immigrants in Antigua and Barbuda, or 30% of the population. Immigrants usually originate from other Caribbean countries and places that have large Antiguan and Barbudan populations.

== Immigration policy ==
Immigration to Antigua and Barbuda is regulated by the Immigration and Passport Act, most recently amended in 2023. For those wishing to become an Antiguan and Barbudan citizen or resident, one must first apply to the immigration department for an extension to their visa. In addition to standard documentation, one must also prove that they will be able to sustain themselves in the country.

Antigua and Barbuda does receive a large amount of illegal immigration. In 2022 and in certain occasions after, immigration amnesties have been held through a 2022 amendment to the immigration law. An illegal immigrant may apply for a grant of amnesty for a fee of EC$200. In the first April 2022 drive, about 2,000 illegal immigrants took advantage of the program, mostly from Jamaica, Guyana, the Dominican Republic, and Syria. Paul Chet Greene, immigration minister in the right-wing Antigua and Barbuda Labour Party, justified this by stating that many of these illegal immigrants had contributed significantly to Antiguan and Barbudan society, and that many of these people had no criminal record and were just trying to support their families. By June 2022, there were 4,000 applications.

== Statistics ==
Migration origin

In 2011, about 68% of people living in Antigua and Barbuda were born in that country. Most immigrants to Antigua and Barbuda come from various Caribbean countries, such as Dominica, Jamaica, and Guyana. Additionally, there is a sizable minority of immigrants from the Dominican Republic and the United States. Most immigrants usually come from English-speaking countries that have large Antiguan and Barbudan populations or have lower human development indexes.

Place of birth (2011)	Population	%
Africa	296	0.35%
Other Latin or North American countries	165	0.19%
Antigua and Barbuda	58,071	68.47%
Other Caribbean countries	773	0.91%
Canada	357	0.42%
Other Asian countries	389	0.46%
Other European countries	303	0.36%
Dominica	3,654	4.31%
Dominican Republic	2,083	2.46%
Guyana	6,038	7.12%
Jamaica	4,427	5.22%
Monsterrat	633	0.75%
St. Kitts and Nevis	367	0.43%
St. Lucia	598	0.71%
St. Vincent and the Grenadines	669	0.79%
Syria	299	0.35%
Trinidad and Tobago	499	0.59%
United Kingdom	843	0.99%
United States	2,608	3.07%
United States Virgin Islands	405	0.48%
Not Stated	1,341	1.58%
Total	84,816	100.00%

== Demography ==
=== By ethnicity ===
Country of birth (2011)	Ethnic group								
Country of birth (2011)	African descendent	Caucasian/White	East Indian/India	Mixed (Black/White)	Mixed (Other)	Hispanic	Syrian/Lebanese	Other	Don't know/Not stated
Africa	80.45%	13.00%	0.37%	0.36%	2.90%		0.37%	2.20%	0.36%
Other Latin or North American countries	29.99%	11.85%	4.51%	2.59%	15.06%	31.33%	2.65%	1.31%	0.71%
Antigua and Barbuda	94.11%	0.31%	0.21%	0.77%	2.74%	0.64%	0.31%	0.42%	0.49%
Other Caribbean countries	67.65%	3.37%	0.42%	2.10%	10.08%	13.27%	1.28%	1.40%	0.42%
Canada	47.21%	28.41%	4.88%	4.28%	12.12%			3.09%	
Other Asian countries	3.61%	5.83%	35.61%		1.42%		7.28%	46.24%	
Other European countries	7.53%	77.84%	1.76%	2.80%	2.12%	0.35%		6.16%	1.43%
Dominica	88.81%	0.09%	0.15%	1.01%	5.89%	0.97%	0.03%	2.67%	0.38%
Dominican Republic	11.84%	0.36%	0.15%	1.21%	3.24%	81.89%	0.05%	0.84%	0.41%
Guyana	78.99%	0.18%	7.58%	1.17%	9.99%	0.03%	0.02%	1.58%	0.45%
Jamaica	94.28%	0.18%	0.43%	0.59%	3.62%	0.02%		0.27%	0.62%
Monsterrat	97.95%	0.52%		0.34%	0.85%			0.17%	0.17%
St. Kitts and Nevis	91.45%	1.19%		2.10%	4.09%	0.29%	0.30%		0.58%
St. Lucia	89.51%	0.35%	1.44%	1.60%	5.99%	0.18%		0.57%	0.35%
St. Vincent and the Grenadines	92.06%	0.17%	0.65%	0.95%	5.05%			0.96%	0.17%
Syria		0.37%	0.37%		0.37%		96.74%	1.78%	0.37%
Trinidad and Tobago	53.85%	4.78%	8.94%	3.01%	24.18%		2.86%	2.16%	0.21%
United Kingdom	39.06%	48.69%	0.39%	5.01%	6.06%			0.52%	0.26%
USA	76.90%	10.18%	2.86%	1.25%	4.46%	0.84%	1.05%	1.97%	0.49%
USVI United States Virgin Islands	96.37%			2.04%	1.32%			0.27%	
Not Stated	60.98%	2.52%	1.78%	0.90%	2.88%	2.46%	0.65%	1.46%	26.38%

=== By age ===
Country of birth (2011)	Age 5 year categories																	
Country of birth (2011)	0-4	5-9	10-14	15-19	20-24	25-29	30-34	35-39	40-44	45-49	50-54	55-59	60-64	65-69	70-74	75-79	80 and over	Total
Africa	4	14	5	14	24	42	36	60	26	15	26	14	3	4	4	2	1	296
Other Latin or North American countries	3	7	12	14	16	17	24	11	20	12	8	6	2	4	2	4	2	165
Antigua and Barbuda	5,723	5,337	5,812	5,092	4,237	3,874	3,925	3,820	3,739	3,563	3,188	2,551	2,140	1,704	1,152	926	1,288	58,071
Other Caribbean countries	21	32	33	25	56	75	59	73	57	75	73	61	47	20	23	19	24	773
Canada	41	42	30	38	40	27	19	21	21	14	12	16	15	4	4	10	1	357
Other Asian countries	5	4	6	17	77	63	40	36	37	45	16	16	9	3	3	4	7	389
Other European countries	10	8	19	8	15	9	16	25	40	43	31	23	22	15	9	9	2	303
Dominica	21	44	81	148	261	366	380	490	590	501	312	142	101	80	49	40	48	3,654
Dominican Republic	11	44	59	89	143	226	288	296	295	251	166	108	60	18	7	8	14	2,083
Guyana	18	102	293	483	535	673	784	801	707	616	473	270	145	74	33	16	15	6,038
Jamaica	19	93	225	393	451	565	575	550	493	449	294	158	71	46	18	15	11	4,427
Monsterrat	2	2	3	28	21	24	27	50	74	64	44	42	45	55	47	42	62	633
St. Kitts and Nevis	1	6	9	3	10	10	13	23	37	38	52	36	40	20	24	19	27	367
St. Lucia	4	19	19	36	34	52	65	70	68	61	55	29	18	28	21	6	11	598
St. Vincent and the Grenadines	2	4	13	23	37	48	56	71	132	102	78	30	36	22	12	3	1	669
Syria	1	-	5	5	18	57	53	46	28	32	16	14	9	6	4	1	1	299
Trinidad and Tobago	8	17	15	18	30	46	33	47	53	66	50	29	38	23	10	9	8	499
United Kingdom	41	64	63	40	33	23	37	45	87	120	85	53	58	44	24	10	18	843
USA	551	500	451	394	266	158	45	34	28	24	32	45	39	16	14	4	7	2,608
USVI United States Virgin Islands	36	43	69	74	60	39	12	26	28	8	3	5	-	1	-	-	1	405
Not Stated	96	72	102	116	123	114	82	93	103	108	75	41	66	42	28	25	56	1,341
Total	6,620	6,455	7,325	7,057	6,488	6,507	6,568	6,688	6,662	6,206	5,090	3,690	2,964	2,231	1,491	1,171	1,603	84,816

== See also ==
- Demographics of Antigua and Barbuda
- List of countries by foreign-born population
