= St. Claire, Antigua and Barbuda =

Coordinates: 17°5′8.66″N 61°48′52.86″W

St. Claire
- Village
- St. Claire in 2026
- Interactive map of the St. Claire main place
- Location within Antigua and Barbuda
- Country: Antigua and Barbuda
- Island: Antigua
- Parish: Saint John

Government
  - Type: Village Council (possibly dissolved)

Population (2011)
  - Total: 898
- Time zone: UTC-4

St. Claire is a village in Saint John Parish, Antigua and Barbuda. It is located in the Major Division of Potters. In 2011, the centre of population of Antigua (excluding Barbuda) was located in the village.

== History ==
=== St. Clare Estate ===
When Dr. Raeburn and his wife built the new stairs to the entrance in the 1930s, it appears that they filled the new stairs with many of the old burial stones that were on the property at the time. The doctor's daughter, Rita Raeburn, said that a copse of enormous old tamarind trees served as a marker for a slave burial place. When she last checked, one marker was still there. The property provides a view of the Allen's (#48), Gillead/Providence/Mills (#189), Bendal's Estate (#37), and McNish Mountain.

This plantation, which used to be known as the Body, was rented out for £900 a year and occasionally "underlet" for £120.

The British Parliament gave the St. Clare estate a legacy award of £10,041 for freeing 62 slaves after slavery was abolished in 1833. Rowland Edward Williams received the prize.

In the 1940s, Dr. Robert Raeburn built a dairy farm with Robert Hall at Smith's (#161) while serving as the island's government vet. They had sizable gardens with a wide variety of trees and plants, including one large, old oak tree that is still there to the west of the original house. The grounds are still roamed by peacocks.

A plaque that reads, "St. Clare originally known as The Body Plantation of Colonel Roland Williams and his heirs from 1680-1842," is located above one of the outbuildings. huge bells similar to these were used to call the laborers when the area was being surveyed by Edward St. Clare in 1772. Mears & Staenbank Founders, London, was commissioned by the estate to manufacture an 18-inch bell in 1860. It still lays in the yard, despite having recently cracked. The majority of plantations featured sizable bells like this one that were used to call in the estate employees.

The Alexander Willock, Esq.-drawn map of the estate was also in the possession of the Raeburn family. It displays the entire layout, including the position of the sugar mill and other structures as well as the number of fields, acres, and roads. John Killean was the surveyor.

== Demographics ==
St. Claire has two enumeration districts.

- 33501 St. Claire_1
- 33502 St. Claire_2

Ethnic
Q48 Ethnic	Counts	%
African descendent	813	90.53%
Caucasian/White	4	0.49%
East Indian/India	12	1.35%
Mixed (Black/White)	7	0.74%
Mixed (Other)	31	3.44%
Hispanic	2	0.25%
Syrian/Lebanese	7	0.74%
Other	3	0.37%
Don't know/Not stated	19	2.09%
Total	898	100.00%

Religion
Q49 Religion	Counts	%
Adventist	145	16.40%
Anglican	130	14.77%
Baptist	31	3.50%
Church of God	31	3.50%
Evangelical	21	2.38%
Jehovah Witness	10	1.13%
Methodist	72	8.14%
Moravian	56	6.38%
Nazarene	18	2.00%
None/no religion	23	2.63%
Pentecostal	85	9.64%
Rastafarian	2	0.25%
Roman Catholic	61	6.88%
Wesleyan Holiness	54	6.13%
Other	84	9.51%
Don't know/Not stated	60	6.76%
Total	882	100.00%
NotApp :	15	

Country of birth
Q58. Country of birth	Counts	%
Africa	3	0.37%
Other Latin or North American countries	2	0.25%
Antigua and Barbuda	568	63.22%
Other Caribbean countries	3	0.37%
Canada	6	0.62%
Other Asian countries	4	0.49%
Other European countries	1	0.12%
Dominica	44	4.92%
Dominican Republic	7	0.74%
Guyana	50	5.54%
Jamaica	89	9.96%
Monsterrat	7	0.74%
St. Kitts and Nevis	1	0.12%
St. Lucia	8	0.86%
St. Vincent and the Grenadines	11	1.23%
Syria	2	0.25%
Trinidad and Tobago	3	0.37%
United Kingdom	11	1.23%
USA	43	4.80%
USVI United States Virgin Islands	1	0.12%
Not Stated	33	3.69%
Total	898	100.00%

Lived Overseas
Q61 Lived Overseas	Counts	%
Yes	117	20.62%
No	443	78.02%
Don't know/Not stated	8	1.36%
Total	568	100.00%
NotApp :	330	

Country of Citizenship
Q71 Country of Citizenship 1	Counts	%
Antigua and Barbuda	725	80.81%
Other Caribbean countries	2	0.25%
Other Asian and Middle Eastern countries	4	0.49%
Dominica	13	1.48%
Dominican Republic	2	0.25%
Guyana	32	3.57%
Jamaica	51	5.66%
Monsterrat	4	0.49%
St. Lucia	1	0.12%
St. Vincent and the Grenadines	4	0.49%
Trinidad and Tobago	2	0.25%
USA	23	2.58%
Other countries	4	0.49%
Not Stated	28	3.08%
Total	898	100.00%

Country of Second/Dual Citizenship
Q71 Country of Citizenship 2 (Country of Second/Dual Citizenship)	Counts	%
Other Caribbean countries	1	0.61%
Canada	7	3.64%
Other Asian and Middle Eastern countries	2	1.21%
Dominica	35	19.39%
Dominican Republic	4	2.42%
Guyana	19	10.30%
Jamaica	36	20.00%
Monsterrat	2	1.21%
St. Lucia	6	3.03%
St. Vincent and the Grenadines	7	3.64%
Trinidad and Tobago	1	0.61%
United Kingdom	24	13.33%
USA	35	19.39%
Other countries	1	0.61%
Not Stated	1	0.61%
Total	182	100.00%
NotApp :	716	
