= Jacks Hill, Antigua and Barbuda =

Coordinates: 17°6′25″N 61°51′39″W

Jacks Hill
- Village
- Jacks Hill in 2026
- Interactive map of the Jacks Hill main place
- Country: Antigua and Barbuda
- Parish: Saint John

Area
  - Total: 2.2 km^{2} (0.85 sq mi)

Population (2011)
  - Total: 1,151

Jacks Hill is a village in Saint John, Antigua and Barbuda. It had a population of 1,151 people in 2011.

== Geography ==
According to the Antigua and Barbuda Statistics Division, the village had a total area of 2.2 square kilometres in 2011.

== Demographics ==
There were 1,151 people living in Jacks Hill as of the 2011 census. The village was 84.64% African, 12.57% Hispanic, 0.86% other mixed, 0.77% some other ethnicity, 0.67% not stated, 0.29% Indian (India), and 0.19% mixed black/white. The population was born in different countries, including 60.84% in Antigua and Barbuda, 10.36% in the Dominican Republic, 7.49% in Guyana, 7.29% in Dominica, 6.72% in Jamaica, and 2.02% in Saint Vincent and the Grenadines. The population had diverse religious affiliations, including 22.78% Pentecostal, 13.90% Anglican, 10.04% Adventist, 9.85% Moravian, and 8.59% irreligious.
