= Art in Antigua and Barbuda =

Art in Antigua and Barbuda began with the Arawak people. The Arawaks produced the oldest works of art in the country, including petroglyphs and pictographs. These artworks, which feature geometric shapes, animals, and vegetation, are believed to have been employed for religious or ceremonial purposes.

When Europeans arrived in Antigua and Barbuda, they brought art traditions such as European painting, sculpture, and pottery. Local artists altered the European style of art to create their own style of Antiguan and Barbudan art. The topics of this art included nature, cultural traditions, and events of the day. In Antigua and Barbuda, there is a significant number of art galleries and studios. Antigua and Barbuda's traditional crafts include sculptures and pottery.
