= Antiguan raisin buns =

Antiguan raisin buns, also known as "bun and cheese" because it is eaten with cheese, is a type of traditional bread from the island of Antigua, in the West Indies. It is a sweet, enriched raisin bread made with ingredients such as sugar, butter, eggs, and sometimes spices like nutmeg. It is typically baked in a round shape, typically eaten with cheese. While eaten year round, it is most popular during Easter.

== Ingredients ==
- Flour
- Instant yeast
- Butter
- Milk
- Raisins
- Brown sugar
- Salt
- Mixed spices
