= Sugar Factory, Antigua and Barbuda =

Coordinates: 17°6′27.83″N 61°47′30.70″W

Sugar Factory
- Village
- Interactive map of the Sugar Factory main place
- Country: Antigua and Barbuda
- Parish: Saint George

Area
  - Total: 5.1 km^{2} (2.0 sq mi)

Population (2011)
  - Total: 1,051

Sugar Factory is a large village in Saint George, Antigua and Barbuda. It had a population of 1,051 in 2011.

== Geography ==
According to the Antigua and Barbuda Statistics Division, the village had a total area of 5.1 square kilometres.

== Demographics ==
There were 1,051 people living in Sugar Factory as of the 2011 census. The population by ethnic groups in the village included: African (91.44%), white (0.30%), East Indian (2.52%), mixed black/white (0.81%), other mixed (3.12%), Hispanic (0.70%), other (0.40%), not stated (0.70%). The population by country of birth groups included: Antigua and Barbuda (72.81%), Guyana (8.16%), United States (4.73%), Jamaica (3.12%), Dominica (2.52%), and the remainder being born in various other, mostly Caribbean countries. The three largest religious denominations in the village were Anglican (14.81%), Moravian (12.17%), Adventist (11.76%), as well as 3.04% being irreligious.
