= Indian Antiguans and Barbudans =

Total population
- 942

Languages
- English, Caribbean Hindustani

Religion
- Hinduism, Christianity (primarily Protestantism)

Related ethnic groups
- Other Indo-Caribbean people

Indian Antiguans and Barbudans are Antiguans and Barbudans of entirely or predominantly Indian descent. In 2011, it was estimated that there were 942 people of Indian descent living in the country, about one percent of the population. The Indian population in the country is almost exclusively concentrated in Saint John. A large portion of the Indian population is of Indo-Guyanese origin. Much of the population works in medicine, technology, and trade. Recent Indian immigration to Antigua and Barbuda has been encouraged through the citizenship by investment program and the establishment of various medical schools throughout Antigua.

== Demographics ==
According to the 2011 census, Indian people make up 1.11% of the population. Most Indians in the country practiced Hinduism, Christianity, with a significant number of irreligious people.
