= Montclear =

- Village
- Interactive map of Montclear
- Coordinates: 17°6′3.6″N 61°51′7.2″W
- Country: Antigua and Barbuda
- Parish: Saint John
- Major Division: All Saints

Area
  - Total: 0.7 km^{2} (0.27 sq mi)

Population (2011)
  - Total: 1,246

Montclear is a village in All Saints Northwest, Saint John, Antigua and Barbuda.

== Geography ==
It has an area of 0.7 square kilometres.

== Demographics ==
Historical population
Year	Pop.	±%
2011	1,246	—

Montclear reported a population of 1,246 in the 2011 census.

=== Districts ===
The village is divided into five enumeration districts:

- 35301 Montclear_1
- 35302 Montclear_2
- 35303 Montclear_3
- 35304 Montclear_4
- 35305 Montclear_5

=== Ethnicity ===
Breakdown of the stated ethnic makeup of Montclear residents, as of the 2011 Census:

Q48 Ethnic	Counts	%
African descendent	1,089	87.41%
Hispanic	99	7.98%
Mixed (Other)	25	2.04%
Mixed (Black/White)	14	1.15%
Caucasian/White	2	0.18%
Syrian/Lebanese	1	0.09%
Other	2	0.18%
Don't know/Not stated	12	0.98%
Total	1,246	100.00%

=== Religion ===
Breakdown of the stated religious affiliations of Montclear residents, as of the 2011 Census:

Religion in Montclear - 2011
Religion	Percent
Pentecostal or other	19.01%
Adventist or other	15.7%
Anglican	10.94%
Church of God or other	7.98%
Evangelical or other	7.17%
Roman Catholic or other	6.28%
Baptist or other	5.83%
Moravian or other	5.2%
Methodist or other	3.23%
Weslyan Holiness or other	2.87%
Nazarene or other	1.61%
Jehovah Witness or other	0.9%
Rastafarian or other	0.36%
Other or other	4.75%
None/Don't Know or other	8.17%

As of 2011, the majority of residents who reported affiliation with a religion, belong Christian denomination.

=== Foreign residents ===
Breakdown of Montclear residents with foreign citizenships, as of the 2011 Census:

Citizenship	Counts	%
Jamaica	73	36.5%
Dominica	43	21.5%
Guyana	30	15%
Dominican Republic	29	14.5%
USA	13	6.5%
United Kingdom	4	2%
Other Caribbean countries	3	1.5%
St. Lucia	3	1.5%
Monsterrat	1	0.5%
Canada	1	0.5%
Total	200	100.00%
