= White Antiguans and Barbudans =

- Distribution of whites

Total population
- 1,398

Languages
- English (majority), Antiguan and Barbudan Creole (plantocracy descendants)

Religion
- Christianity (primarily Roman Catholicism), irreligion, Judaism

White Antiguans and Barbudans are Antiguans and Barbudans of European ancestry. In 2011, it was estimated that there were 1,398 white people living in the country. White people have continuously lived in Antigua and Barbuda since 1632, although the descendants of the old plantocracy have since been outranked on the social hierarchy from wealthy expatriates that operate many of the country's hotels and other businesses.

People in the country of Antiguan and Barbudan ancestry are known as Antiguan and Barbudan Creoles– this group includes people descended from slavery in the islands as well as white people descended from the island's plantocracy.

== History ==
The first confirmed English settlers arrived in Antigua in 1632. These settlers were in constant conflict with the Kalinago, who frequently pillaged their villages such as Falmouth. As more slaves were introduced to Antigua, whites eventually became a minority on the island by the 1680s. Due to contact between the white settlers and the black slaves, a language eventually emerged now known as Antiguan and Barbudan Creole. As the white proportion began to decline, starting in 1700, the Antiguan government made various laws to encourage white settlement. In 1724, the white population of the colony peaked at around 5,200, compared to 19,800 blacks. White people were forbidden from living on Barbuda, unless they were servants to the Codrington family, who owned the island.

Following the establishment of the island's militia, all white men aged fourteen to sixty-five were required to train once a month. In 1736, a conspiracy led by Prince Klaas that wished to kill all white people on the island was discovered and put down. Following this, there was much anxiety among the white population, and the government made further attempts to increase white settlement. This is also when absentee plantation ownership became commonplace, and after this event the white population began to dwindle. By 1821 there were only 1,980 whites on the island. The whites that remained however continued to dominate employment, although a drought in 1834 destroyed much of their prospects following emancipation. While the island continued to rely on sugar until about the 1960s, by 1911 the white population was only 1,015. In 1968, Robert Hall, a white Antiguan, founded the Antigua and Barbuda Democratic Movement, eventually becoming the deputy premier in 1971, and keeping the role until 1976. Following this, he became the country's first leader of the opposition following independence. In 1991, the census determined that the white population had grown to nearly 1,400, with many white expatriates coming to the island to start hotels and businesses. There were also an additional 135 Portuguese people in the country. The population has since stagnated, although in 2011 the Statistics Division began to collect data on a mixed black and white population, that made up an additional 786 people.

== Demographics ==
Largest ethnic groups in Antigua and Barbuda apart from Africans and mixed people

According to the 2011 census, white people make up 1.65% of the country's population. White people are the largest minority group (excluding mixed people) in Saint Mary, Saint Paul, and Saint Philip. White people also make up the majority of the population in settlements such as Long Island, and the plurality of the population in various locations such as Trade Winds and Blue Waters. Most whites are either Catholic (33%), irreligious (23%), or Anglican (14%).

=== Distribution ===
The following table shows the distribution of white people by parish and dependency in 2011:

Parish/dependency	Population	Percentage
St. John's (city)	47	0.22%
Saint John (rural)	665	2.25%
Saint Mary	256	0.97%
Saint George	77	0.39%
Saint Philip	45	1.35%
Saint Paul	285	3.52%
Saint Peter	20	0.39%
Barbuda	2	0.13%
