= Antiguans and Barbudans =

People who are identified with the country of Antigua and Barbuda

Antiguans and Barbudans Aanteegan an' Baabyuudan dem
Total population
- c. 147,000; Diaspora: c. 42,000 (Note: Known citizens only) Map of the Antiguan and Barbudan Diaspora

Regions with significant populations
- Antigua and Barbuda 105,182
- United States: 18,664
- Canada: 4,505
- United Kingdom: 3,891

Languages
- Antiguan and Barbudan Creole, Antiguan and Barbudan English, Antiguan and Barbudan Spanish

Religion
- Christianity (primarily Protestantism)

Antiguans and Barbudans (Antiguan and Barbudan Creole: Aanteegan an' Baabyuudan dem) are the people associated with the country of Antigua and Barbuda. They primarily speak Antiguan and Barbudan Creole and share the same culture. People descended from the country's slave and/or white planter populations are known as Antiguan and Barbudan Creoles. Antiguans and Barbudans are found worldwide, most notably in the United States, Canada, and the United Kingdom. There are about 147,000 Antiguans and Barbudans in total, including about 42,000 in the diaspora. Antigua and Barbuda has been primarily inhabited by African descendants, multiracial people, Europeans since the 17th century, with significant influxes of Hispanic people and other groups during the 20th and 21st centuries. Following associated statehood in 1967, the first major Antiguan and Barbudan migrations outside of the Caribbean took place.

The culture of Antiguans and Barbudans encompasses various forms of music, art, cuisine, oral history, and clothing, many of which have since spread throughout the Caribbean. Internationally, many Antiguans and Barbudans such as writer Jamaica Kincaid and sportsman Viv Richards have been held in high regard, and Antiguan and Barbudan Creole is the majority language in four countries and territories. Most Antiguans and Barbudans are Protestant Christians, and Christianity remains a significant part of most of the people's daily lives.

== History ==
=== Emergence ===
Antigua and Barbuda was first inhabited by the Archaic tribes before 3,600 BC. These people were hunter-gatherers and likely migrated from Central or South America. They were later replaced by the Arawak of Venezuela in about 500 BC. The Kalinago also likely arrived in the archipelago in 1500 AD, and the Amerindians continued to inhabit Antigua and Barbuda in large numbers until the early 1700s. The first European settlers were British, with the first evidence of colonisation being in 1632. The British and Amerindians did not have good relations, with frequent clashes between them resulting in large massacres committed by both sides. The first African slaves arrived in the 1670s, who became the majority by the 1680s.

Linguistically, Antiguan and Barbudan Creole likely emerged in the 1680s when contact was made between speakers of the Kwa languages and a Gullah–Nevis–Antigua language. Antiguan and Barbudan Creole was spoken by both Africans and Europeans during this period, and the language developed into more varieties eventually becoming its modern form by the 19th century. With the mass importations of slaves starting in the early 18th century, a creole identity emerged, causing some conflict between the more-established latter population and the new arrivals.

=== National identity ===
The idea of people on the islands being a distinct nation first emerged in the 1730s with the foundation of the Antiguan independence movement by Prince Klaas. Klaas's foiled plot attracted both creole and Coromantee slaves. At this time, persons from Antigua and persons from Barbuda– Barbudans largely had little contact, although Barbuda had been subordinate to Antigua along with the rest of the British Leeward Islands since its colonisation while functioning as a largely independent political entity. In 1860, Barbuda was officially annexed to Antigua, and over time, more people from the two islands began to interact. In 1951, all Antiguans and Barbudans were for the first time able to democratically govern themselves, and later achieved self-government in 1960; associated statehood in 1967; and independence in 1981.

=== Modern history ===
Since independence in 1981, what it means to be Antiguan or Barbudan has been a major subject of debate. About a third of Antiguans and Barbudans are not descendants of slavery or the plantocracy, and in common discourse, most people not part of this group are usually deemed part of their ancestral nationality only. In terms of geography, there remains a significant cultural divide between the people of the two islands, with Barbudan secessionism remaining a popular idea and major resistance in Barbuda towards large-scale non-Barbudan inhabitation. Anti-Barbudan sentiment in the Antiguan government especially since 2017 has also resulted in a significant cultural divide.

== Ethnic identity ==
Many people in Barbuda will object to using Antiguan as a national denominator due to the significant divide between the two groups and recent political tensions. As Antiguans and Barbudans are a multi-ethnic group of people, ethnicity is not usually a factor in determining who is or is not part of the group. Rather, it is based on one's relationship with the country, and in certain circles, one relationship with the country's colonial past. Subgroups within Antiguans and Barbudans tend to overlap and can be distinguished through geographical location, religion, family heritage, and language.

== Culture ==
Modern Antiguan and Barbudan culture is significantly influenced by West African and European traditions, although there are many characteristics unique to the country. A major diversion between groups of Antiguans and Barbudans is language, with Antiguans and Barbudans primarily using three varieties of Antiguan and Barbudan Creole: North Antiguan, South Antiguan, and Barbudan, each of which only being partially intelligible with one another. Antiguan and Barbudan culture is largely intertwined with rural traditions, and many Antiguans and Barbudans both in the country and in the diaspora are able to identify with one of the country's villages. Antiguans and Barbudans have an indigenous form of music, benna, and have invented various musical instruments such as the banjar. Most Antiguans and Barbudans involve themselves with nationwide Antigua Carnival celebrations or Barbuda Caribana, and much of the population maintains a seafaring identity.

== Statistics ==
There are about 147,000 Antiguans and Barbudans, including 42,000 known citizens within the diaspora. There are also about 150,000 native speakers of Antiguan and Barbudan Creole, many of whom have little to no relationship with the country.

== See also ==
- Antiguan and Barbudan nationality law
- Demographics of Antigua and Barbuda
