= Antiguan and Barbudan Creole people =

Ethnic group

Antiguan and Barbudan Creoles Aawiniega
- Flag of Antigua and Barbuda

Regions with significant populations
- Antigua and Barbuda

Languages
- Antiguan and Barbudan Creole, Antiguan and Barbudan English

Religion
- Christianity (primarily Protestantism)

Related ethnic groups
- Other Antiguans and Barbudans

Antiguan and Barbudan Creoles (Note: also known as Ancestral Antiguans and Barbudans) (Antiguan and Barbudan Creole: Aawiniega) are an ethnic group from Antigua and Barbuda. They are Antiguans and Barbudans of local ancestry, descended from those who lived in the country prior to emancipation in 1834. Antiguan and Barbudan Creoles are not necessarily a mixed ethnic group or racial classification, rather, it is a categorisation used to distinguish people of Antiguan and Barbudan ancestry from those of immigrant origin. "Black creoles" are considered to be those descended from slavery in the country's modern-day borders, and the remaining "white creoles" are mostly descended from the islands' planter population. Most Barbudans and a large portion of Antiguans are considered to be of local ancestry.

A separate creole identity first developed following the mass importations slaves in the early 18th century. The term creole was originally used to refer to people who had assimilated to the dominant way of life in Antigua and Barbuda, including slaves and lower-class white people. Tensions between creoles and new-arrivals were widespread, although many quickly assimilated establishing the modern identity. Following emancipation, many Antiguan and Barbudan Creoles cooperated to establish their own villages, seeking equality in a process termed "creole nationalism" that resulted in the independence of Antigua and Barbuda.

Antiguan and Barbudan Creoles are mostly Protestant Christians. They traditionally speak Antiguan and Barbudan Creole and with the spread of universal education, Antiguan and Barbudan English. Today, most of the creole population lives in rural and suburban areas outside of St. John's, and today form much of the country's middle class. African and European influences continue to define their culture, including in oral history, language, folklore, cuisine, music, and other customs.

== Ethnonyms ==
The term "creole" was originally used to distinguish slaves who had already been in the islands for some time from new arrivals. White settlers who had established the islands as their permanent home were also known as creoles. In Antiguan and Barbudan Creole, the endonym of the group is Aawiniega, literally translating to "our people"– niega being derived from the English word "negro", which eventually became the word for all people.

== History ==
The first African slaves were taken by Thomas Warner from Saint Kitts to Antigua in 1632 when the island was first colonised by the British. In the early 17th century, the society was composed of wealthy Europeans, their lower-class white servants, and some African slaves. Antigua at this time had a population of less than 1,000. As most of the lower-class white population were servants, they were the segment of the population who made the most contact with the African population. Many of these servants came from England, Scotland, and Ireland, although many came from Suriname and Barbados. The slaves and servants were primarily occupied with agricultural tasks on small estates. Barbuda was inhabited by a small population of white planters who were nearly wiped out by a Kalinago attack. By 1672, 41.6% of the population of Antigua was of African descent. During this time, a Gullah–Nevis–Antigua pidgin was spoken on the island.

In the 1670s, sugar cultivation began on Antigua. This resulted in large quantities of slaves being imported to staff these new plantations. In the six years between 1672 and 1678, the Antiguan population increased from 1,370 to 4,480, with Europeans still making up a slight majority. Due to the need for communication between Gullah–Nevis–Antigua speakers and the newly arrived slaves from Africa, an Antiguan and Barbudan Pidgin developed– which eventually became the modern Antiguan and Barbudan Creole language as people began to speak it natively. In the 1680s, Barbuda was purchased by the Codrington family, with nearly all Barbudans being descended from a shipment of slaves that came from Ghana. By then, a distinct creole identity had developed on Antigua. Hostility existed between the new arrivals and the creoles, especially with Coromantee slaves who wished to maintain their cultural identity. They also wished to maintain their own religion. However, both creoles and new-arrivals cooperated in Prince Klaas's foiled plot to establish an African-ruled kingdom on the island.

Following the abolition of slavery in 1834, the formerly enslaved population began to establish some of Antigua's modern villages. As plantation owners did not want to rebuild destroyed workers' accommodations following the earthquake in 1843, these villages eventually became home to the majority of the islands' population. However, the population was still dominated by the planter population (white creoles), who now controlled the colonial government and most economic activity. Most former slaves had no choice but to continue to work on these plantations for low wages. Many of these people wished for a peasant-dominated society, although the interests of the urban population ultimately prevailed. The labour riots of 1939 and the establishment of the Antigua Trades and Labour Union advocated for Fabianism, better economic conditions, and Pan-Africanism– described as "creole nationalism" by Anthony Bogues. The members of the plantocracy were unable to foster an economic transition away from agriculture, and it was eventually the colonial government who was forced to seek foreign investment. This creole nationalist ideology eventually resulted in universal suffrage in 1951, associated statehood in 1967, and independence in 1981.

Large scale immigration eventually resulted in a major demographic change in Antigua and Barbuda. The creole population, once at the bottom of the social hierarchy, eventually became the bulk of the country's middle class, with immigrants from Guyana, Jamaica, Dominica, and the Dominican Republic taking their place. The white creole population eventually became a small portion of the upper class, with the remaining descendants of the plantocracy benefitting from land and business ownership– albeit still outranked by a new white expatriate population from developed western countries. Today, Antigua and Barbuda has the highest proportion of immigrants of any independent country in the western hemisphere– with 30% of the country being born abroad as of 2011.

== Language ==
One of the distinguishing features of the creole population in Antigua and Barbuda is their language. Spoken mostly by African descendant people as well as some lower-class white people, Antiguan and Barbudan Creole is the most spoken native language in the country. A 2011 estimate found that 57.06% of people in the country spoke North Antiguan Creole, 8.05% spoke South Antiguan Creole, 1.71% spoke Barbudan Creole, and 0.67% spoke an unknown variety of the language. A dialect of English is also spoken by the population, and today most people code switch between the creole language and standard English.

== Culture ==
Antiguan and Barbudan Creole culture is a mixture of West African and European traditions. Protestant Christianity has always been the dominant religion on the islands, although African influence does exist in the country's folklore– seen in superstitions such as jumbies. Obeah is a healing tradition that was used from the introduction of slavery to the islands until the post-emancipation period. Much of the country's cuisine is also of African origin, including ducana and fungee. Benna is a music genre indigenous to Antigua, although calypso and soca have since become more popular. Many creole proverbs were descended from African languages. Pottery is important to Antiguan and Barbudan culture, especially in Sea View Farm and Potters Village which was named after it– Antiguan and Barbudan art also has some European influence.

Antigua and Barbuda is one of the most rural countries in the world. Only 24% of the population lives in an urban area, and the country has a growing rural population. One of the most important aspects of Antiguan and Barbudan identity is village origin. After emancipation, African descendants cooperated to build free villages, many of them being named after the ideals of freedom– such as Liberta, Freemans, and Freetown.
