= Languages of Antigua and Barbuda =

- Recognised: Antiguan and Barbudan English, Spanish
- Vernacular: Antiguan and Barbudan Creole
- Immigrant: Spanish, other creoles

The primary language spoken by the population of Antigua and Barbuda is Antiguan and Barbudan Creole. In Antigua and Barbuda, neither the constitution nor an Act of Parliament establishes an official language. English is the language of academic communication, and due to its widespread usage, it is considered the country's working language. Nearly all of the population is fluent in English. On 14 May 2026, Cabinet designated Spanish as an official language.

== Antiguan and Barbudan Creole ==
Creole dialects in Antigua and Barbuda

Antiguan and Barbudan Creole is the primary language spoken in the country. There are three primary dialects of the language in the country. The north Antiguan dialect, the south Antiguan dialect, and the Barbudan dialect. Antiguan and Barbudan Creole is natively spoken in most of the former British Leeward Islands. The south Antiguan dialect is only semi-intelligible with the rest of the Antiguan and Barbudan Creole dialects, primarily being spoken in Saint Mary and Swetes in Saint Paul. Barbudan Creole tends to be more distant from Antiguan Creole than the closer Montserrat Creole. While the language is widely spoken throughout the country and the rest of the Leeward Islands, attitudes towards it remain negative.

The language also tends to have an urban-rural divide. As more Antiguans commute into St. John's, this divide has begun to disappear however, resulting in the emergence of the northern and southern dialects in the 1960s. Until the early 1960s, the dialects were largely based on the villages, and researchers noted that Antigua's inhabitants were able to identify what village someone resided in based on their speech patterns. Speakers of the northern dialect tend to view their dialect as the "standard dialect". Antiguan and Barbudan Creole is more openly spoken by the lower and middle classes, while the upper classes tend to prefer standard English in public settings.

== English ==
regions where any dialect of English is the language of the majority

English is spoken as a second language by the vast majority of the population, and is the unofficial language of academic communication. It is considered the country's de facto working language, and 6.12% of the population speaks it as their primary language. The only non-trivial mentions of the English language in Antiguan and Barbudan primary legislation are in section 17 of the Constitution, where it is stated that any person detained must be furnished with a written statement in English and in their native language, and in sections 29 and 38 where it is stated that all members of parliament must be capable of reading the English language unless incapacitated by blindness. In section 8 of the Standing Orders of the House of Representatives, it is also stated that the only language that may be used in parliamentary proceedings is English, although an acrolectal form of Antiguan and Barbudan Creole is frequently spoken in parliament during intense debates.

== Spanish ==
There were 2,083 Spanish speakers in the country as of 2011. The largest dialect of Spanish spoken in the country is Dominican Spanish, since people born in the Dominican Republic are the fifth largest immigrant group making up about 2.5% of the population in 2011. As of May 2026, Spanish has been adopted as the second official language to improve economic ties with Latin America as well as improving ties with the country's Dominican community.

== Amerindian languages ==
There are no documented indigenous languages spoken in Antigua and Barbuda today. The first people on the islands, the Archaic people, spoke an unknown language. The Taíno (commonly referred to as the Arawak) spoke the eastern dialect of the Taíno language. The Taíno called Antigua Yarumaqui. The Taíno inhabited the island during the Ceramic and post-Saladoid periods. The Kalinago arrived during the post-Saladoid period and spoke the Kalinago language. The Kalinago called Antigua Wa'ladli (along with the Kalinago exonym Warikad used in Dominica), Barbuda Wa'omoni, and Redonda Ocananmanrou.

== Other foreign languages ==
Other major immigrant languages include Guyanese Creole, Jamaican Patois, and Dominican Creole French of Dominica. These countries, excluding Dominica, are also the largest origin locations of undocumented migrants. Excluding Dominican Creole French, these languages have also had an impact on the vocabulary of Antiguan and Barbudan Creole. 7.12% of the Antiguan and Barbudan population was born in Guyana, 5.22% in Jamaica, and 4.31% in Dominica. Jamaican Patois has had the largest impact on the island's vocabulary, especially on its younger population. There are also about 1,200 possible speakers of Portuguese and 400 total speakers of North Levantine Arabic, especially in communities with significant Christian Arab populations like Radio Range. Due to the proximity of French-speaking islands like Guadeloupe, standard French is also a common elective language taken in schools.

== Statistics ==
As of 2011, the main languages of the population are estimated to be as follows: North Antiguan Creole (57.06%), South Antiguan Creole (8.05%), Guyanese Creole (7.11%), standard English (6.12%), Jamaican Creole (5.21%), Dominican Creole English (4.2%), some other language (3.53%), Spanish (2.45%), Barbudan Creole (1.71%), Vincentian Creole (0.78%), Montserratian Creole (0.74%), Saint Lucian Creole (0.71%), an unknown variety of Antiguan and Barbudan Creole (0.67%), Trinidad/Tobago Creole (0.58%), Virgin Islands Creole (0.47%), Saint Kitts Creole (0.43%), and Dominican Creole French (0.1%). While only about 6.12% of the population speaks standard English as their main language, nearly the entire population can fluently speak it. This data only accounts for main languages and not multilingualism.
