= List of countries and territories where English is an official language =

English language distribution Majority native language Official or administrative language, but not majority language

The following is a list of countries and territories where English is an official language used in citizen interactions with government officials. As of 2026, there are 57 sovereign states and 28 non-sovereign entities where English is an official language. Many administrative divisions have declared English an official language at the local or regional level.

Most states where English is an official language are former territories of the British Empire. Exceptions include Rwanda and Burundi, which were formerly German and then Belgian colonies; Cameroon, where only part of the country was under the British mandate; and Liberia, the Philippines, the Federated States of Micronesia, the Marshall Islands, and Palau, which were American territories. English is the sole official language of the Commonwealth of Nations and of the Association of Southeast Asian Nations (ASEAN). English is one of the official languages of the United Nations, the European Union, the African Union, the Organisation of Islamic Cooperation, the Caribbean Community, the Union of South American Nations, and many other international organisations.

The United Kingdom, Australia, Antigua and Barbuda, and the United States (Note: In the United States of America, English is the working language of the federal government, but there is no statutory official language. Executive Order 14224 of 2025, declaring English official, is recognised by federal agencies. Thirty-two states recognize English as official by law. See also Languages of the United States.) do not have English as a de jure official language, but it is the de facto working language for their governments.

== Sovereign states ==
=== English is a de jure official language ===
Country	ISO code	Geographic region	Population (Note: The population figures are based on the sources in List of countries by population, with information as of 23 January 2009 (UN estimates, et al.), and refer to the population of the country and not necessarily to the number of inhabitants that speak English in the country in question.)	Primary language?
The Bahamas	BHS	Caribbean	403,680	Yes (English-based creole)
Barbados	BRB	Caribbean	282,682	Yes (English-based creole)
Belize	BLZ	Central America	288,000	Yes (English-based creole)
Botswana	BWA	Africa	2,549,207	Yes
Burundi	BDI	Africa	10,114,505	No (Kirundi)
Cameroon	CMR	Africa	22,534,532	No (co-official with French, primary only in the Northwest Region and Southwest Region)
Canada	CAN	North America	40,267,385	Yes (co-official with French)
Dominica	DMA	Caribbean	65,744	No (French-based creole)
Eswatini	SWZ	Africa	1,141,000	No (Swazi)
Fiji	FJI	Oceania	828,000	Yes (used as lingua franca)
The Gambia	GMB	Africa	1,709,000	Yes
Ghana	GHA	Africa	35,297,060	Yes (used as lingua franca)
Grenada	GRD	Caribbean	111,000	Yes (English-based creole)
Guyana	GUY	South America	738,000	Yes (English-based creole)
India	IND	Asia	1,468,675,319	No (designated as official working language. Used in government, education, and business) but often serves as a Lingua Franca
Ireland	IRL	Europe	5,327,721	Yes (Irish is co-official)
Jamaica	JAM	Caribbean	2,714,000	Yes (English-based creole)
Kenya	KEN	Africa	57,927,713	Yes (used in business and education)
Kiribati	KIR	Oceania	95,000	No (Gilbertese)
Lesotho	LSO	Africa	2,008,000	No (Sesotho)
Liberia	LBR	Africa	3,750,000	Yes
Malawi	MWI	Africa	16,407,000	Yes (lingua franca)
Malta	MLT	Europe	537,000	Yes (co-official with Maltese)
Marshall Islands	MHL	Oceania	59,000	No (Marshallese)
Micronesia	FSM	Oceania	110,000	Yes
Namibia	NAM	Africa	2,074,000	No (lingua franca)
Nauru	NRO	Oceania	10,000	No (but widely spoken)
New Zealand	NZL	Oceania	5,361,000	Yes (co-official with Māori & New Zealand Sign Language)
Nigeria	NGA	Africa	241,125,000	Yes (used as official language)
Pakistan	PAK	Asia	256,660,152	No (but official and educational)
Palau	PLW	Oceania	20,000	No (Palauan)
Papua New Guinea	PNG	Oceania	7,059,653	Yes (official and educational)
Philippines	PHL	Asia	110,864,327	Yes (co-official with Filipino)
Rwanda	RWA	Africa	13,240,439	No (but used in business and education)
Saint Kitts and Nevis	KNA	Caribbean	50,000	Yes (English-based creole)
Saint Lucia	LCA	Caribbean	165,000	No (French-based creole)
Saint Vincent and the Grenadines	VCT	Caribbean	120,000	Yes (English-based creole)
Samoa	WSM	Oceania	188,000	No (Samoan)
Seychelles	SYC	Africa / Indian Ocean	87,000	No (French-based creole)
Sierra Leone	SLE	Africa	6,190,280	Yes (English-based creole)
Singapore	SGP	Asia	5,469,700	Yes (lingua franca)
Solomon Islands	SLB	Oceania	507,000	Yes
South Africa	ZAF	Africa	65,019,298	Yes (official, educational and lingua franca in formal economy)
South Sudan	SSD	Africa	12,340,000	Yes
Sudan	SDN	Africa	40,235,000	No (co-official with Arabic)
Tanzania	TZA	Africa	51,820,000	No (Swahili)
Tonga	TON	Oceania	100,000	No (Tongan)
Trinidad and Tobago	TTO	Caribbean	1,333,000	Yes (English-based creoles)
Tuvalu	TUV	Oceania	11,000	No (Tuvaluan)
Uganda	UGA	Africa	47,053,690	Yes
Vanuatu	VUT	Oceania	226,000	Yes (English-based creole)
Zambia	ZMB	Africa	16,212,000	Yes (lingua franca)
Zimbabwe	ZWE	Africa	15,178,957	Yes (lingua franca)

=== English is a predominant language without de jure designation as official ===
In these countries, English is conventionally spoken by both the government and main population, despite it having no de jure official status at national level.

Country	ISO code	Geographic region	Population	Primary language?
Antigua and Barbuda	ATG	Caribbean	85,000	Yes (English-based creole)
Australia	AUS	Oceania	26,461,166	Yes
United Kingdom	GBR	Europe	68,138,484	Yes
United States	USA	North America	339,665,118	Yes

=== English is a de facto working language ===
While English is not recognised as de jure official in these countries, it is used as a working language in administration and many professional sectors, as well as being a primary language in the education system.

Country	ISO code	Geographic region	Population
Bangladesh	BAN	Asia	169,828,911
Brunei	BRN	Asia	440,715
Burkina Faso	BFA	Africa	24,736,828
Eritrea	ERI	Africa	6,234,000
Israel	ISR	Asia / Middle East	8,051,200
Malaysia	MYS	Asia	32,730,000
Mauritius	MUS	Africa / Indian Ocean	1,262,000
Sri Lanka	LKA	Asia	20,277,597
Timor-Leste	TLS	Asia	1,340,513
United Arab Emirates	ARE	Asia / Middle East	9,809,000

== Non-sovereign entities ==
=== English is a de jure official language ===
Entity	Sovereign state	Region	Population	Primary language?
Akrotiri and Dhekelia	United Kingdom	Europe	15,700	No (Greek)
American Samoa (Note: American Samoa is an unincorporated U.S. territory.)	United States	Oceania	67,700	No (Samoan)
Anguilla	United Kingdom	Caribbean	18,090	Yes (English-based creole)
Bermuda (Note: Bermuda is a British Overseas Territory.)	United Kingdom	North Atlantic	65,000	Yes
Cayman Islands	United Kingdom	Caribbean	47,000	Yes (English-based creole)
Cook Islands (Note: The Cook Islands and Niue are associated states of New Zealand that lack general recognition.)	New Zealand	Oceania	20,000	No (Māori)
Curaçao	Netherlands	Caribbean	150,563	No (Portuguese-based creole)
Falkland Islands and South Georgia	United Kingdom	South America	3,000	Yes
Gibraltar	United Kingdom	Europe	33,000	Yes
Guam (Note: Guam is an organized unincorporated territory of the United States)	United States	Oceania	173,000	Yes (co-official with Chamorro)
Hong Kong (Note: Hong Kong is a former British Crown colony (1843–1981) and British Dependent Territory (1981–1997); it is currently a Special Administrative Region of the People's Republic of China (1997–present).)	China	Asia	7,097,600	No (co-official with Chinese)
Isle of Man (Note: The Isle of Man is a British Crown dependency.)	United Kingdom	Europe	80,058	Yes
Jersey (Note: Jersey is a British Crown dependency.)	United Kingdom	Europe	89,300	Yes
Niue	New Zealand	Oceania	1,600	No (Niuean)
Norfolk Island	Australia	Oceania	1,828	Yes (English-based creole)
Northern Mariana Islands (Note: The Northern Mariana Islands is a commonwealth in political union with the United States.)	United States	Oceania	53,883	Yes (co-official with Chamorro)
Pitcairn Islands (Note: Pitcairn Islands is a British Overseas Territory.)	United Kingdom	Oceania	50	Yes (English-based creole)
Puerto Rico (Note: Puerto Rico is, historically and culturally, connected to the Spanish-speaking Caribbean; Spanish is also an official language on the island. Puerto Rico is an unincorporated United States territory referred to as a "Commonwealth".)	United States	Caribbean	3,991,000	No (co-official with Spanish as the primary language)
Sint Maarten	Netherlands	Caribbean	40,900	Yes
Turks and Caicos Islands	United Kingdom	North Atlantic	26,000	Yes (English-based creole)
United States Virgin Islands (Note: The US Virgin Islands is an insular area of the United States.)	United States	Caribbean	111,000	Yes (English-based creole)
Virgin Islands, British	United Kingdom	Caribbean	23,000	Yes (English-based creole)

=== English is a de facto official language ===
Entity	Sovereign state	Region	Population
British Indian Ocean Territory	United Kingdom	Indian Ocean	3,000
Guernsey (Note: Guernsey is a British Crown dependency.)	United Kingdom	Europe	61,811
Montserrat	United Kingdom	Caribbean	5,900
Saint Helena, Ascension and Tristan da Cunha	United Kingdom	South Atlantic	5,660

=== English is a de facto official, but not a primary language ===
Entity	Sovereign state	Region	Population
Christmas Island (Note: Christmas Island is an external territory of Australia.)	Australia	Southeast Asia	1,508
Cocos (Keeling) Islands (Note: Cocos (Keeling) Islands is an external territory of Australia.)	Australia	Southeast Asia	596
Tokelau	New Zealand	Oceania	1,400

== Country subdivisions ==
In these country subdivisions, English has de jure official status, but English is not official in their respective countries at the national level.

Country subdivisions where English is a de jure official language
Subdivision	Country	Region	Population
San Andrés y Providencia	Colombia	South America	75,167
Sarawak	Malaysia	Asia	2,471,140
Saba	Netherlands	Caribbean	1,991
Sint Eustatius	Netherlands	Caribbean	3,897
Scotland	United Kingdom	Europe	5,424,800
Wales	United Kingdom	Europe	3,125,000

=== U.S. states ===
As of 2025, 32 out of the 50 states of the United States have designated English as their official language.

U.S. states where English is a de jure official language
Subdivision	Region	Population
Alabama	North America	4,833,722
Alaska	North America	735,132
Arizona	North America	6,626,624
Arkansas	North America	2,959,373
California	North America	38,332,521
Colorado	North America	5,268,367
Florida	North America	21,299,325
Georgia	North America	10,519,475
Hawaii	Oceania	1,404,054
Idaho	North America	1,612,136
Illinois	North America	12,882,135
Indiana	North America	6,570,902
Iowa	North America	3,090,416
Kansas	North America	2,893,957
Kentucky	North America	4,395,295
Louisiana	North America	4,657,757
Massachusetts	North America	6,794,422
Mississippi	North America	2,991,207
Missouri	North America	6,083,672
Montana	North America	1,015,165
Nebraska	North America	1,868,516
New Hampshire	North America	1,323,459
North Carolina	North America	9,848,060
North Dakota	North America	723,393
Oklahoma	North America	3,850,568
South Carolina	North America	4,774,839
South Dakota	North America	844,877
Tennessee	North America	6,495,978
Utah	North America	2,900,872
Virginia	North America	8,260,405
West Virginia	North America	1,844,128
Wyoming	North America	582,658

== See also ==
- Anglosphere
- English-only movement
- Anglo-America
- Commonwealth of Nations
  - Member states of the Commonwealth of Nations
- British Overseas Territories
- English-speaking world
- World Englishes
- English-based creole languages
- List of countries by English-speaking population
- List of languages by total number of speakers
- British Empire
- List of link languages
- Geolinguistics
- Language geography

== Footnotes ==
By ISO 639-3 code
Enter an ISO code to find the corresponding language article.
