= Afro-Dominicans (Dominica) =

Total population
- 61,838; 86.8% of the Dominican population (2001)

Languages
- English · Dominican Creole French

Religion
- Predominantly Roman Catholicism, minority Protestantism

Related ethnic groups
- African people · Other Afro-Caribbeans · English people · French people

Afro-Dominicans are Dominicans of African descent and the majority of the Commonwealth of Dominica's population.

== Origins ==
Africans were initially brought to Dominica through the slave trade. Colonial records indicate multiple countries of origin for the slaves. The records contain data on slave ship ports of embarkation, often the ethnic group of the slaves, the date of arrival in Dominica, the number of enslaved people on board and survival rates, and the boat's name. Based on these records, the majority of African slaves came from the Bight of Biafra, of present-day south-eastern Nigeria (Igbo, Ibibio) and coastal Cameroon, comprising 62% of the 57,000 slaves imported to Dominica.

Other slaves were from Senegal, Gambia, Sierra Leone (4.8%), Windward Coast (11%), Liberia particularly people of the Bassa's of the Kru ethnic group, Ghana (3%, Akan,) Benin (1%), the Popo Kingdom, Congo-Brazzaville (Loango Kingdom (82 individuals), Angola (Ambundu) and Southeast of Africa (670 individuals), the Congo and Angola (6.7%). Other slaves in Dominica belonged to the Yoruba, Ewe, Fula, Kongo and Wolof ethnic groups.

The word "Kwéyòl" designates that Creole dialect of Dominica.

== History ==
Prior to the 1760s, Dominica remained a less attractive destination for the transatlantic slave trade, overshadowed by prosperous sugar-producing islands sugar islands like Barbados, Antigua, St. Kitts, Guadeloupe and Martinique. Most enslaved individuals who arrived in early Dominica were Caribbean-born, having been redistributed from established trading hubs rather than transported directly from Africa. Under French control, Dominica operated according to Louis XVI’s Code Noir of 1685, a legal framework that codified the status and treatment of enslaved persons. By 1745, Dominica’s population had grown to 3,032 with enslaved individuals making up the majority.

During British rule of Dominica, at least 100,000 slaves were brought to the island, 40,000 of whom arrived between 1763 and 1778. As of the 1760s, 10,551 slaves were imported. Many of the slaves brought to Dominica were traded with growers on Guadeloupe, Martinique and St. Lucia. With the French reoccupation of the island between 1778 and mid-May 1783, only one slave ship in late 1781 arrived in Dominica. After the British reoccupation between May 1783 and late 1789, the slave trade resumed and 38,328 new slaves were brought to Dominica. In the 1790s, 11,776 more slaves arrived. The large number of slaves in Dominica in 1795 prompted a slave rebellion, influenced by the Haitian Revolution, called Colihault Uprising. The revolt was not successful and in the first eight years of the 19th century, 7,734 more African slaves arrived in Dominica.

Because of their large quantity and poor treatment, the number of Maroons and runaway slaves increased through time. These ex-slaves were armed and led a rebellion against the British in 1785 and 1786. The rebellion was not successful and the leaders were imprisoned or executed. The conflicts between the Maroons and the British reoccurred several times, persisting until 1815.

In 1831, though slavery continued, the Brown's Act conferred political and social rights to free Afro-Dominicans. In 1832, three coloured men were elected to the House Dominican legislative Assembly. On August 1, 1834, the Abolition of Slavery, passed by the British Parliament a year earlier, was put into effect in Dominica. In 1838 there was a coloured majority in the chamber. Dominica became the first British colony in the Caribbean with a legislature controlled by coloured people. Moreover, most coloured legislators were small land holders or merchants whose economic and social views were opposed to the interests of wealthy English landowners. The English landowners lobbied for more direct British control, while the coloured lawmakers advocated for laws to promote the welfare of the former slaves. The differing interests caused an increase in internal political instability resulting in clashes between ex-slaves and settlers. In 1844, freed slaves, joining with the Kalinago people, rebelled against their former owners.

In 1865, the British colonial authority replaced the elected assembly, composed of half elected and half appointed members. In 1871, Dominica became part of the Leeward Islands and the power of the African population declined. In 1896, the colonial government was restored and restricted the political rights of the African population. Development aid, offered as compensation for disenfranchisement, proved to have negligible effects.

== Demography ==
According to Dominica's 2001 Census, people of African descent make up 86.8% of the population, while people of mixed race make up 8.9%. In total, the Afro-Dominicans are 95.7% of the population. Most Dominicans speak English, although there are some communities that speak Creole French and Kokoy which is a mix of Antiguan and Barbudan Creole and Dominican Creole French. The Kokoy dialect arrived in Dominica in the 19th century, with immigrants from Antigua and Montserrat. The Dominican population is mostly Catholic with a Protestant minority.

=== Genetics ===
===== Autosomal DNA =====
In addition to being found to have 16.2% (±10.4%) Native American and 28.1% (±12.3%) European ancestry, Afro-Dominicans, who were sampled in 2013, were found to be 55.6% (±16.1%) West African.

== Cultural contributions ==
African contributions to Dominican language and culture are reflected in the dance, music, food, clothing, religion and the use of herbs and medicinal plants, including:

- Language: The African influence is recorded in words, syntax, and sentence construction. Many words incorporated into French Creole from Dominica are of African origin, and useful in tracing some slave origins. These words are of Yoruba, Ewe, Igbo, Akan, Fula, Kongo and Wolof origin.
- Dance: Several types of Dominican dance derive from West Africa such as the Bélé.
- Music: Influence in the musical folklore of Dominica are noteworthy such as the frequent use of drums and African rhythms in dances and music. For example, the Creole "Lavway" is a type of music based on call and response. The "Lavway" were sung on ships that brought the enslaved Africans to Dominica. Today, Lavway are used in Bélé, Carnival songs, work, and in Wood constructions.
- Food: Among the African foods of the island are yams, accras, and "one pot hold all".
- Dress: Dress reflecting African origin includes the use of gold chains, jewelry, and in the case of men, ornaments made with massif gold. The Douillette, an ornamented garment that conveys social status has a clear African origin.
- Spiritualism: Animism is common in Dominica. This religious practice was adapted to Christianity and important in funerals, "nine night" wakes, and the annual Fete La Toussaint when the souls of the dead are remembered.
- Plants and herbal medicines: Dominican Africans use tropical plants in many different ways including for tea, bath and poultices and as amulets to ward off evil.
