= Antiguan and Barbudan Pidgin =

Extinct pidgin spoken in the Leeward Islands

- Region: British Leeward Islands
- Era: developed into Antiguan and Barbudan Creole in the late 17th century and early 18th century
- Language family: English-based pidgin: Antiguan and Barbudan Pidgin

Language codes
- ISO 639-3: –

Antiguan and Barbudan Pidgin (ABP) was a pidgin language descended from contact between Antiguan and Barbudan English, existing Gullah–Nevis–Antigua dialects on the island, and Kwa languages in the 1670s and 1680s. The language is the ancestor of modern Antiguan and Barbudan Creole and had no native speakers– the language had several dialects in constant contact. Some theorize that ABP actually originated on Saint Kitts, before spreading to the rest of the British Leeward Islands. Kokoy is the only variety of Antiguan and Barbudan Creole that was not directly descended from this language– instead, it was descended from contact between North Antiguan and the Montserratian dialects. Antiguan and Barbudan Pidgin is the modern name of this language– the language had many endonyms.

The pidgin came from early creole speaking slaves and Antiguan and Barbudan English speakers attempting to communicate with speakers of the Kwa languages on sugar plantations. Every sugar plantation had a slightly different form of the pidgin. During the 1680s up to the 1700s, the pidgin underwent the process of creolization as it acquired native speakers. All other creole languages go through this process. The pidgin was succeeded by Old Antiguan and Barbudan Creole– ABP and Old Antiguan and Barbudan coexisted for several years– the children of the pidgin speakers spoke Old Antiguan and Barbudan and the parents spoke the pidgin.
