= Antiguan Maroons =

Community founded by escaped slaves

Regions with significant populations
- Antigua and Barbuda

Languages
- South Antiguan Creole

Religion
- Christianity

Related ethnic groups
- Other Antiguans and Barbudans, Maroon people, Kalinago

The Antiguan Maroons were a group of escaped Afro-Antiguan slaves who settled in the Shekerley Mountains of Saint Mary and Saint Paul parishes. It is also believed that some may have fled to other islands with high Kalinago populations. They were an agricultural population that worked on small plots of land in the "harsh" forests. Many of the maroons were centralized in a single camp. It is believed that the population faltered so quickly due to the relative accessibility and small size of the mountain range.

The Antiguan Maroons inhabited the Round South linguistic area which spoke South Antiguan Creole, a basilectal language influenced by Sranan Tongo due Willoughbyland exiles in the 1660s.

Due to the small population of white Antiguans, fear of slave revolts emerged among this population starting in the seventeenth century, which reflected in early colonial legislation. In 1669, maroonage became a crime punishable by death, however it was not until 1680 that comprehensive anti-Maroon legislation was adopted by the colony.

== History ==
The Antiguan Maroons were known to pillage the various sugar plantations on the island and then quickly escape to the mountains. In 1680, a law was passed making any absence of a slave from their plantation lasting longer than a month a felony.

The first known expedition to exterminate the population took place in 1686, when Captain Carden was instructed to pursue "40 or 50 runaway slaves in the Mountains".

In 1687, it is believed that the maroons plotted the only slave revolt in the seventeenth century British Leeward Islands.

In February 1687, the Antiguan government formed a committee to investigate the revolt claims, which published weekly reports in the situation. Carden was also ordered to send small units into the hills. On 9 March 1687, a report was published on the main Maroon camp claiming that there were forty to fifty maroons living there in twenty homes, and that some of the men were armed. It was also claimed that the Maroon community recruited agents to raid the plantations.

On 17 March 1687, a raid of Carden's was publicized in which several whites and one maroon were injured, and the leader of the maroons was killed. This is considered to have decimated the population, with the remaining maroons escaping to other parts of the region. By 24 March, the legislature instituted a mandatory death penalty for the remaining ~27 maroons. Plantations were required to share with the government detailed lists of all missing slaves.

In 1723, the colonial legislature renewed policies to reward to white men who either killed or captured Antiguan Maroons.

== Demographics ==
Following the raid of March 1687, it is believed that there were twenty-seven remaining maroons– seventeen males and ten females. By this time, the group may have been dispersed given the collapse of the main settlement.
