= Varieties of Antiguan and Barbudan Creole =

Group of local language varieties

Antiguan and Barbudan Creole
- Leeward Caribbean Creole English
- Native to: Leeward Islands: Antigua and Barbuda; Anguilla; Dominica; Montserrat; Saint Kitts and Nevis
- Language family: English Creole: Atlantic; Eastern; Southern; Northern Antilles; Antiguan and Barbudan Creole
- Early form: Antiguan and Barbudan Pidgin

Language codes
- ISO 639-3: aig
- Glottolog: anti1245
- Linguasphere: to -apm 52-ABB-apf to -apm
- Primary branches of Antiguan and Barbudan Creole: North Antiguan South Antiguan Barbudan Montserratian Saint Kitts Anguillan Kokoy

There are several varieties of Antiguan and Barbudan Creole (Note: Alternately known as Leeward Caribbean Creole English in linguistics) forming a branch of the Eastern Caribbean Creole, many of which are only partially mutually intelligible. Variation is strongest in the mountainous regions of southwestern Antigua. The varieties are classified into seven main groups: North Antiguan, South Antiguan, Barbudan, Saint Kitts, Anguillan, Montserratian, and Kokoy.

== Classification ==
Antiguan and Barbudan Creole forms a dialect continuum, with varieties tending to become less mutually intelligible by distance.

North Antiguan Creole
This variety has the most speakers and is considered the standard variety of Antiguan and Barbudan Creole. It originated in the city of St. John's and has spread throughout northern Antigua due to the number of people who commute to the city. The variety has about 48,000 native speakers in Antigua and Barbuda. It is most similar to Montserrat Creole.
South Antiguan Creole
This variety is the most distant from the other creoles and is only partially mutually intelligible with the other varieties. It is spoken in the "Round South" region of Antigua near the Shekerley Mountains, having more African influence and different pronouns from the rest of the language. The dialect is mostly spoken by older generations.
Barbudan Creole
Due to Barbuda's cultural isolation from the rest of the Leeward Islands, Barbudan Creole is largely considered to have developed separately from the others and is most influenced by the Fante dialect of Akan.
Saint Kitts Creole
Spoken throughout the country of Saint Kitts and Nevis. Mesolectal forms are used by most speakers, with speakers in the Capesterre region using a basilectal form. Grammar is similar to North Antiguan, although the variety has a distinct vocabulary.
Anguillan Creole
This variety is distant from the other varieties both geographically and linguistically. The variety has significant influence from Virgin Islands Creole due to its proximity to Saint Martin. It is primarily classified as a dialect due to its former subordination to colonial Antigua and later Saint Kitts-Nevis-Anguilla. It has less than 10,000 speakers.
Montserrat Creole
This is the closest variety to North Antiguan. It is spoken primarily in Montserrat with 7,600 speakers, along with the sizable Montserratian diaspora. It has a relationship with Irish language and has similarities with Jamaican Patois due to the island's colonial history.
Kokoy
This variety developed in Dominica from descendants of Antiguan and Montserratian settlers. It is natively spoken in the northeastern part of the country, where these people make up the majority, but it has since spread throughout the country to become the island's main English creole. Some studies consider Dominican Creole English and Kokoy separate varieties.

== Vocabulary ==
Each variety has a distinct vocabulary. North Antiguan has experienced significant decreolisation and has the highest number of acrolectal speakers. North Antiguan uses the pronouns shi, i, and hi, compared to the pronouns om and i in the most basilectal variety South Antiguan. The Saint Kitts variety tends to use local terms to describe complex subjects, unlike the varieties used in Antigua and Barbuda that primarily switch to acrolect when comfronted with these subjects. Montserratian has many Irish language terms such as ménsha, used to describe a young female goat. Montserratian also uses many other terms only seen in the southern United States. In Anguilla, the term ti is used for the English word "it". The North Antiguan word a, used in most of the other varieties, is instead rendered as uh in Anguillan.

== Sociolinguistics ==
Usage of creole is frowned upon in professional circumstances in all of these countries. It tends to be more accepted in Antigua and Barbuda, Dominica, and Saint Kitts and Nevis due to these countries seeking to separate themselves from the British colonial past. North Antiguan tends to be the most respected variety due to its similarities with standard English and its dominance as the most spoken variety of the language, especially in Antigua and Barbuda. Speakers of Antiguan and Barbudan Creole nearly always identify with their dialect instead of with the language as a whole. Kokoy and South Antiguan are both minority languages on their islands, and these varieties are also the most distant from North Antiguan, with these dialects nearly always being viewed unprofessional. Code switching is especially common, usually with Caribbean English dialects such as Antiguan and Barbudan English or between basilectal, mesolectal, and acrolectal varieties.

== See also ==
- Languages of Antigua and Barbuda
- List of dialects of English
