= Montserrat Creole =

Creole spoken in Montserrat

- Native to: Montserrat
- Native speakers: (7,600 in Montserrat cited 2001) many left after the eruption of Soufriere in 1995
- Language family: English-African Creole: Guinea Coast Creole English; Caribbean Creole English; Eastern Caribbean; Gullah–Nevis–Antigua; Antiguan and Barbudan Creole; Montserrat Creole

Language codes
- ISO 639-3: –
- Glottolog: None
- IETF: aig-MS
- regions where Montserrat Creole is the language of the majority

Montserrat Creole is a variety of Antiguan and Barbudan Creole spoken in Montserrat. The number of speakers of Montserrat Creole is below 10,000. Montserrat Creole does not have the status of an official language.

A lot of similarities can be found with Jamaican Creole.

== See also ==
- Antiguan and Barbudan English
- Kokoy
- Saint Kitts Creole
