= Gullah–Nevis–Antigua =

Grouping of creole languages

- Geographic distribution: Leeward Islands; Lucayan Archipelago; portions of the Southern United States and Mexico
- Linguistic classification: English Creole: Guinea Coast Creole English; Caribbean English Creole; Eastern Caribbean; Gullah–Nevis–Antigua

Language codes
- Glottolog: gull1242

Gullah–Nevis–Antigua is a grouping of Eastern Caribbean creoles, spoken in the Leeward Islands, the Lucayan Archipelago, and portions of the Southern United States. The group likely originated in the 1670s, after splitting from the Eastern Caribbean branch, quickly evolving into Antiguan and Barbudan Creole (ABC) and the Bahamian–Gullah branch. The most spoken modern languages in this group include Bahamian Creole, Antiguan and Barbudan Creole, Turks and Caicos Creole, and Gullah.

In Antigua, local dialects of Gullah–Nevis–Antigua were originally spoken before contact with an Antiguan and Barbudan Pidgin caused the birth of the modern-day Antiguan and Barbudan language around the start of the 18th century. This language eventually split into various regional dialects, including one on Saint Kitts that likely had an impact on the development of the Pitkern and later Norfuk languages in the Pacific. The newest variety of Antiguan and Barbudan Creole is Kokoy. This creole emerged following contact between Montserrat Creole and North Antiguan in the late 19th century.

Variation within the Bahamian–Gullah branch led to a split between Afro-Seminole Creole (ASC), Sea Island Creole, and Bahamian Creole around 1720. Sea Island Creole split into several regional varieties around the late 1750s, and ASC underwent this process closer to the 1790s. Around the 1760s, Turks and Caicos Creole split from Bahamian.

== Phonology ==
The creoles tend to have very similar phonology. Nasalized vowels are common in Antiguan and Barbudan, Bahamian, and Gullah. In ABC, all vowels can be nasalized except for the schwa. Palatalization also exists in all the major dialects. H-removal is also common in these languages, except for the South Antiguan variety, likely due to influence from Sranan Tongo. H-insertion also exists in some dialects of the Bahamas. In the Lucayan Archipelago, it is common for [v] and [w] to alternate.

== Vocabulary ==
The Gullah–Nevis–Antigua creoles are relatively conservative in basilectal vocabulary. One example of this is the presence of the verb gi (to give). This term only survives in ABC and the various Surinamese creoles, although it was attested in Bahamian as recently as 1918. Due to large geographic distance, the creoles have significantly diverged in the past few hundred years. Bahamian and Gullah tend to retain very similar features, with many words in the two languages not existing in any other Atlantic creole.

Comparison of the sentence "I walked along there yesterday"
Afro-Seminole	Antigua	Bahamas	Saint Kitts and Nevis	Sea Islands
a wɔɔk lɒŋ de yεsdι	mi mιn waak laŋ de yεstəde	mi dι wɔk dæsaιd yεsədε	mi waak kras de yεsιde	a wɔɔk gα laŋ de yεsədi
