= Lesser Antillean Creole =

Lesser Antillean Creole may refer to:

- Lesser Antillean Creole English
- Lesser Antillean Creole French
