= Bass Strait Pidgin =

English-based pidgin language

- (unattested)
- Native to: Australia
- Region: Bass Strait
- Era: Early 19th century
- Language family: English Creole, with elements, mainly, of the Flinders Island Lingua franca. Also, contained words from the New Holland tribes, as well as, negrito words.

Language codes
- ISO 639-3: None (mis)
- Glottolog: None

Bass Strait Pidgin was an unattested English-based pidgin language spoken in the Bass Strait islands of Australia. It likely developed in the early 1800s as a result of contact between European sealers and Aboriginal women abducted from Tasmania.
