= Wesley, Dominica =

Wesley
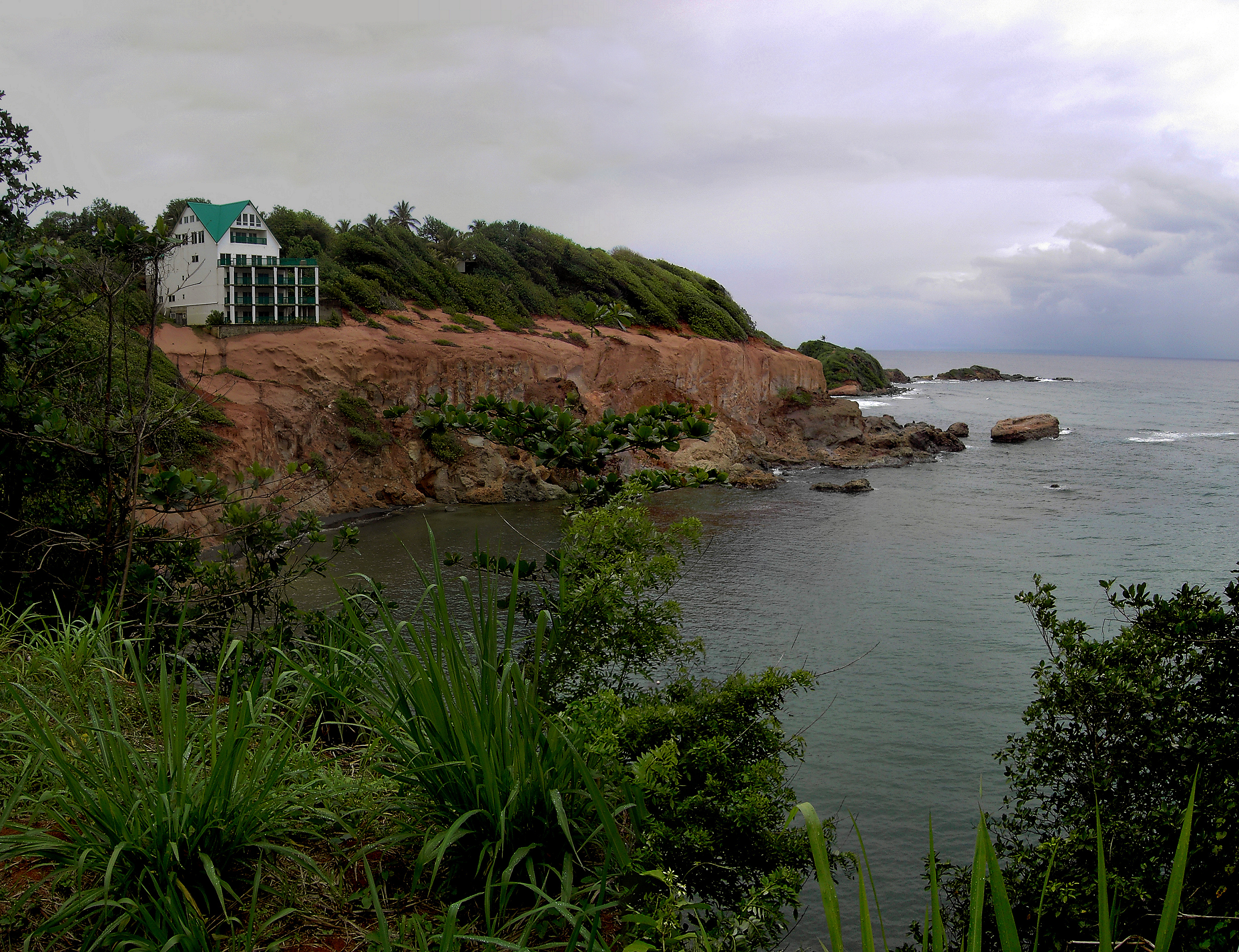

- Location in Dominica
- Coordinates: 15°34′N 61°19′W
- Country: Dominica
- Parish: Saint Andrew Parish

Population (2011)
  - Total: 1,930
- Time zone: UTC-4 (UTC)

Wesley (15°34′N 61°19′W) is a village in Saint Andrew Parish in north-eastern Dominica. It situated between the old estates of Eden and Londonderry and 1 1/2 miles (2.4 km) southeast of Woodford Hill. Like many other villages along the east coast, Wesley developed after Emancipation on hilly land along the boundary between the two estates as labourers sought to establish independent holdings for themselves away from the plantations where they had formerly lived and worked.

Wesley has a population of over 2,000 people. It is the home of the North Eastern Comprehensive School, better known as the NECS after the closing of the St. Andrews School in 2006.

Kokoy is widely spoken in Wesley. It is an English-lexicon creole distinct from the French-lexicon Antillean Creole spoken elsewhere in Dominica. Kokoy reflects the linguistic heritage of the Leeward Island labourers, primarily from Antigua and Barbuda and Montserrat, who settled in the area during the post-emancipation period and whose descendants have maintained this distinct speech variety into the present day.

== History ==
The village of Wesley is situated in an area that was once called Quarte de La Soie when the French occupied Dominica in the early 1700s. Following the British occupation of Dominica, the Estate, called Eden Estate was owned jointly by Joshua Powell and Thomas Hungerford Powell of the City of Bristol until their last known association in 1826.

In the mid-19th century, Charles Leatham, known as the "sugar king" of Dominica, was the owner of the Eden Estate. In 1832, as the agent of the estate, he registered 93 enslaved persons on the Eden Estate to James Matthews and John Gordon, Merchant partners in Dominica. In 1835, following emancipation of the British West Indies, Matthews and Gordon were awarded £1,766 10s 1d in compensation for the 89 enslaved people of Eden Estate. This is equivalent to approximately £1.4–£1.7 million today when measured against relative income (average earnings). Many of those enslaved on the Estate were purchased in 1830 from the Estate of John Adenet Laronde in the parish of Saint Patrick.

While owner of the Estate, Leatham sold several small lots in this area. His estates had been centres for early evangelization by Wesleyan missionaries and by as early as 1837 religious and night school gatherings were being held in a large estate building on Londonderry estate. The emphasis on literacy, lay preaching, and communal worship made Methodism particularly appealing to the formerly enslaved and working poor, and Wesleyan missionaries were among the earliest advocates for the education and spiritual welfare of enslaved and freed peoples in the British West Indies. Methodist influence grew further when free labourers were introduced into the estates of the northeast from Antigua, Montserrat, and other Leeward Islands to replant the sugar estates in cocoa and limes. The Montserratians and Antiguans left a significant cultural influence in Wesley, reinforcing the already strong Protestant identity of the area.

By the 1860s, the settlement was referred to as Wesleyville. Although local tradition attributes the name to an eccentric woman known as Ma Wesley, who supposedly dominated the area as a shopkeeper, the village’s name is likely derived from John Wesley, the founder of Methodism himself, reflecting the profound imprint that the Methodist mission had left on the community and its identity. Eventually Wesleyville was simply called Wesley, while the district continued to be called by its old French parish name, La Soie (La Swa). At the end of the 19th century the Roman Catholic Church began to make a move to evangelize the area, but so strong was the Protestant influence that it had to buy land for the first church by using one of its faithful to purchase the land in his name and then to declare it for the church after the sale was completed. Tensions between the two faiths were high for a time.

In the 1940s and 1950s large-scale land settlement schemes in the interior organized by the British government enabled villagers to buy Crown Lands and free themselves of dependency on the estates. This coincided with the beginning of the banana boom and Wesley benefited materially from this development. Economic growth enabled villagers to improve their housing and send children to secondary schools in Roseau. In 1979 the opening of St. Andrew's High School provided such education closer to home. National political changes also had an effect on the general changes in the community.

In October 2021, the gravestone of former owner of the Eden Estate, Joseph James Wells, was discovered in the Wesley community at the entrance road in an area that was being cleared for parking equipment that was to be used for the construction of an international airport. Wells died on 30 December 1848 and was a member of the Wells family of Antigua.

== Amenities and attractions ==
- Lakwa Waterfall
- Randy's Restaurant
- Jan's Ideal Spot
- Little's Green Bar
- Caribbean Flavor Cuisine
- The Happy Box HQ
- Right now Shopping and bar

Churches

- Catholic
- Seventh-Day Adventist
- Pentecostal
- Baptist
- Seventh Day Church Of God
- Methodist
- Christian Union Mission
