= Demographics of Barbuda =

- Population: 1,634 (▲23.3%)
- Density: 10.2 per km^{2} (26.4 per mi^{2})

Nationality
- Major ethnic: Afro–Antiguans and Barbudans (95.11%)

Language
- Official: English

Demographic features of the population of Barbuda include population density, internet access, crime rate, and other aspects.

== Population ==
According to the 2011 census, the population of Barbuda was 1,634. In March 2025 it was estimated to be 2,233.

== Other demographics statistics (2011) ==
Ethnic groups

- 95.11% African descendant
- 0.13% Caucasian/White
- 0.13% East Indian/India
- 2.88% Mixed (Black/White)
- 1.00% Mixed (Other)
- 0.44% Hispanic
- 0.13% Syrian/Lebanese
- 0.13% Other
- 0.06% Don't know/Not stated

Country of birth

- 89.28% of the population were born in Antigua and Barbuda
- 0.06% of the population were born in Other Latin or North American countries
- 0.44% of the population were born in Other Caribbean countries
- 0.44% in Canada
- 0.13% in Other European countries
- 1.50% Dominica
- 0.44% in the Dominican Republic
- 2.76% in Guyana
- 1.19% in Jamaica
- 0.25% in Montserrat
- 0.44% in St. Kitts and Nevis
- 0.06% in St. Lucia
- 0.44% in St. Vincent and the Grenadines
- 0.13% in Syria
- 0.50% in the United Kingdom
- 1.07% in the United States (Not including the USVI)
- 0.63% in the United States Virgin Islands
- 0.25% Not Stated

Immigration

- 1,447 people were born in Antigua and Barbuda, and 170 were foreign born. People who are foreign born make up 10.5% of the Barbudan population.

Education

- 67.93% of the population are not in education, while 32.07% were enrolled in full and part time education.

Employment

- 76.79% of the population is employed, while 2.83% were seeking work, while the remainder was either unemployed or too young to seek employment.

Health Insurance

- 56.25% of the population is covered by a health insurance scheme, while the remainder was not.

Health

- 10.75% of the population suffered from allergies of any type, 0% suffered from HIV/AIDS, and 6.45% of the population has diabetes.
- 5 Barbudans have cancer, the lowest in the country, compared to 117 sufferers in Saint John or 39 in Saint George.

Housing

- 73.59% of Barbudans lived in owner occupied housing, 20.95% in privately rented accommodation, and 10.47% in overcrowded housing.

Air conditioning

- 11.01% of households used air conditioning, the second highest amount nationwide, behind Saint John with 16.54%.

Telecommunications

- 36.46% of the population are internet users, and 31.89% of households have internet.
- 77.46% of households have cable TV, while 2.16% have satellite TV.
- 50.36% of households have fixed line telephone.

Crime

- 3.87% of the population are victims of any crime (3rd lowest nationwide), with 1.11% being victims of Housebreaking (lowest nationwide), 0.18% being victims of Auto theft (second lowest nationwide), and 1.29% of the population experiencing other crimes (highest nationwide).

Sex ratio

- The sex ratio was 110.42 (males / females x 100).

Active population replacement ratio

- The active population replacement ratio is 254.17 (15-19 / 60-64 x 100).

Dependency ratios

- The old age dependency ratio is 18.29 (60+ / 18-59 x 100).
- The child dependency ratio is 60.72 (<18 / 18-59 x 100), the highest nationwide.

Unemployment and Living Condition Index (Unmet Basic Needs Index)

- Codrington has a Living Condition Index of 14.05 and an unemployment rate of 6.58.
- The rest of the island has a Living Condition Index of 14.52 and an unemployment rate of 2.63.

== See also ==
Demographics of Antigua and Barbuda
