= Spanish language in Antigua and Barbuda =

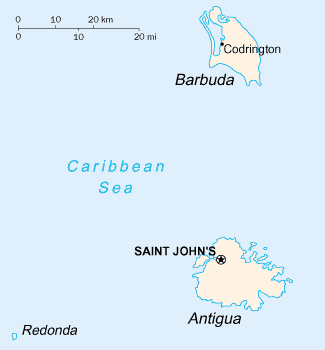
Map of Antigua and Barbuda

In 2011, Spanish was the native language of about 2,083 people or 2.45% of the population of Antigua and Barbuda. Most Spanish speakers in the country are Hispanic people of Dominican Republic origin. Citing the growth of the Dominican minority in the country, Spanish was designated as the official second language of Antigua and Barbuda on 14 May 2026 by the Cabinet. The most spoken dialect of Spanish in the country is Dominican Spanish.

== History ==
Antigua and Barbuda never saw large-scale settlement from the Spanish during the colonial era. Starting in the 1990s, a wave of immigration commenced from the Dominican Republic– a smaller wave in the 1950s also likely introduced some speakers.

On 1 February 2001, the education ministry established a Spanish language program in four areas with a heavy Dominican population. However, one teacher in the program noted that many Hispanic students born in the country had limited competence in Spanish: low enough for it to be taught to them as a second language as well. There was a significant amount of Antiguan-born children who were monolingual in Spanish as well.

A Spanglish dialect was noted as developing among the young Hispanic population. A unique dialect of Spanish native to Antigua and Barbuda solely has yet to be observed thoroughly.

== Official status ==
Spanish was designated as an official second language by Cabinet directive on 14 May 2026. The directive required that Spanish courses be introduced as a core subject into all levels of public education in the country. The stated purposes were to increase economic ties with Latin America and to improve relations with the Dominican community in the country. A Spanish Desk is scheduled to be established in the prime minister's office and a Dominican Republic Integration Programme has been created to encourage Dominican investment and to support the marginalised community within the country. The government stated that the expansion of Spanish-language programs would require up to twenty new Spanish teachers over the next three years and that French-language education would not be impacted.

== See also ==
- Antiguan and Barbudan Creole
- Antiguan and Barbudan English
