= Barbudans =

- Flag of Barbuda

Regions with significant populations
- Barbuda, Leicester, Eastern United States
- Barbuda: <2,233

Languages
- Barbudan Creole, English

Religion
- Christianity (primarily Protestantism)

Related ethnic groups
- Coromantee, Fante

The Barbudans (Barbudan Creole: Baabyuudan an' dey) are an ethnic group native to the island of Barbuda in the eastern Caribbean, primarily of Fante and other Coromantee ancestry. The Barbudans speak Barbudan Creole and the Barbudan dialect of English. The Barbudans make up the majority of the African descendant population in Barbuda, and are also located in various other English-speaking developed countries.

== History and origins ==
The Barbudan people originate from the coasts of Ghana, west of the city of Accra. The Barbudans had been shipped from the port of Cormantin, part of the Fante people inland from the port. Upon arrival in Barbuda, these slaves established a community in the island. The population grew naturally, with only eight new slaves arriving after the initial shipment. During slavery, the Barbudans enjoyed relatively good conditions according to Michael Wood. Except for a brief period in the 1780s, families were rarely broken apart, and were never involved in sugar production due to the island's dry climate. The slaves were also granted provision grounds of about 2–10 acres each. Because of this, the Barbudans had high life expectancies and were stronger and healthier than most other islanders in the region. After emancipation in 1834, the Barbudans worked as waged laborers for the Codringtons until the 1870s. Some Barbudans later moved to Leicester in the United Kingdom, while others followed the general Antiguan and Barbudan immigration patterns, moving to Canada and the United States. The amount of Barbudans living abroad is significantly larger than those living on-island, with the population of Barbuda in 2011 being only 1,634.

Leicester is currently home to a Barbudan community of about 300, with Barbudan immigration to the city encouraged in the 1950s by an Anglican priest named Milburn. When a new Barbudan arrived in the city, they would be greeted with a 'Codrington party'. The city has a Barbudan association that conducts coach trips to Doddington Park, home of the Codrington family.

In addition to predominant African ancestry, the Barbudans also have a small amount of indigenous admixture.

=== Barbudan families ===
All Barbudans are descended from several families, being the origins of the majority of surnames on the island. Most surnames were decided by the slaves themselves or assigned to them by the island's overseers. For much of the island's history, there would only be a few white people on the island at a time.

The progenitor of the Webber family in Barbuda is Abraham Webber, a mixed-race slave and turtler in the 1760s who worked for forty pounds a year. In 1851, there were 22 Webbers on the island. The Punter family is descended from Simon Punter, one of the island's managers in 1742. In 1851 the island had 23 members. The Beazor family (also spelled Beazer), was likely descended from John Beazor, who lived on the island before 1720. In the mid-1740s, there were seven Beazors, and by 1851 there were 41 members.

== Culture ==
The traditional occupations of the Barbudans are hunting and fishing. Many Barbudans are also engaged in horse-racing. Barbuda has a large population of European fallow deer, and thus the consumption of deer meat is common on the island. Shellfish, mostly lobster, crab, and conch is also eaten, along with barracuda, lamb, goat, and beef.

=== Land ===
After the end of Codrington rule in the 1800s, Barbudans deem the island to be part of their inheritance. For hundreds of years, the Barbudans have maintained a system of communal land ownership, with this being recognised in 2007 by the Barbuda Land Act. The act states that anyone with a Barbudan parent or grandparent, regardless of citizenship or residence, may be granted right of occupancy to a portion of Barbuda's land free of charge.

== See also ==
- Antiguans and Barbudans – includes all Barbudans
- Afro–Antiguans and Barbudans – includes most Barbudans
- Demographics of Barbuda
- Codrington – Barbuda's only village
- Barbudan independence movement
- Barbudan federalism
- Anti-Barbudan discrimination
