= Anguillian Creole =

Antiguan Creole dialect of Anguilla

- Anguilla Talk
- Native to: Anguilla
- Native speakers: (12,000 cited 2001)
- Language family: English-African Creole: Guinea Coast Creole English; Caribbean Creole English; Eastern Caribbean; Gullah–Nevis–Antigua; Antiguan and Barbudan Creole; Anguillian Creole

Language codes
- ISO 639-3: –
- Glottolog: None
- IETF: aig-AI
- regions where Anguillian Creole is the language of the majority regions where Anguillian Creole is the language of a significant minority

Anguillian Creole is a variety of Antiguan and Barbudan Creole spoken in Anguilla, an island and British Overseas Territory in the Caribbean. The number of speakers of Anguillian Creole is below 10,000. Anguillian Creole does not have the status of an official language.
