= Demographics of Antigua and Barbuda =

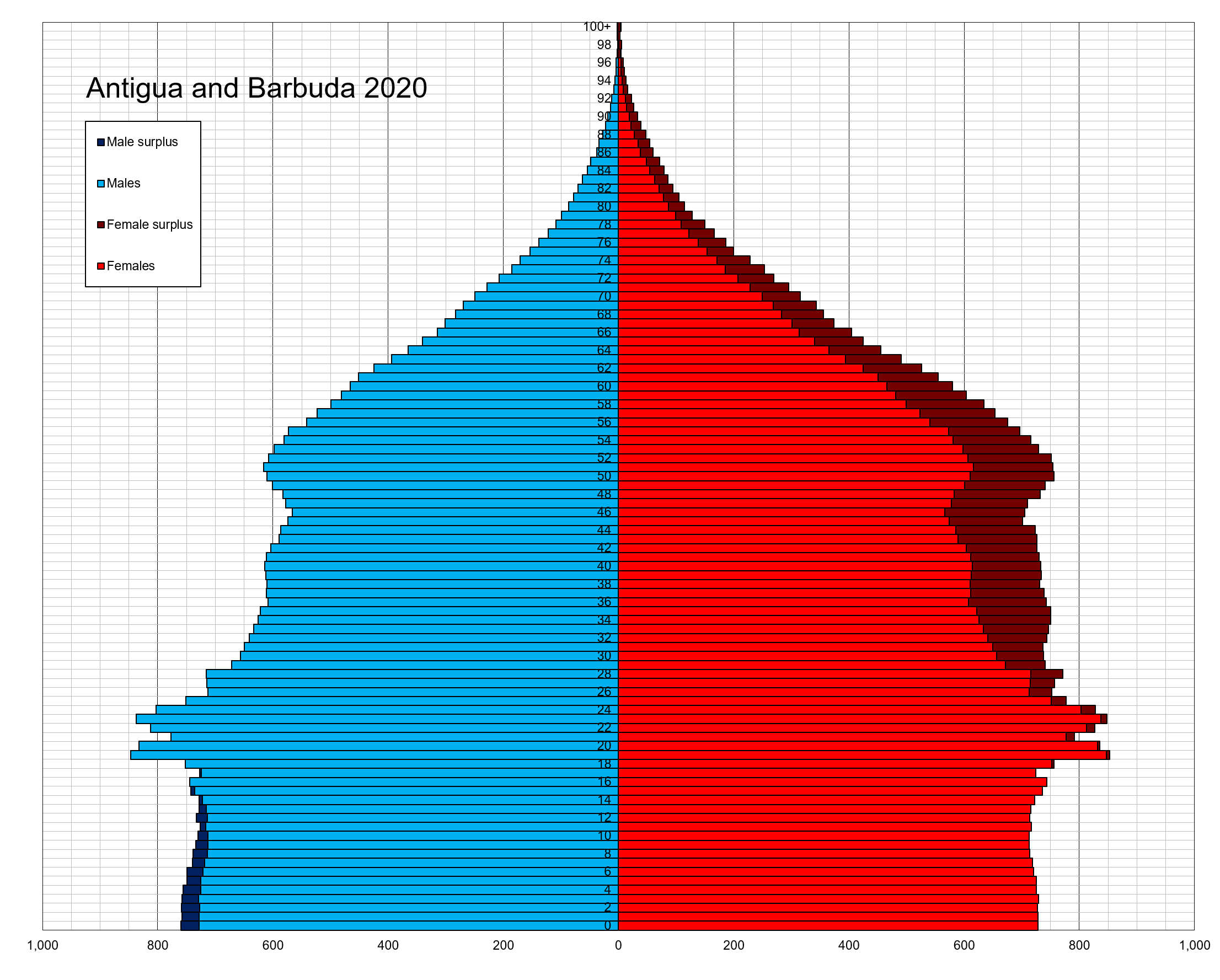
Antigua and Barbuda population pyramid in 2020.

Census population and average annual growth rate
Year	Pop.	±% p.a.
1871	35,157	—
1881	34,964	−0.06%
1891	36,819	+0.52%
1911	32,269	−0.66%
1921	29,767	−0.80%
1946	41,757	+1.36%
1960	54,060	+1.86%
1970	64,794	+1.83%
1991	60,840	−0.30%
2001	76,886	+2.37%
2011	86,295	+1.16%

This article is a demography of the population of Antigua and Barbuda including population density, ethnicity, religious affiliations and other aspects of the population.

== Population size and structure ==
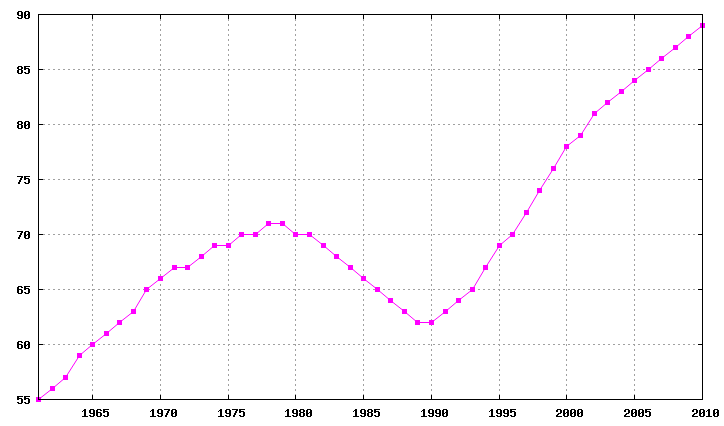
Population of Antigua and Barbuda, Data of FAO, year 2005; Number of inhabitants in thousands.

According to the 2011 census the estimated resident population of Antigua and Barbuda was 86,295. The estimated population of 2021 is 93,219, according to the 2022 revision of the World Population Prospects.

=== Structure of the population ===
Table: Population by Sex and Age Group (Census 27.V.2011):

Age group	Male	Female	Total	%
Total	40 986	44 581	85 567	100
0–4	3 361	3 262	6 623	7.74
5–9	3 272	3 188	6 460	7.55
10–14	3 690	3 638	7 329	8.57
15–19	3 554	3 519	7 073	8.27
20–24	3 206	3 418	6 624	7.74
25–29	3 135	3 512	6 647	7.77
30–34	3 101	3 516	6 617	7.73
35–39	3 049	3 699	6 748	7.89
40–44	3 124	3 588	6 712	7.84
45–49	2 893	3 348	6 241	7.29
50–54	2 416	2 694	5 110	5.97
55–59	1 763	1 957	3 721	4.35
60–64	1 398	1 569	2 968	3.47
65–69	1 066	1 172	2 238	2.62
70–74	690	810	1 500	1.75
75–79	527	654	1 181	1.38
80–84	331	520	850	0.99
85–89	214	298	512	0.60
90–94	72	122	193	0.23
95+	27	57	84	0.10
Age group	Male	Female	Total	Percent
0–14	10 323	10 088	20 411	23.85
15–64	27 640	30 820	58 460	68.32
65+	2 927	3 633	6 560	7.67
unknown	96	40	136	0.16

Table: Population Estimates by Sex and Age Group (01.VII.2021, based on the results of the 2011 Population Census).

Age group	Male	Female	Total	%
Total	47 556	51 781	99 337	100
0–4	3 534	3 464	6 998	7.04
5–9	3 546	3 483	7 029	7.08
10–14	3 620	3 511	7 131	7.18
15–19	3 473	3 387	6 860	6.91
20–24	3 961	3 944	7 905	7.96
25–29	3 892	3 930	7 822	7.87
30–34	3 511	3 795	7 306	7.35
35–39	3 348	3 815	7 163	7.21
40–44	3 280	3 749	7 029	7.08
45–49	3 174	3 850	7 024	7.07
50–54	3 152	3 662	6 814	6.86
55–59	2 819	3 345	6 164	6.21
60–64	2 247	2 627	4 874	4.91
65–69	1 532	1 834	3 366	3.39
70–74	1 095	1 379	2 474	2.49
75–79	698	920	1 618	1.63
80+	674	1 086	1 760	1.77
Age group	Male	Female	Total	Percent
0–14	10 700	10 458	21 158	21.30
15–64	32 857	36 104	68 961	69.42
65+	3 999	5 219	9 218	9.28

== Vital statistics ==
	Average population	Live births	Deaths	Natural change	Crude birth rate (per 1000)	Crude death rate (per 1000)	Natural change (per 1000)	Infant mortality rate	TFR
1950	~46 000	1 654	535	1 119	35.7	11.6	24.2		
1951	~48 000	1 676	605	1 071	34.7	12.5	22.2		
1952	~50 000	1 612	526	1 086	32.3	10.5	21.8		
1953	~51 000	1 687	599	1 088	33.0	11.7	21.3		
1954	~52 000	1 660	532	1 128	31.9	10.2	21.7		
1955	~53 000	1 880	516	1 364	35.7	9.8	25.9		
1956	~53 000	1 917	497	1 420	36.1	9.4	26.8		
1957	~53 000	1 764	512	1 252	33.0	9.6	23.4		
1958	~54 000	1 818	551	1 267	33.8	10.3	23.6		
1959	~54 000	1 831	517	1 314	33.8	9.5	24.3		
1960	~55 000	1 878	538	1 340	34.3	9.8	24.5		
1961	~55 000	1 768	503	1 265	31.9	9.1	22.8		
1962	~56 000	1 787	405	1 382	31.7	7.2	24.5		
1963	~57 000	1 833	574	1 259	32.0	10.0	21.9		
1964	~59 000	1 886	500	1 386	32.2	8.5	23.7		
1965	~60 000	1 742	484	1 258	29.2	8.1	21.1		
1966	~61 000	1 745	492	1 253	28.7	8.1	20.6		
1967	~62 000	1 794	440	1 354	28.9	7.1	21.8		
1968	~63 000	1 811	513	1 298	28.7	8.1	20.5		
1969	~64 000	1 527	410	1 117	23.7	6.4	17.4		
1970	~65 000	1 540	411	1 129	23.6	6.3	17.3		
1971	~66 000	1 700	414	1 286	25.6	6.2	19.4		
1972	~67 000	1 573	455	1 118	23.4	6.8	16.6		
1973	~68 000	1 257	377	880	18.5	5.5	12.9		
1974	~69 000	1 274	496	778	18.6	7.2	11.3		
1975	~69 000	1 336	463	873	19.3	6.7	12.6		
1976	~70 000	1 522	491	1 031	21.8	7.0	14.8		
1977	~70 000	1 429	489	940	20.3	7.0	13.4		
1978	~71 000	1 342	402	940	19.0	5.7	13.3		
1979	~71 000	1 397	469	928	19.8	6.6	13.2		
1980	~70 000	1 238	387	851	17.6	5.5	12.1		
1981	~70 000	1 177	377	800	16.9	5.4	11.5		
1982	~69 000	1 152	394	758	16.7	5.7	11.0		
1983	~68 000	1 174	404	770	17.3	5.9	11.3		
1984	~67 000	1 126	386	740	16.8	5.8	11.1		
1985	~66 000	1 190	405	785	18.1	6.2	11.9		
1986	~65 000	1 130	383	747	17.5	5.9	11.6		
1987	~63 000	1 104	417	687	17.4	6.6	10.8		
1988	~63 000	1 107	389	718	17.7	6.2	11.5		
1989	~62 000	1 137	415	722	18.3	6.7	11.7		
1990	~62 000	1 288	433	855	20.8	7.0	13.8		
1991	63 878	1 178	438	740	18.9	7.0	11.9		
1992	64 682	1 256	442	814	19.8	7.0	12.8		
1993	65 505	1 228	455	773	18.9	7.0	11.9		
1994	66 416	1 271	451	820	19.1	6.8	12.3		
1995	67 608	1 347	434	913	19.7	6.3	13.4		
1996	68 612	1 400	429	971	19.9	6.1	13.8		
1997	68 890	1 448	468	980	20.0	6.5	13.6		
1998	69 866	1 366	456	910	18.4	6.1	12.3		
1999	70 856	1 329	509	820	17.5	6.7	10.8		
2000	72 310	1 528	447	1 081	19.7	6.2	13.5		
2001	76 886	1 350	462	888	17.6	6.0	11.6	17.8	
2002	77 665	1 193	444	749	15.4	5.7	9.7	17.6	
2003	78 412	1 227	454	773	15.7	5.8	9.9	14.7	
2004	79 196	1 257	516	741	15.9	6.5	9.4	22.3	
2005	80 007	1 190	497	693	14.9	6.2	8.7	13.5	1.6
2006	80 855	1 195	465	730	14.8	5.8	9.0	8.4	1.6
2007	81 736	1 282	471	811	15.7	5.8	9.9	17.9	1.86
2008	82 663	1 438	538	900	17.4	6.5	10.9	17.4	2.06
2009	83 624	1 404	515	889	16.8	6.2	10.6	14.3	2.02
2010	84 622	1 245	498	747	14.7	5.9	8.8	12.9	1.78
2011	85 567	1 232	475	757	14.4	5.6	8.8	20.3	1.75
2012	86 793	1 174	507	667	13.5	5.8	7.7	16.2	1.66
2013	88 069	1 093	463	630	12.4	5.3	7.1	11.0	1.53
2014	89 391	1 100	590	510	12.3	6.6	5.7	11.8	1.53
2015	90 755	1 159	527	632	12.8	5.8	7.0	8.6	1.58
2016	92 157	1 063	542	521	11.5	5.9	5.6	12.2	1.45
2017	93 581	1 108	599	509	11.8	6.4	5.4	9.0	1.50
2018	95 014	1 015	581	434	10.7	6.1	4.6	22.7	1.36
2019	96 453	1 088	618	470	11.3	6.0	5.3	12.0	1.45
2020	97 895	1 163	574	589	11.9	6.0	5.9	6.0	1.53
2021	99 337		649			6.6			
2022	100 772								

=== Fertility ===
Years	1900	1901	1902	1903	1904	1905	1906	1907	1908	1909
Total Fertility Rate in Antigua and Barbuda	4.63	4.63	4.62	4.62	4.62	4.61	4.61	4.60	4.60	4.60

Years	1910	1911	1912	1913	1914	1915	1916	1917	1918	1919
Total Fertility Rate in Antigua and Barbuda	4.59	4.59	4.59	4.58	4.58	4.58	4.57	4.57	4.56	4.56

Years	1920	1921	1922	1923	1924	1925	1926	1927	1928	1929
Total Fertility Rate in Antigua and Barbuda	4.56	4.55	4.55	4.55	4.54	4.54	4.53	4.53	4.53	4.52

Years	1930	1931	1932	1933	1934	1935	1936	1937	1938	1939
Total Fertility Rate in Antigua and Barbuda	4.52	4.52	4.51	4.51	4.51	4.50	4.50	4.49	4.49	4.49

Years	1940	1941	1942	1943	1944	1945	1946	1947	1948	1949
Total Fertility Rate in Antigua and Barbuda	4.48	4.48	4.48	4.47	4.47	4.46	4.46	4.46	4.45	4.45

== Ethnic groups ==
The population of Antigua and Barbuda, is predominantly black (91.0%) or mixed (4.4%). 1.9% of the population is white and 0.7% East Indian. There is also a small Amerindian population: 177 in 1991 and 214 in 2001 (0.3% of the total population). The remaining 1.6% of the population includes people from the Middle East (0.6%) and China (0.2%).

The 2001 census disclosed that 19,425, or 30 per cent of the total population of Antigua and Barbuda, reported their place of birth as a foreign country. Over 15,000 of these persons were from other Caribbean states, representing 80 of the total foreign born. The main countries of origin were Guyana, Dominica and Jamaica. Approximately 4,500 or 23 per cent of all foreign born came from Guyana, 3,300 or 17 per cent came from Dominica and 2,800 or 14 per cent came from Jamaica. The largest single group from a country outside the region came from the United States. Of the total of 1,715 persons, nine per cent of the foreign born, came from the United States while three per cent and one per cent came from the United Kingdom and Canada, respectively. Many of these are the children of Antiguans and Barbudans who had emigrated to these countries, mainly during the 1980s, and subsequently returned.

== Languages ==
Antiguan and Barbudan Creole, English

== Religion ==
Protestant 68.3% (Anglican 17.6%, Seventh Day Adventist 12.4%, Pentecostal 12.2%, Moravian 8.3%, Methodist 5.6%, Wesleyan Holiness 4.5%, Church of God 4.1%, Baptist 3.6%), Roman Catholic 8.2%, other 12.2%, unspecified 5.5%, none 5.9% (2011 est.)
