= Venezuelan English Creole =

English-based Creole language of Venezuela

- Region: Venezuela
- Native speakers: likely endangered
- Language family: Indo-European: Germanic; West Germanic; North Sea Germanic; Anglo–Frisian; Anglic; English; Caribbean English; Venezuelan English Creole

Language codes
- ISO 639-3: –

Venezuelan English Creole is a collection of Caribbean English-based Creoles spoken throughout Venezuela. Venezuelan English Creole developed from the English Creoles spoken by Anglo-Caribbean immigrants who immigrated to Venezuela during the gold rush and subsequent oil boom, namely from Trinidad and Tobago, Grenada, Dominica and Guyana. Venezuelan English Creole is English-based with influences from French, French Antillean Creole, Spanish, Dutch and Papiamento. It is unknown how many speakers of this language still remain but it is assumed to be endangered.

Speakers of Venezuelan English Creole are most concentrated in the Bolivar state, especially in the town of El Callao near the Guyanese border. There are also communities of speakers in Central and Western Venezuela.
