= Radio Range, St. John's =

Radio Range
- Village
- Location within Antigua and Barbuda
- Coordinates: 17°6′46″N 61°50′6″W
- Country: Antigua and Barbuda
- Island: Antigua
- Civil parish: Saint John Parish

Government
  - Type: Village Council (possibly dissolved)

Population (2011)
  - Total: 328
- Time zone: UTC-4 (AST)

Radio Range is a settlement in Saint John Parish, Antigua and Barbuda.

== Demographics ==
Radio Range has one enumeration district, 14700 Radio Range.

Ethnic
Q48 Ethnic	Counts	%
African descendent	235	71.70%
Caucasian/White	3	0.96%
East Indian/India	1	0.32%
Mixed (Black/White)	4	1.29%
Mixed (Other)	8	2.57%
Hispanic	14	4.18%
Syrian/Lebanese	58	17.68%
Other	4	1.29%
Total	328	100.00%

Religion
Q49 Religion	Counts	%
Adventist	50	15.11%
Anglican	47	14.47%
Baptist	21	6.43%
Church of God	11	3.22%
Evangelical	17	5.14%
Jehovah Witness	2	0.64%
Methodist	15	4.50%
Moravian	8	2.57%
Nazarene	1	0.32%
None/no religion	23	7.07%
Pentecostal	28	8.68%
Roman Catholic	78	23.79%
Weslyan Holiness	9	2.89%
Other	7	2.25%
Don't know/Not stated	9	2.89%
Total	328	100.00%

Country of birth
Q58. Country of birth	Counts	%
Africa	12	3.54%
Antigua and Barbuda	175	53.38%
Other Caribbean countries	16	4.82%
Canada	1	0.32%
Other Asian countries	5	1.61%
Dominica	7	2.25%
Dominican Republic	5	1.61%
Guyana	16	4.82%
Jamaica	17	5.14%
Monsterrat	6	1.93%
St. Kitts and Nevis	2	0.64%
St. Lucia	1	0.32%
St. Vincent and the Grenadines	1	0.32%
Syria	35	10.61%
Trinidad and Tobago	6	1.93%
United Kingdom	2	0.64%
USA	17	5.14%
USVI United States Virgin Islands	1	0.32%
Not Stated	2	0.64%
Total	328	100.00%

Country of Citizenship
Q71 Country of Citizenship 1	Counts	%
Antigua and Barbuda	242	73.95%
Other Caribbean countries	12	3.54%
Canada	1	0.32%
Other Asian and Middle Eastern countries	21	6.43%
Dominica	2	0.64%
Dominican Republic	4	1.29%
Guyana	11	3.22%
Jamaica	15	4.50%
Monsterrat	1	0.32%
St. Lucia	1	0.32%
Trinidad and Tobago	2	0.64%
United Kingdom	1	0.32%
USA	4	1.29%
Other countries	11	3.22%
Total	328	100.00%

Country of Second/Dual Citizenship
Q71 Country of Citizenship 2 (Country of Second/Dual Citizenship)	Counts	%
Other Caribbean countries	5	6.94%
Other Asian and Middle Eastern countries	18	23.61%
Dominica	5	6.94%
Dominican Republic	1	1.39%
Guyana	5	6.94%
Jamaica	3	4.17%
Monsterrat	6	8.33%
St. Vincent and the Grenadines	1	1.39%
Trinidad and Tobago	4	5.56%
United Kingdom	7	9.72%
USA	17	22.22%
Other countries	2	2.78%
Total	76	100.00%
NotApp :	252	
