= Discrimination in Antigua and Barbuda =

Discrimination in Antigua and Barbuda refers to all forms and expressions of actions that restrict social participation or deny human rights to specific groups of people in Antiguan and Barbudan society or institutions. Antigua and Barbuda struggles severely with ethnic and gender discrimination, with common issues including the gender pay gap, ethnic discrimination, and discrimination against immigrants.

== Gender discrimination ==
Antigua and Barbuda struggles with gender discrimination. According to the Directorate of Gender Affairs, the most common issue in the country relating to gender discrimination is gender-based stereotypes. In the country, many women head single-parent households, and often have to care for the elderly and other dependents. As women usually occupy lower paid jobs and have high levels of unpaid domestic work, this usually results in high poverty rates in women. In media, women are sexually objectified, but due to the lack of a national media regulatory body, it is hard for complaints to be made. It is also very common for women to be blamed for gender-based sexual violence. As affirmative action does not exist in Antigua and Barbuda, workforce participation for women is hindered.

== Ethnic and immigrant discrimination ==
In 2011, 30% of people in Antigua and Barbuda were immigrants, and 13% were part of an ethnic minority. It is common in Antigua and Barbuda for immigrants to be told to "go back to where you came from", and people are often insulted for seeking immigration-related services. According to WiredJA, CARICOM nationals are also subject to random stops by immigration officials, especially in the V. C. Bird International Airport. African and CARICOM nationals are also more likely to be discriminated against and forced into human trafficking.

According to Prime Minister Gaston Browne, 15% of the prison population is Jamaican even though they only make up about 5% of the national population.

=== Anti-Barbudan discrimination ===
Anti-Barbudan discrimination is common in Antigua, especially since the start of the Barbuda crisis in 2017. Browne is a major proponent of this, spreading false claims in 2020 that Barbuda is in an inbreeding crisis, and encouraging Barbuda Council members to work with health minister Molwyn Joseph to "find a solution". The human rights of Barbudans are also contentious, with proposals made for Barbudans to have to pay for land they currently occupy, and elections being held when Barbudans do not have access to a polling place within their constituency.
