= Afro–Antiguans and Barbudans =

- Distribution of Afro-Antiguans and Barbudans

Total population
- Approx. 82,041

Regions with significant populations
- Antigua and Barbuda (Approx. 82,041)

Languages
- Antiguan and Barbudan Creole, English

Religion
- Christianity (primarily Protestantism)

Afro–Antiguans and Barbudans are Antiguans and Barbudans of entirely or predominantly African (notably West African) ancestry. People in the country of Antiguan and Barbudan ancestry are known as Antiguan and Barbudan Creoles– this group includes people descended from slavery in the islands as well as white people descended from the island's plantocracy.

According to the 2011 census, 87% of Antigua and Barbuda's population is Black and 4.4% is multiracial.

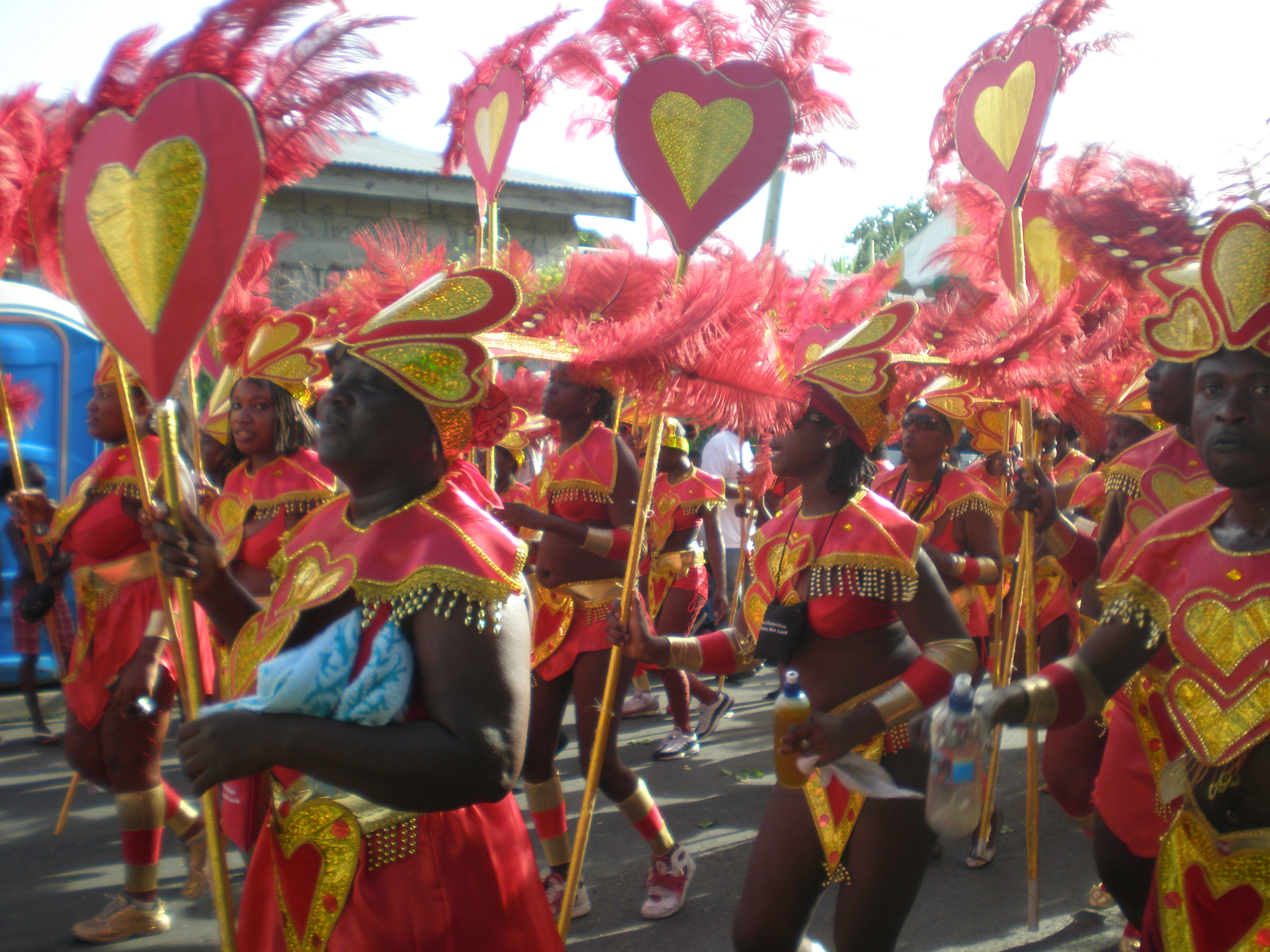
Antiguan carnival revelers

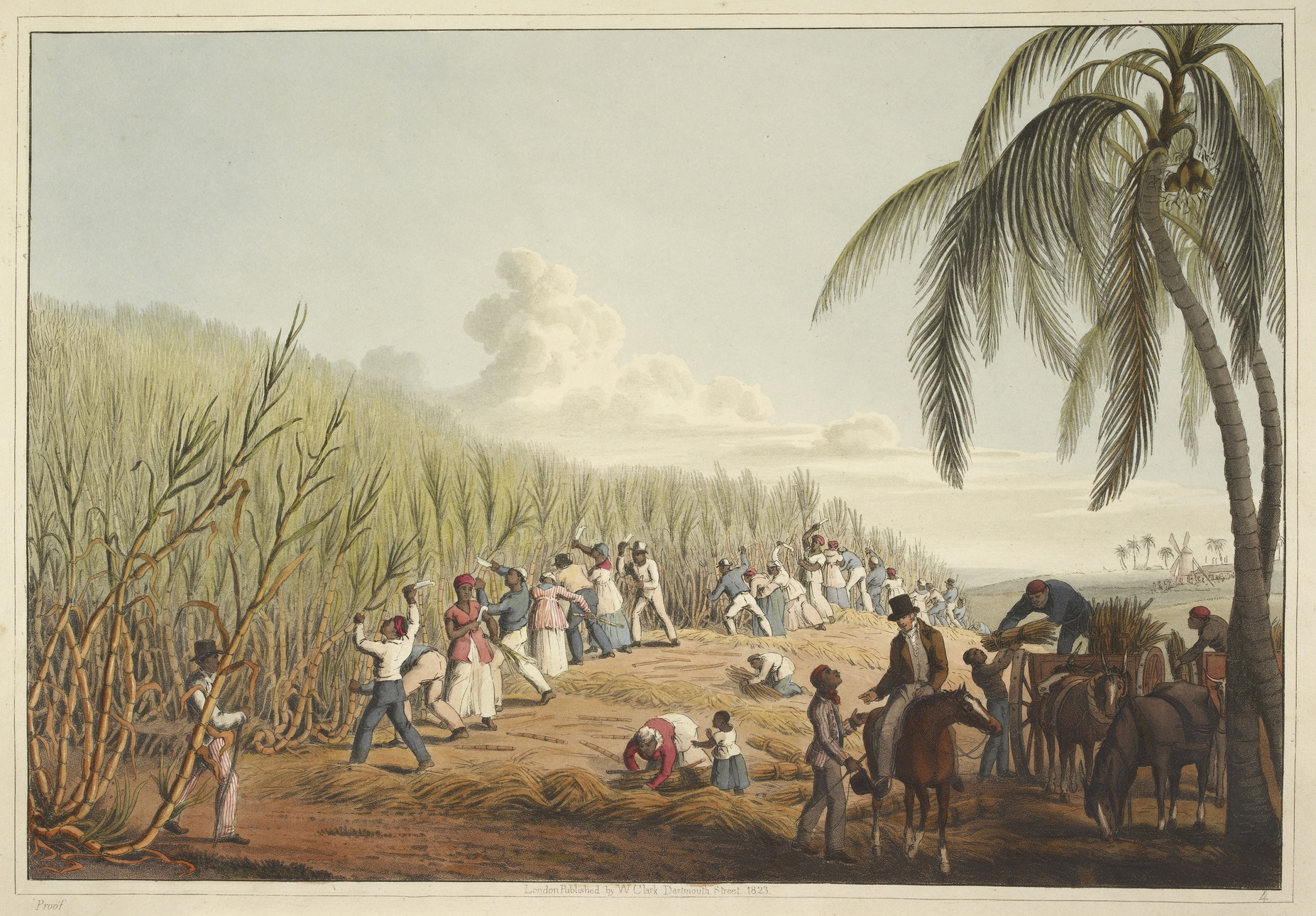
Slaves cutting sugar cane in Antigua

== Origins ==
Most of the enslaved Africans brought to Antigua and Barbuda disembarked from the Bight of Biafra (22,000 Africans) and the Gold Coast (16,000 Africans). Other African slaves came from the Windward Coast (11,000 Africans), the West Central Africa (9,000 Africans), the Bight of Benin (6,000 Africans), Senegambia (5,000 Africans), Guinea and Sierra Leone (4,000 Africans).

== History ==
Settlers raised tobacco, indigo, ginger, and sugarcane as cash crops. Sir Christopher Codrington established the first large sugar estate in Antigua in 1674, and leased Barbuda to raise provisions for his plantations. In the fifty years after Codrington established his initial plantation, the sugar industry became so profitable that many farmers replaced other crops with sugar, making it the economic backbone of the islands. Codrington and others brought slaves from Africa's western coast to work the plantations. Africans started arriving in Antigua and Barbuda in large numbers during the 1670s; they soon became the largest racial group of Antigua and Barbuda.

With all others in the British Empire, Antiguan and Barbudan slaves were emancipated in 1834, but remained economically dependent upon the plantation owners. Economic opportunities for the new freedmen were limited by a lack of surplus farming land, no access to credit, and an economy built on agriculture rather than manufacturing. Poor labour conditions persisted until 1939, when a member of a royal commission urged the formation of a trade union movement.

In the 20th-century was redefined the role of Afro–Antiguans and Barbudans. The colonial social structure gradually started to be phased out with the introduction of universal education and better economic opportunities.

== Demographics ==
Afro–Antiguans and Barbudans by Parish
Parish Name	Counts	Percentage
Saint John's City	18,366	84.86%
Saint John Rural	24,861	84.31%
Saint Mary	6,754	92.13%
Saint George	7,122	89.29%
Saint Peter	4,937	92.85%
Saint Philip	3,028	91.15%
Saint Paul	7,405	91.24%
Barbuda	1,546	95.11%

Place of Birth of Afro–Antiguans and Barbudans
Parish Name	Africa	Other Latin or North American countries	Other Caribbean countries	Canada	Other Asian countries	Other European countries	Dominica	Dominican Republic	Guyana	Jamaica	Monsterrat	Antigua and Barbuda	St. Kitts and Nevis	St. Lucia	St. Vincent and the Grenadines	Syria	Trinidad and Tobago	United Kingdom	USA	USVI United States Virgin Islands	Not Stated
Saint John's City	93	6	119	20	3	3	1,071	139	1,791	1,311	221	12,553	86	152	143	0	67	42	306	69	170
Saint John Rural	113	20	223	74	4	9	1,340	62	1,614	1,613	244	17,527	120	200	286	0	119	131	767	128	265
Saint Mary	3	4	18	17	2	5	203	8	283	314	34	5,470	26	20	19	0	17	36	184	52	39
Saint George	14	3	69	23	1	2	239	15	273	279	61	5,463	37	113	56	0	31	56	244	42	98
Saint Peter	2	6	24	6	0	0	139	7	324	154	22	3,870	23	7	41	0	10	15	147	27	114
Saint Philip	4	2	14	9	1	2	81	4	99	92	6	2,444	7	9	18	0	6	9	123	16	81
Saint Paul	11	6	53	12	2	1	149	12	347	391	28	5,915	30	33	46	0	18	33	219	53	49
Barbuda	0	1	3	3	0	0	22	0	39	19	4	1,409	6	1	7	0	0	6	15	3	2
