= Barbudan Creole =

Creole spoken in Barbuda

- Baabyuudan
- Region: Barbuda
- Ethnicity: Barbudans
- Native speakers: ~1,400 (in Antigua and Barbuda; 2011 estimate)
- Language family: English Creole: Antiguan and Barbudan Creole; Barbudan Creole

Language codes
- ISO 639-3: –
- Linguasphere: 52-ABB-apl
- IETF: aig-u-sd-ag10
- regions where Barbudan Creole is the language of the majority

Barbudan Creole is a variety of Antiguan and Barbudan Creole primarily spoken by Barbudans. The dialect is more distant from the dialects of the language spoken in Antigua than that of Montserrat, and the creole largely developed separately from Antiguan Creole due to the isolation of the island and Barbuda having very few English inhabitants during colonial times. As nearly all Barbudans are of Fante ancestry, the creole also tends to be more influenced by the Fante dialect. The past tense marker min is a distinctive feature of the dialect.

== Etymology ==
Barbudan Creole is a formal term often used as an exonym by linguists. In most informal situations, the language is referred to as dialect, raw, broad, or scrap language. Prop taakin is a term used to refer to a mix of Barbudan Creole and standard English, and yankin' is a related term. Usage of these acrolectal registers tends to be looked down upon in Barbudan society.

== History ==
Beginning in the 1600s, colonists made many attempts at settling Barbuda, each time driven away by the Kalinago, which inhabited the island up to the 1700s. In 1668, John Winthorpe briefly leased the island until relinquishing it, resulting in the Codrington family leasing it from 1685. The development of Barbudan Creole was heavily impacted by the lack of English speakers, ranging from one to four for most of the island's history. White settlement and immigration was largely banned aside from the resident manager until the 1850s, and was still nearly non-existent up to the 2000s.

== Grammar ==
A is the most common progressive aspectual marker in the language. De is also heard to a lesser extent, although it is viewed as less proper and is part of the basilect. There are two future tense markers, go and a go which depend on context. Go is described by Winford as indicating volition, and a go is viewed as indicating intention. Some other future tense markers such as wan and wil also exist, although these are much rarer and only a few persons in a 2002 study used them. Min and the reduced mi are the main past tense markers. An dey is considered the "purest" plural marker among Barbudans, although the plural marker an dem is also heard on the island. The North Antiguan term aayu is also sometimes heard as unu in Barbuda, and the South Antiguan om or am is used in Barbuda to refer to objects.
