= Saint Kitts Creole =

Spoken language in Saint Kitts and Nevis

- Nevisian, Nevis Creole
- Native to: Saint Kitts and Nevis
- Native speakers: (undated figure of 39,000)
- Language family: English-African Creole: Guinea Coast Creole English; Caribbean Creole English; Eastern Caribbean; Gullah–Nevis–Antigua; Antiguan and Barbudan Creole; Saint Kitts Creole

Language codes
- ISO 639-3: –
- Glottolog: None
- IETF: aig-KN
- regions where Saint Kitts Creole is the language of the majority regions where Saint Kitts Creole is the language of a significant minority

Saint Kitts Creole is a variety of Antiguan and Barbudan Creole spoken in Saint Kitts and Nevis by around 40,000 people but is not its country’s official language.

The history of Saint Kitts Creole is similar to that of other English Caribbean creoles. In the 17th century, enslaved West Africans in Saint Kitts had to learn British English quickly because their labour on sugar plantations required it. Their English was mixed with West African words and, in some cases, West African language structure. The French, who occupied the island 1625-1713, had only a small impact on the language, unlike in the formerly French islands of Dominica and Saint Lucia, which speak a French-based rather than English-based creole.

Saint Kitts Creole today is spoken on the islands of St. Kitts and Nevis (although Nevisians refer to the language as "Nevisian" or "Nevis creole"), especially in Capesterre (Christ Church Nichola Town, Cayon) and Nevis. Today’s creole uses more Standard English than before, possibly due to access to foreign media. Rural residents are generally the strongest creole users, although the majority of the population uses mesolectal forms of the language. To the uninitiated, creole speakers may sound Jamaican, but Jamaican patois has no influence on Saint Kitts and Nevis creole. Saint Kitts pronunciation is similar to the pronunciation on the neighbouring Antigua and Montserrat but with slight differences that are mostly noticeable only to residents of the Leeward Islands.

== Pronunciation ==
Saint Kitts Creole is pronounced similarly to the creoles of neighbouring islands, namely Antigua and Montserrat. Usually only longtime residents in the islands can mark the slight differences. In rural areas and in Nevis, /aʊ/ (as in "house") is usually pronounced [oʊ] (as in "hose").

== Grammar ==
In Saint Kitts Creole, words are rarely pluralized by adding an ending to the word. The word is usually followed by the word dem to indicate the pluralization. e.g. de gyul dem - "the girls". Note that if the Standard English form of the word is not pluralized with an "s", e.g. "children", the plural form of the word in Saint Kitts creole will be the Standard English plural form followed by dem, e.g. children dem.

Questions ending in "is it?" have the "is it" replaced with e be (eee bee); e.g. Who is it? - Who e be? What is it? - Wha e be?

Words used to intensify adjectives, such as "very" and "extremely", are rarely used. Instead, the adjective in question is repeated; for example: De gyul look bad bad - "The girl looks very ugly." Alternatively, the phrase "so tail" is placed after the adjective to indicate a strong emphasis or intensification; for example: De gyul look bad so tail - "The girl looks extremely ugly."

A unique aspect of Saint Kitts Creole is to end certain sentences in the speech with the words burdee, poopa or daady buh, the meaning of which vary with context but tend to be used to emphasise the sentence they attach to; for example: Tall poopa - "not at all" (extreme). Hush buhdee - "hush buddy" (used when extremely annoyed).

The word "does" is often traditionally inserted where it would not appear in Standard English sentence structure.

I does only buy taman jam from she. I only buy tamarind jam from her.

Whey yuh does be goin erry mawnin? Where do you go each morning?

I does do dah too. I also do that.

Yuh does guh by dey house? Do you visit their home?

Examples of other linguistic divergences from Standard English are

Ah does buy it. I usually buy it.

Ah did buy it. I bought it.

Ah done buy it. I already bought it. Also can be said as - Ah did buy it arready.

Ah goin buy it. I will buy it.

Ah goin guh buy it. I am on my way to buy it.

=== Example sentences ===
Ahwee/Awe a go dung by e fiel by d house go pik nuts. - We are going down to the field by the house to pick peanuts.

Is dey dem pikni does wash dem skin. - There is where the children bathe (their skin).

You know who e tis u a play wit. - You do not know with whom you are messing.

=== Example words and phrases ===
Some of the Saint Kitts Creole words listed below are unique, but others are commonly used in or originated from neighbouring islands.

- Coop = spying surreptitiously on someone to try and catch them in some inappropriate act, or to surprise them.
- Baae = A Boo or jeer (also used to describe the action of sticking one's tongue out at another person)
- Bony/Mawga = Skinny, malnourished
- Duttyfoot/slack/pan/kite = a slut
- Forward = (Forward) insolent, rude
- Guh bag yuh face = (Go and bag your face) You are so repulsive that you should cover your face.
- Guh whey yuh goin = get away from me (with the connotation that the person being dismissed wants to go and do their own thing despite the speakers feelings.)
- Jelly = young coconut; the flesh inside of a young coconut which has a jelly-like consistency
- Jelly water = coconut water
- Jumbie = an undead spirit/ghost.
- Mi arm, Mi moddas, Mi fardas = oh my!
- Mind = take care of e.g. Mind the baby; take heed e.g. Mind what you're doing.
- Moomoo = stupid; a stupid person
- Moosheh = a very light skinned person. Originally used to describe Portuguese descendants who populated a village, located in the hills above western Sandy Point
- Outta place/outta order = rude with the connotation of indiscretion and acting inappropriately.
- Pissytail lil boy/girl = a young person, especially one who tries to act older than their age or disrespects those who are older than they are.
- Poop = pass gas
- Quelbeh = ungodly music
- Ride/riding = sexual intercourse
- Scraab = scratch
- She fass = She is a busybody
- Um/dem = them
- Wha mek = why, how come
- Who yuh fah\who yuh people be? = what family do you come from?
- Win = painful gas trapped inside the stomach or other body parts
- Wukkup = gyrating dance
- Yampi = mucus in the eye, from Igbo ẹnyampi, 'blind'.
- Yuh gaah head = take heed

=== More commonly used words ===
- O me monkeys! = O My!
- Ah geed = Yuck!
- Boy aye! = Aw man!
- Ent it? = Isn't that so
- Wha mek? = How come
- M'ain know = I don't know
- Lef me = Leave me alone
- Tek een = Faint/pass out
- Ar-you/Awu = You all
- Arwee/Awe/Arbee =Us
- Stop play = Stop kidding around
- Y'ain hear = I know right
- E suit you = Serves you right
- In deh, in deh! = Take that
- Dem = Them
- Dey = They

== Traditional proverbs ==
Sorry fuh mawgah dawg, mawgah dawg tun roun bite yuh - If you extend your charity to undeserving persons, they will be ungrateful/you will regret it.

Pig bin arkse e mammee wah mek e mouth so long, e mammee tell um wait for you time - When you are older you will understand.

Two man crab cyarn live in de the same hole - you can't have two persons in charge in a small environment.

Monkey know wah limb to climb pon - People know who they can trouble/mess with.

== See also ==
- Krio language
