= Antiguan and Barbudan Creole =

English-based creole language

- Aanteegan an' Baabyuudan / Raabak
- Native to: Leeward Islands: Antigua and Barbuda; Anguilla; Dominica; Montserrat; Saint Kitts and Nevis
- Region: Lesser Antilles
- Native speakers: (150,000 cited 2001–2011)
- Language family: English-African Creole: Guinea Coast Creole English; Caribbean Creole English; Eastern Caribbean; Gullah–Nevis–Antigua; Antiguan and Barbudan Creole
- Early form: Antiguan and Barbudan Pidgin
- Dialects: Saint Kitts Creole; Montserrat Creole; Anguillan Creole; Kokoy; North Antiguan Creole; South Antiguan Creole; Barbudan Creole
- Writing system: Latin

Official status
- Regulated by: Antiguan and Barbudan Language Academy

Language codes
- ISO 639-3: aig
- Glottolog: anti1245
- Linguasphere: 52-ABB-apf
- The Antiguan and Barbudan Creole-speaking world: regions where Antiguan and Barbudan Creole is the language of the majority regions where Antiguan and Barbudan Creole is the language of a significant minority

Antiguan and Barbudan Creole (Note: alternately known as Leeward Caribbean Creole, endonym Raabak or Aanteegan an' Baabyuudan) is an English-based creole language that emerged from contact between speakers of the Kwa languages and speakers of Antiguan and Barbudan English in the Leeward Islands. Today, it is natively spoken in Antigua and Barbuda, Saint Kitts and Nevis, Anguilla, Montserrat, and some villages in Dominica. Antiguan and Barbudan Creole is the most spoken language in two independent countries, and is one of the most spoken languages in the eastern Caribbean. The language has approximately 150,000 native speakers.

Antiguan and Barbudan Creole is composed of several distinct varieties, some of which are only semi-intelligible to each other. Due to increased contact between settlements in the Leeward Islands, the creole has many extinct village-specific varieties that have since merged into each other. The most spoken variety of the creole, North Antiguan, has been particularly affected by decreolisation and influences from other English creoles.

The majority of the Antiguan and Barbudan Creole vocabulary is English in origin, and the language has a unique vowel system as well as distinct grammar. Antiguan and Barbudan Creole remains a language of informal communication, and thus, it is not taught in schools or used in formal academic communication.

== Etymology ==
In Antigua and Barbuda, the endonym of Antiguan and Barbudan Creole is Raabak ([ɹäːbäk]) or Aanteegan an' Baabyuudan. The term Raabak is usually used as an adjective ("to talk raw back"), although the term can also be used as a noun. The most common exonym of the language among linguists is "Antiguan and Barbudan Creole", which may also be called "Antigua and Barbuda Creole English". These exonyms are used in the ISO 639-3 standard, and the term "Leeward Caribbean Creole" or "Leeward Caribbean Creole English" is less common. Speakers usually identify with their dialect rather than with the entire language.

== History ==
The first confirmed English settlement in Antigua and Barbuda was in 1632, and a unique English dialect known as Antiguan and Barbudan English (ABE) eventually emerged. In 1674, the Antigua's first sugar plantation was established, which resulted in a significant increase in the slave population and the island eventually becoming majority African by the 1680s. Antiguan and Barbudan Creole emerged when speakers of ABE made contact with African slaves. In 1685 slavery in Barbuda commenced, with Barbudans being nearly completely isolated from the white population and other islands, resulting in the emergence of Barbudan Creole. As most slaves that were brought to both Antigua and Barbuda spoke languages from the Kwa cluster, these languages became Antiguan and Barbudan Creole's substrate.

After emancipation, the language continued to be spoken by former slaves, and as new villages emerged the language began to split into various dialects. These village-specific creoles existed until the 1960s, when people began to commute into cities and island-wide dialects emerged. South Antiguan Creole was the least impacted by outside influence, and thus can only be partially understood by speakers of other dialects.

Since the 1970s and 1980s, the language has been viewed more positively, and Antiguan and Barbudan Creole texts can now be seen in some newspapers and on television.

== Geographical distribution ==
Map of dialects in Antigua and Barbuda

Antiguan and Barbudan Creole is the primary language in four countries and territories. The language is also spoken by a minority of the population of Dominica, which primarily speaks Dominican Creole French. In Dominica, Kokoy is spoken by a majority of the population in certain northeastern villages, a dialect that emerged in the late nineteenth century from Antiguan and Barbudan and Montserratian immigrants.

In Antigua and Barbuda, there are three dialects–North Antiguan, South Antiguan, and Barbudan. South Antiguan Creole is primarily spoken in Saint Mary and the village of Swetes, collectively known as "Round South". This part of Antigua is dominated by the Shekerley Mountains, significantly isolating it from the island's centre of population where North Antiguan Creole is primarily spoken. Barbudan Creole is only spoken in Barbuda and by the Barbudans.

In Saint Kitts and Nevis, their single dialect is spoken throughout the country, and is heavily spoken in the region of Capesterre. The Anguillan dialect is significantly influenced by other English creoles due to its geographic isolation, and Montserrat Creole is among the closest dialects to North Antiguan.

== Phonology ==
Antiguan and Barbudan Creole vowel chart

Antiguan and Barbudan Creole has twenty-two consonants, ten vowels, two semi-vowels, and four diphthongs. Unique to the language are the diphthongs (gliding vowels) /ia/ (alternates with /ie/), /ua/ (alternates with /ua/), /ai/, and /ou/. Semi-vowels are phonetically vowels, but phonologically consonants. /w/ and /j/ are the two semi-vowels. Below is a table of the consonants in Antiguan and Barbudan Creole:

		Labial	Alveolar	Post- alveolar	Palatal	Velar	Glottal
Nasal		m	n			ŋ	
Plosive/ affricate	voiceless	p	t	t͡ʃ	c	k	
Plosive/ affricate	voiced	b	d	d͡ʒ	ɟ	ɡ	
Fricative	voiceless	f	s	ʃ			h
Fricative	voiced	v	z	ʒ			h
Approximant			l	ɹ	j	w	

Below is a table of vowels:

Vowels
	Front	Central	Back
Close	i iː		uː
Near-close	ɪ		ʊ
Mid	ɛ	ə	o ɔ ɔː
Open		ä äː	

A distinct feature of the creole is the alternation of certain sounds, such as /v/ alternating with /b/ in the word bex. English /tɹ/ and /dɹ/ alternate with the creole [t͡ʃ] and [d͡ʒ] in basilectal varieties. For example, "true" becomes [t͡ʃuː] (chuu) and "drink" becomes [d͡ʒɪŋk] (jingk). /h/ dropping is also common in the language, making the /h/ in words like "hair" or "head" silent. /h/ insertion, the opposite process, is exclusive to South Antiguan Creole. An example of this is in the word [häks] (hax), the South Antiguan word for "ask".

The palatalization of /k/ and /g/ and the insertion of /j/ glides is also common in words with three or less syllables. This first developed before consonants that preceded /a/ in Antiguan and Barbudan English. Examples include:

- [cäʃ] → kyash/cash ('cash')
- [cäːɹ] → kyaar/caar ('car')
- [cäɹɪbijən] → Kyaribiyan/Caribiyan ('Caribbean')
- [ɟäl] → gyal ('girl')
- [äɟuː] → agyuu ('argue')

The syllable in which the glide between a palatalized consonant and a vowel occurs always carries primary stress. Palatalized consonants are more common in rural, elderly speakers.

Optional nasalization is sometimes present in all vowels but /ə/. Examples include:

- [mɪ̃] → min' ('did')
- [ä̃] → an' ('and')

== Orthography ==
The language has traditionally been written using various respellings from standard English. At the Axarplex Institute, there is an Antiguan and Barbudan Language Academy with the aim to standardise the language, which developed the following orthography:

Consonants
IPA transcription	Letter
/p/	p
/b/	b
/t/	t
/k/	k
/ɡ/	g
/tʃ/	ch
/dʒ/	j
/f/	f
/v/	v
/s/	s
/z/	z
/ʃ/	sh
/ʒ/	zh
/m/	m
/n/	n
/ŋ/	ng
/l/	l
/ɹ/	r
/ks/	x
/h/	h
/d/	d
/kʃ/	xh
/c/	ky (c)
/ɟ/	gy

Vowels
IPA transcription	Letter
/i/	i
/iː/	ee (ë)
/ɪ/	i
/ɛ/	e
/ə/	a
/uː/	uu (ü)
/ʊ/	u
/ɔ/	o (aw)
/ɔː/	oo (aw)
/ä/	a
/äː/	aa (ä)
/o/	o

Diphthongs
IPA transcription	Letter
/ia/	ie
/eɪ/	ie
/ua/	ow
/aɪ/	ai
/oʊ/	ou

Semi-vowels
IPA transcription	Letter
/w/	w
/j/	y

== Vocabulary ==
Vocabulary is widely based on British vocabulary, due to centuries of association with Great Britain. Examples:

- Bonnet refers to the hood of a car.
- Chips refers to what in American English is called French Fries. However, fries is commonly used as well.
- Form is used instead of the American high school grade. (7th Grade-1st Form; 11th Grade-5th Form)
- Patty for flaky folded pastry, unlike the American patty, meaning hamburger patty
- Mongrel is used instead of the US mutt.
- Biscuit is used instead of the US cookie.

However, in other cases the American form prevails over the British one, due to the islands' close proximity to the United States:

- Apartment is used instead of the British flat.
- Elevator instead of the British lift.
- parking lot instead of car park.

Because of the influx of other Caribbean nationals to Antigua, due to natural migration and to the CSME, Antigua's everyday vocabulary is being influenced by Jamaican Creole, Bajan Creole, Guyanese Creole and Trinidadian Creole. This is even more common among the youth. Examples:

- Yute and star meaning young man.
- Breda (derived from Brethren and Partner) meaning close friend.
- Sell off meaning excellent or very good.

=== Notable lexical items ===
Creole	English	IPA
aata	after	[äːtə]
a die ee die	there it is	[ä deɪ iː deɪ]
a wa duu	how are you?	[ä wä duː]
a na	it's not	[ä nä]
a chuu	it's true	[ä tʃuː]
baakl	bottle	[bäːkl]
bakra	white person, slave master	[bäːkɹə]
bex	to be upset	[bɛks]
bie	beach	[beɪ]
biesaid	seaside or beach	[beɪsaɪd]
kyaakl/caakl	cattle	[cäːkl]
Dadli	Antigua	[dädli]
ee bang gud	it tastes good	[iː bäŋ gʊd]
ebriting	everything	[ɛbɹitɪŋ]
fig	banana	[fɪg]
konchi	country	[kɔntʃiː]
korukl	stuff, paraphernalia, apparatus	[kɔɹʊkl]
kranana	nothing	[kɹänänä]
kurant	electricity	[kʊɹənt]
kuu	look	[kuː]
meegou	Arab	[miːgoʊ]
naiga	person, people	[neɪgə]
nutin	nothing	[nʊtɪn]
nyam	to eat	[njäm]
pikinaiga	children	[pɪkɪneɪgə]
pikni	child	[pɪkni]
Raabak	Antiguan and Barbudan Creole	[ɹäːbäk]
sweet ail	cooking oil	[swiːt aɪl]
valeez	a small suitcase	[vəliːz]
vilij	village	[vɪlɪdʒ]
yaad	ones house or home	[yäːd]

The following text was published in Antigua and the Antiguans in 1844 in the Saint Kitts dialect:

Old creole text	Modern creole	English
You no I tould you how it wood be, but you all ways were a wild nagur, and wood neber hear reeson, and lubbed to follow your hedstrong ways. But now you are suffering for it, an I hope you’ll repent, as good Massa Parson says. You nuo you had no right to run away and leabe you yong pic’nees here to starbe. It was a most wicked act, but I ’spose the Capen who took you away will be made to support ’em as he ought.	Yu nuo mi tel yu au ee wud bi, bot yu aalweiz min wan wail naiga, an wud neba eer reezin, an min lub fu falou fuyu edtraang wie. Bot nau yu a sufa fu um, an mi uop yu repen, az gud Maasa Paasan sie. Yu nuo yu ab no rait fu go agwasa an leeb fuyu yong pikinaiga ya fu taab. Um min wan wikidwikid ting fu duu, bot mi tink de kyaapm hu tek yu awie wi hafu elp um az ee tink.	You know, I told you how it would be, but you always were a wild person, and you would never hear reason, and you loved to follow your self-centred ways. But now it causes you suffering, and I hope you'll repent, as the good Master Pastor says. You know you had no right to run away and leave your young children here to starve. It was a very wicked act, but I suppose the Captain who took you away will be forced to support him as he ought to.

== Grammar ==
The grammar of Antiguan and Barbudan Creole is primarily based on the substrates, the Kwa languages. The language has two articles: wan (indefinite article; "a", "an") and de/di (definite article), both derived etymologically from English. The demonstrative pronouns are dis ("this"), dat ("that"), and dem ("them"). These pronouns can also combine with other morphemes, making alternates disya (lit. "this here"), datdey/datdie (lit. "that there"), demya (lit. "them here"), and demdey/demdie (lit. "them there"). Mass nouns cannot take a plural marker or an indefinite article. Pronouns may be preceded by a definite article to emphasize. Most adjectives are placed before the noun they modify. The adjectives man ("man") and uuman ("woman") can be used to gender a noun, including animals– for example, uumandaag (lit. "woman dog"). There is no gender agreement in the language however. In basilect, possession can be indicated by either placing the possessor before the possessed or using a ("of"), for example naiga a Jaan ("John's people"; lit. "people of John").

The language has a complex tense and aspect system. Past tense is marked by min, for example: mi min nyam ("I ate"). Future tense is marked by either go, a go, wi, or wil. For example, mi go nyam ("I will eat"). Present tense is unmarked, for example: shi nyam ("she eats"). Aspect is primarily distinguished between perfective and imperfective. Perfective is not marked, while imperfective is marked by a. An example of perfective is mi nyam ("I have eaten"). There are two categories within imperfective, habitual actions and progressive actions. Habitual is usually unmarked, for example: hi lib wid mi ("he lives with me"), while progressive is marked with a: mi a nyam ("I am eating"). There is also completive aspect, marked by dun/don: mi dun nyam ("I have eaten"; lit. "I done eat"). Negation is marked by na ("not"), in a distinct manner from English.

=== Pronominal system ===
The pronominal system of Standard English has a four-way distinction of person, singular/plural, gender and nominative/objective. Some varieties of Antiguan Creole do not have the gender or nominative/objective distinction, though most do. Unlike English, the language distinguishes between the second person singular and plural (you).

- I, me = mi;
- you, you (thou, thee) = yu;
- he, him = hi/he/ee/i;
- she, her = shi;
- we, us = aawi;
- you all = aayu; (Note: unu is sometimes used in Barbuda to impolitely refer to children)
- they, them = dem;
- it, its = um/am/om;

To form the possessive form of the pronoun add "fu-" to the above.

- my, mine = fumi;
- your, yours (thy, thine) = fuyu;
- his, his = fuhi;
- her, hers = fushi;
- our, ours = (fu)aawi;
- you all = (fu)aayu;
- their, theirs = fudem
- its = fu'um (rare)

Example:

1. a fuyu daag dat?, is that your dog?
2. a fuyu daag dat dei na, that is your dog.

== Language use ==
Antiguan Creole is used in almost every aspect of life in Antigua. In all schools, during class hours, it is required of students to speak Standard English. This policy is especially exercised in private owned schools. Most media and mainstream communication is written and spoken in Standard English, although Antiguan Creole is sometimes used humorously or as a way of identifying with the local public.

Use of Antiguan Creole varies depending on socio-economic class. In general, the higher and middle classes use it amongst friends and family but switch to Standard English in the public sphere. The lower class tend to use Antiguan Creole in almost every sector of life. Part of this discrepancy dates back to the Creole's inception. Ever since Antiguan Creole first came into existence it was used as a means to identify with a given group. For example, as more slaves entered the island, indentured servants and slaves had less contact with white plantation owners as the economy moved to a larger-scale. While these two groups interacted and a Creole emerged as the two groups had to communicate and interact, indentured servants tried to speak the 'Standard English' with increased frequency in order to associate with people at the top of the hierarchy for whom 'Standard English' was the norm. Conversely, for slaves, speaking the Creole was a symbol of identity.

== See also ==
- Antiguan and Barbudan English
- Languages of Antigua and Barbuda
- Nigerian Pidgin English
- Krio language
