= Dominican Creole =

French-based creole of Dominica

- Kwéyòl Dominik
- [kwéyòl, patwa]
- Native to: Dominica
- Native speakers: (43,000 cited 1998)
- Language family: French-African Creole: Circum-Caribbean French; Antillean Creole; Dominican Creole

Language codes
- ISO 639-3: acf
- Glottolog: None
- ELP: NE
- Linguasphere: 51-AAC-ccg
- IETF: cpf-DM

Dominican Creole French is a French-based creole language widely spoken in Dominica. It can be considered a distinct dialect of Antillean Creole.

== History ==
It is a sub-variety of Antillean Creole, which is spoken in other islands of the Lesser Antilles and is very closely related to the varieties spoken in Martinique, Guadeloupe, Saint Lucia, Grenada and parts of Trinidad and Tobago. The intelligibility rate with speakers of other varieties of Antillean Creole is almost 100%. Its syntactic, grammatical and lexical features are virtually identical to those of Martinican Creole, though, like its Saint Lucian counterpart, it includes more English loanwords than the Martinican variety. People who speak Haitian Creole can also understand Dominican Creole French; although there are a number of distinctive features they are mutually intelligible.

Like the other French-based creole languages in the Caribbean, Dominican French Creole is primarily French-derived vocabulary, with African and Carib influences to its syntax. In addition, many expressions reflect the presence of an English influence in the language in not just loan words, but in some of the pragmatic markers present.

In 1635, the French seized Guadeloupe and Martinique and began establishing sugar colonies. Until 1690 Dominica had not been successfully colonized. By 1690, lumberjacks (English and French) arrived in Dominica for its forest resources. Subsequently, French from Martinique and Guadeloupe and their slaves settled in Dominica, establishing small farms producing coffee, cotton, wood, and tobacco. Dominican Creole developed among the slaves, originally as a mixture of the Creoles from Guadeloupe and Martinique, further enriched with Amerindian and English words. Even after becoming an English colony, the underdevelopment of the road system on the island hindered for a long time the spread of English, the official language of the country, to isolated villages, where Creole remained the only spoken language.

== Kwéyòl pronouns ==
English	Creole	Remarks
I	Mon, Mwen, An	The three forms are perfectly synonymous.
You (singular)	Ou/Vou	
He/she	I	Creole has a neutral pronoun that can be synonymous with "him" or "her".
He	Misyé	Example: Misyé pa djè ni tan (he hardly has much time).
She (unmarried girl)	Manmzèl	Example: Manmzèl pa djè enmen jwé (she does not like playing much).
We	Nou	
You (plural)	Zòt, Zò	This is not a "you" of familiarity. "Zò" is used in Guadeloupe.
They	Yo	Example: Yo ka jwé (they play).

== Kwéyòl alphabet ==
Créole	IPA Transcription	Standard pronunciation
g	g	hard "G", as in good.
h	h	Pronounced like "H" in ham.
i	i	Pronounced like "ee" as in see.
j	ʒ	Pronounced as French J.
k	k	Replaces hard "C", "Qu". Sounds like "K" in kick.
w	w	"W" replaces "R" in some words derived from French, but in Creole, they are two different letters.
s	s	Replaces the soft "C" and is pronounced like "S" in soft.
y	j	Pronounced like "Yuh", as in yuck.
z	z	Replaces "S" when used between vowels. Pronounced like "Z", as in zebra.
an	ɑ̃	nasalized sound used in French. Does not exist in English.
àn	an	Pronounced as a not nasalized sound with an emphasis on the "N" or "ane" in English.
ann	ɑ̃n	A nasalized French "an" with a long "n" sound.
anm	ɑ̃m	A nasalized French "an" with a long "m" sound. Pronounced like "ahmm".
ay	aj	Pronounced like "eye" in English.
in	in	Never nasalized.
en	ɛ̃	Always nasalized.
enn	ɛ̃n	Pronounced like "en" in garden.
on	ɔ̃	Sound does not exist in English. It is a nasal on, like the one used in French.
onm	ɔ̃m	Nasal sound + M.
onn	ɔ̃n	Nasal sound + N.
ch	ʃ	Pronounced like "Sh" in English.
a	a	Pronounced like a short "a", like in cat.
b	b	Pronounced like B in English.
f	f	Pronounced as F in English.
d	d	Pronounced as D in English, like in dog.
m	m	Pronounced as M in English, like man.
n	n	Pronounced as N in English, like never.
ò	ɔ	Pronounced as "or" as in more.
r	w, ɤ, ɹ	Often replaced by W in beginnings of words, but pronounced as racquet.
p	p	Pronounced as in pea
t	t	Pronounced as in tea
v	v	Pronounced as in volcano

== Articles ==
Definite articles comes after the noun in Creole, unlike in French where they always precede the noun. "La" follows nouns that end with a consonant or "y". When a noun ends with a vowel, it is followed by "a" only.

Nonm-la	The Man
Fanm-la	The Woman
Payay-la	the Papaya
Lawi-a	The Street
Zaboka-a	The Avocado

== Numbers ==
=== Cardinal ===
0	Nòt/Zéwo
1	yon
2	dé
3	twa
4	kat
5	senk
6	sis
7	sèt
8	wit
9	nèf

10	dis
11	wonz
12	douz
13	twèz
14	katòz
15	kinz\tjenz
16	Sèz
17	disèt
18	dizwit
19	diznèf

20	ven
21	ventéyon
22	venndé
23	venntwa
24	vennkat
25	vennsenk
26	vennsis
27	vennsèt
28	venntwit
29	ventnèf

30	twant
31	twantéyon
32	twantdé
33	twantwa
34	twantkat
35	twantsenk
36	twantsis
37	twantsèt
38	twantwit
39	twantnèf

40	kawant
41	kawantéyon
42	kawantdé
43	kawantwa
44	kawantkat
45	kawantsenk
46	kawantsis
47	kawantsèt
48	kawantwit
49	kawantnèf

50	senkant
51	senkantéyon
52	senkantdé
53	senkantwa
54	senkantkat
55	senkantsenk
56	senkantsis
57	senkantsèt
58	senkantwit
59	senkantnèf

60	swasant
61	swasantéyon
62	swasantdé
63	swasantwa
64	swasantkat
65	swasantsenk
66	swasantsis
67	swasantsèt
68	swasantwit
69	swasantnèf

70	swasantdis
71	swasantwonz
72	swasantdouz
73	swasanttwèz
74	swasantkatòz
75	swasantkenz
76	swasantsèz
77	swasantdisèt
78	swasantdizwit
79	swasantdiznèf

80	katwèven
81	katwèventéyon
82	katwèvendé
83	katwèventwa
84	katwèvenkat
85	katwèvensenk
86	katwèvensis
87	katwèvensèt
88	katwèvenwit
89	katwèvennèf

90	katwèvendis
91	katwèvenwonz
92	katwèvendouz
93	katwèventwèz
94	katwèvenkatòz
95	katwèvenkenz
96	katwèvensèz
97	katwèvendisèt
98	katwèvendizwit
99	katwèvendiznèf

100	san
200	dé san
300	twa san
400	kat san
500	senk san
600	sis san
700	sèt san
800	wit san
900	nèf san
1 000	mil

2 000	dé mil
3 000	twa mil
4 000	kat mil
5 000	senk mil
6 000	sis mil
7 000	sèt mil
8 000	sit mil
9 000	nèf mil
10 000	di mil
100 000	san mil

200 000	dé san mil
300 000	twa san mil
400 000	kat san mil
500 000	senk san mil
600 000	sis san mil
700 000	sèt san mil
800 00	wit san mil
900 000	nèf san mil

- 1 000 000 = yon milyon
- 1 000 000 000 = yon milya
- 1 234 = yon mil + dé san + twantkat
- 30 153 = twant mil + san + senkantwa
- 412 489 = (kat san douz) mil + kat san + katwèvennèf
- 12 356 734 = (douz) milyon + (twa san+senkantsis) mil + sèt san+twantkat

=== Ordinal ===
- 1st = pwémyè
- 2nd = dézyènm
- 3rd = twazyènm
- 4th = katriyènm
- 5th = senkyènm
- 6th = sizyènm (Notice the second "s" in "sis" is pronounced as a "z")
- 7th = sètyènm
- 8th = wityènm
- 9th = nèvyènm (Notice the "f" in "nèf" is pronounced as a "v")

All the other ordinal numbers are formed as number + [yènm]

== See also ==
- Kokoy
- Antillean Creole
- Grenadian Creole French
- Saint Lucian Creole French
- Haitian Creole
- World Creole Music Festival
- Guadeloupean Creole
