= Guyanese Creole =

English-based creole language spoken in Guyana

- Creolese
- Native to: Guyana
- Region: Guianas
- Native speakers: 643,000 in Guyana (2021); 68,000 in Suriname (2018)
- Language family: English Creole: Atlantic; Eastern; Southern; Guyanese Creole

Language codes
- ISO 639-3: gyn
- Glottolog: creo1235
- Linguasphere: 52-ABB-av

Guyanese Creole (Creolese by its speakers or simply Guyanese) is an English-based creole language spoken in various forms by the majority of Guyanese people. It emerged during the Atlantic Slave Trade among enslaved Africans who were brought to Dutch, and later, British Guiana from West and Central Africa, between the mid-1600s and 1834. Many of these Africans arrived via the Caribbean islands of Barbados, and the Leeward Islands. As a result, Guyanese Creole shares key features with other Afro-Caribbean English-based creoles, particularly those of the Eastern Caribbean. It contains many African retentions and has loan words from indigenous-American languages, as well as Hindustani due to Indian acculturation.

== Varieties and influences ==
There are many sub-dialects of Guyanese Creole based on geographical location, urban/rural location, and race of the speakers. For example, along the Rupununi River, where the population is largely Amerindian, a distinct form of Creole exists. The Georgetown (capital city) urban area has a distinct accent, while within a forty-five-minute drive away from this area the dialect/accent changes again, especially if following the coast where rural villages are located.

WIKITONGUES - Sandra speaking English and Guyanese Creole

As with other Caribbean languages, words and phrases are very elastic, and new ones can be made up, changed or evolve within a short period. They can also be used within a very small group, until picked up by a larger community. Ethnic groups are also known to alter or include words from their own backgrounds.

A socially stratified creole speech continuum also exists between Guyanese English and Standard / British English. Speech by members of the upper classes is phonetically closest to British and American English, whereas speech by members of the lower classes most closely resembles other Caribbean English dialects. A phrase such as "I told him" may be pronounced in various parts of the continuum:

Utterance	Represents the speech of
[ai tɔuld hɪm]	acrolect speech of upper-class speakers
[ai toːld hɪm]	mesolect varieties of speech of middle-class speakers
[ai toːl ɪm]	mesolect varieties of lower-middle and urban class speakers
[ai tɛl ɪm]	mesolect varieties of lower-middle and urban class speakers
[a tɛl ɪm]	mesolect varieties of lower-middle and urban class speakers
[ai tɛl ɪ]	mesolect varieties of lower-middle and urban class speakers
[a tɛl i]	mesolect varieties of lower-middle and urban class speakers
[mi tɛl i]	rural working class
[mi tɛl am]	basilect speech of illiterate rural laborers

== Grammar ==
=== Nouns ===
Definite nouns are pluralized with dem.

puliis → {puliis dem}
policeman {} policemen

=== Adjectives and adverbs ===
It is common in Guyanese Creole to repeat adjectives and adverbs for emphasis (the equivalent of adding "very" or "extremely" in standard British and American English). For example, "Dis wata de col col" translates into "This water is very cold". "Come now now" translates into "Come right now".

== Phonology ==
There are several phonological markers that are present in Guyanese Creole which are isomorphic with the Jamaican phoneme system:

- Th-stopping
- Cluster reduction
- Avoidance of [ʃ], [ʒ], [f], [v] phonemes
- H dropping
- Semivowels
- Non-rhoticity among older speakers

== Sample words and phrases ==
The following phrases are written as they are pronounced:

- ah go do it or meh guh do am – Meaning: "I will do it"
- dem ah waan sting yuh waan bil – Literally: "they want to sting your one bill" – "they usually want to take money from you"
- evri day me a run a raisfil – Literally: "Every day I run the ricefield" - "Every day I take care of the ricefield"
- ee bin get gun – Literally: "He been get gun" – "he had the gun"
- ee wuda tek awi lil time but awi bin go come out safe – Meaning: "it would have taken us a little time but we would have come out safely"
- me a wuk abak – Meaning: "I'm working further inland"
- suurin – A form of courtship (from "suitoring", itself the result of adapting the noun "suitor" for use as a verb and then applying standard patterns to generate a gerund form)

== Public perception ==
Although Guyanese Creole is spoken by all ethnic groups in Guyana today, it is rooted in the lived experience of Afro-Guyanese during slavery. Indian, Chinese, and Portuguese immigrants adopted the language after coming in contact with the Creole people.

The Indo-Guyanese, in particular, acculturated Guyanese creole from the then-majority Afro-Guyanese population after arriving in the period following emancipation. Over time, as Indian indentured laborers became the demographic majority, Creole-speaking Indo-Guyanese came to outnumber the Afro-Guyanese population. As a result, Guyanese creole is no longer widely recognized to be native to Afro-Guyanese culture. In the dominant cultural narrative, it is simply an aspect of national identity or regional Caribbean culture, rather than a cultural product of the Creole people themselves and their historical struggle for survival under racial oppression.

While some Afro-Guyanese take pride in creole, many do not perceive it as a distinct language to be claimed and preserved. Among the general Guyanese population, it is still seen as merely improper English and a sign of low-education, due to colonial legacy.

== See also ==
- Nation language
- Jamaican patois
- Trinidadian Creole
- Tobagonian Creole
- Sranan Tongo
- Creole language
- Spanglish
