= Kokoy =

Variety of Antiguan and Barbudan Creole from Dominica

- Region: Northeastern Dominica
- Language family: English-African Creole: Guinea Coast Creole English; Caribbean Creole English; Eastern Caribbean; Gullah–Nevis–Antigua; Antiguan and Barbudan Creole; Kokoy

Official status
- Regulated by: Kokoy Committee

Language codes
- ISO 639-3: –
- IETF: aig-DM
- The Kokoy-speaking world: regions where Kokoy is the language of the majority regions where Kokoy is the language of a significant minority

Kokoy is a variety of Antiguan and Barbudan Creole spoken in northeast Dominica by descendants of Antiguan and Montserratian settlers. It is primarily spoken in the villages of Wesley, Marigot, and Woodford Hill. It has since spread throughout the country to become the island's main English-based creole, although Pauline Christie also states that there are noticeable distinctions between a Dominican English Creole of Roseau and Kokoy. The settlers who spoke the language were originally employed on many of the island's plantations, and were mostly Methodist. Kokoy developed in the late 19th century. It is distinct from Dominican Creole French.
