= South Antiguan Creole =

Creole spoken in southern Antigua

- Saut Aanteegan / Sutn dialek
- Region: Saint Mary, Swetes
- Native speakers: ~6,800 (in Antigua and Barbuda; 2011 estimate)
- Language family: English Creole: Antiguan and Barbudan Creole; South Antiguan Creole

Language codes
- ISO 639-3: –
- regions where South Antiguan Creole is the language of the majority

South Antiguan Creole is a variety of Antiguan and Barbudan Creole spoken primarily in the southwestern regions of Antigua ("Round South"). It is only semi-intelligible with the rest of the language, and the dialect is mainly spoken by older generations. Its usage is generally looked down upon by speakers of the more dominant North Antiguan Creole. There is less influence from English and other creoles. Its distinctive pronouns are om (it) and i (he/she) for the third person singular, as well as the absence of the pronoun hi (he).

It is possibly related to Sranan Tongo due to that fled from the dissolution of Willoughbyland. There was also an Antiguan Maroon population in the Round South area.

== Promonial system ==
South Antiguan Creole has a distinct pronominal system from North Antiguan:

- Me - I, me
- Aawi - we, us, our
- Yu - you
- Aayu - you all
- I - he, she
- Om - him, her
- Dem - they, them
