= English-based creole languages =

Creole language derived from the English language

An English-based creole language (often shortened to English creole) is a creole language for which English was the lexifier, meaning that at the time of its formation the vocabulary of English served as the basis for the majority of the creole's lexicon. Most English creoles were formed in British colonies, following the great expansion of British naval military power and trade in the 17th, 18th, and 19th centuries. The main categories of English-based creoles are Atlantic (the Americas and Africa) and Pacific (Asia and Oceania).

Over 76.5 million people globally are estimated to speak an English-based creole. Sierra Leone, Nigeria, Ghana and Jamaica have the largest concentrations of Creole speakers.

== Origin ==
It is disputed to what extent the various English-based creoles of the world share a common origin. The monogenesis hypothesis posits that a single language, commonly called proto–Pidgin English, spoken along the West African coast in the early sixteenth century, was ancestral to most or all of the Atlantic creoles (the English creoles of both West Africa and the Americas).

== Table of creole languages ==
Name	Spoken in	Number of speakers	Notes
=== Atlantic ===
==== Western Caribbean ====
Bahamian Creole	Bahamas	328,000 (2018)	
Turks and Caicos Creole English	Turks and Caicos	34,400 (2019)	
Bay Islands English	Honduras	22,500 (2001)	
Jamaican Patois	Jamaica	3,043,280 (2001)	
Belizean Creole	Belize	170,000 (2014)	
Miskito Coast Creole	Nicaragua	18,400 (2009)	Dialect: Rama Cay Creole
Limonese Creole	Costa Rica	55,100 (2013)	Dialect of Jamaican Patois
Bocas del Toro Creole	Panama	268,000 (2000)	Dialect of Jamaican Patois
San Andrés–Providencia Creole	Colombia	12,000 (1981)	Dialect of Jamaican Patois
==== Eastern Caribbean ====
Virgin Islands Creole	US Virgin Islands; British Virgin Islands; Sint Maarten; Puerto Rico; Saint-Martin; Sint Eustatius; Saba	89,700 (2019)	
Anguillan Creole	Anguilla	11,500 (2001)	Dialect of Antiguan and Barbudan Creole
Barbudan Creole	Antigua and Barbuda	1,400 (2011)	Dialect of Antiguan and Barbudan Creole
North Antiguan Creole	Antigua and Barbuda	48,000 (2011)	Dialect of Antiguan and Barbudan Creole
South Antiguan Creole	Antigua and Barbuda	6,800 (2011)	Dialect of Antiguan and Barbudan Creole
Saint Kitts Creole	Saint Kitts and Nevis	51,000 (2015)	Dialect of Antiguan and Barbudan Creole
Montserrat Creole	Montserrat	5,130 (2020)	Dialect of Antiguan and Barbudan Creole
Kokoy	Dominica	unknown, growing	Dialect of Antiguan and Barbudan Creole
Vincentian Creole	Saint Vincent and the Grenadines	108,000 (2016)	
Grenadian Creole	Grenada	107,000 (2020)	
Tobagonian Creole	Trinidad and Tobago	300,000 (2011)	
Trinidadian Creole	Trinidad and Tobago	1,000,000 (2011)	
Bajan Dialect	Barbados	257,000 (2018)	
Guyanese Creole	Guyana	715,200 (2021)	
Sranan Tongo	Suriname	669,600 (2016–2018)	Including 150,000 L2 users
Saramaccan	Suriname	34,500 (2018)	
Ndyuka	Suriname	67,800 (2018)	Dialects: Aluku, Paramaccan
Kwinti	Suriname	250 (2018)	
==== Southern-Caribbean ====
Venezuelan English Creole	Venezuela	unknown, likely endangered (2018)	
San Nicolaas English	Aruba	15,000 (estimation) (2020)	Spoken in San Nicolaas, Aruba
==== North America ====
Gullah	United States	300 (2023)	Ethnic population: 250,000
Afro-Seminole Creole	United States; Mexico	200 (1990) (Note: According to Encyclopedia Britannica, Black Seminoles have also been known as Seminole Maroons or Seminole Freedmen and were a group of free blacks and runaway slaves who joined with a group of Native Americans in Florida after the Spanish abolished slavery there in 1793.)	Dialect of the Gullah language
==== West Africa ====
Krio / Sierra Leonean Criole	Sierra Leone	7,800,000 (2021)	Including 6,900,000 L2 speakers
Kreyol/Kolokwa	Liberia	5,113,000 (2015/2021)	Including 5,000,000 L2 speakers
Kru English / Ghanaian Pidgin	Ghana	5,002,000 (2011/2013)	Including 5,000,000 L2 speakers
Naijá / Nigerian Pidgin	Nigeria	120,650,000 (2020)	Including 116,000,000 L2 users
Wes Cos / Kamtok / Cameroonian Pidgin	Cameroon	12,000,000 (2017)	
Pichinglis / Equatorial Guinean Pidgin	Equatorial Guinea	76,000 (2011)	Including 70,000 L2 users
=== Pacific ===
Hawaiian Pidgin (Note: Although Hawaii is part of the United States, Hawaiian Pidgin is mostly considered as a Pacific creole language rather than Atlantic, this is further mentioned in John Holm's "An Introduction to Pidgins and Creoles". Therefore, it does not have to follow its political boundaries on being a U.S. state.)	Hawaii, United States	600,000 (2015)	Including 400,000 L2 users
Ngatikese Creole	Micronesia	700 (1983)	
Tok Pisin	Papua New Guinea	4,125,740	Including 4,000,000 L2 users (2001)
Pijin	Solomon Islands	564,000 (2012–2019)	530,000 L2 users (1999)
Bislama	Vanuatu	12,570 (2011)	
Pitcairn-Norfolk	Pitcairn; Norfolk Island	1,786	Almost no L2 users. Has been classified as an Atlantic Creole based on internal structure.
Australian Kriol	Australia	17,160 (1991/2021)	Including 10,000 L2 users
Torres Strait Creole	Australia	6,170 (2016)	
Bonin English	Bonin Islands, Japan	Possibly 1,000–2000 (2004)	

== Marginal ==
- Bonin English, sometimes considered a mixed language
- Iyaric ("Rastafarian")
- Jamaican Maroon Spirit Possession Language

== Other ==
Not strictly creoles, but sometimes called thus:

- Bay Islands English
- Cayman Islands English

== See also ==
- List of English-based pidgins
- Middle English creole hypothesis
- World Englishes
- Belter Creole
