= North Antiguan Creole =

Creole spoken in northern Antigua

- Nawt Aanteegan / Nawtan dialek
- Region: North Antigua
- Native speakers: ~48,000 (in Antigua and Barbuda; 2011 estimate)
- Language family: English Creole: Antiguan and Barbudan Creole; North Antiguan Creole

Language codes
- ISO 639-3: –
- regions where North Antiguan Creole is the language of the majority

North Antiguan Creole is a variety of Antiguan and Barbudan Creole spoken primarily in the northern regions of Antigua. It is considered to be the most prestigious natural variety of the language, and the dialect has spread throughout the country due to the increasing number of people who commute to St. John's. Its distinctive pronouns are "hi" and "i" for the third person singular, as well as the absence of the pronoun "om".

== Pronominal system ==
North Antiguan Creole has a distinct pronominal system from South Antiguan:

- Mi - I, me
- Aawi - we, us, our
- Yu - you
- Aayu - you all
- Hi, i - he, him
- Shi - she, her
- Dem - they, them
