= Antiguan and Barbudan English =

Dialect of the English language used in Antigua and Barbuda

- Region: Antigua and Barbuda
- Language family: Indo-European: Germanic; West Germanic; North Sea Germanic; Anglo–Frisian; Anglic; English; Caribbean English; Antiguan and Barbudan English
- Early forms: Old English: Middle English; Early Modern English
- Dialects: Antiguan and Barbudan Creole
- Writing system: Latin (English alphabet); Unified English Braille

Official status
- Official language in: Antigua and Barbuda (de facto)

Language codes
- ISO 639-3: –
- Glottolog: None
- IETF: en-AG
- regions where Antiguan and Barbudan English is the language of the majority regions where Antiguan and Barbudan English is the language of a significant minority

Antiguan and Barbudan English (ABE) or Antiguan and Barbudan Standard English is a dialect of English used in Antigua and Barbuda. ABE co-exists with Antiguan and Barbudan Creole and is considered a Standard English rather than a creole, vernacular, or semi-creole. ABE is used in all educational and administrative circumstances.

== History ==
The English language was brought to Antigua and Barbuda by settlers in the 1620s. The first confirmed English settlement in Antigua and Barbuda was established in 1632. In 1674, the first sugar plantation was established in the country. This is when the first African slaves were brought to the country, and soon, the majority of people in Antigua and Barbuda were of African descent. When speakers of Antiguan English made contact with these Antiguan slaves, Antiguan and Barbudan Creole emerged.

During the colonial era, ABE remained the dominant dialect of English in Antigua and Barbuda, being used in official documents and in formal settings. By the twentieth-century, a culture of code-switching emerged, especially in the education system, where ABE was used as the official language of academic communication. When Antigua and Barbuda gained independence in 1981, the ability to read in English was mentioned in the Constitution as a requirement to serve in Parliament, but English was never mentioned as the official language. As of July 2025, no law in Antigua and Barbuda establishes ABE or any other language as official.

As of the last census in 2011, most immigrants living in Antigua and Barbuda come from an English-speaking country. This includes the top four countries that send immigrants to Antigua and Barbuda.

== Phonetics and phonology ==
The dialect is generally non-rhotic, and glottal stops are rare. Questions usually do not have the rising intonation that other dialects may have, and vowel length distinctions are less prominent. Open vowels are also present, and diphthongs have been known to be pronounced as monophthongs (time is /taːm/ and face is /fɛs/). Trap and bath may be pronounced with an open /a/ sound.

== Vocabulary ==
While ABE is influenced by British English, non-British terms are frequently used. Prominent examples include parking lot instead of car park and traveler instead of traveller. Additionally, other distinguishing terms may be used in various circumstances, such as bilbush for Phyllanthus epiphyllanthus, sling for liquid sugar, tango for meat from old cattle, and whitewood for Terminalia buceras. ABE has a large number of loanwords from Antiguan and Barbudan Creole, mostly to refer to local objects, although acrolectal Creole remains distinct from ABE. Code switching between ABE and Creole is referred to in Creole as prap taakin.

ABE is used by the government and all educational institutions. While genetically related to ABC, ABE is neither a creole nor a semi-creole.

ABE, rather than British English, is explicitly taught as a second language in Antiguan and Barbudan primary schools. Children are taught there is a clear distinction between ABE, local vernacular, and Antiguan and Barbudan Creole. Loanwords from ABC are considered to be in the same category as loanwords in English from other foreign languages. Only about six percent of the population, mostly expats, speak English as a native language. In place names, apostrophes are nearly always omitted, for example Bolan's becoming Bolans, Willikie's becoming Willikies, and Seaton's becoming Seatons. A notable exception is the largest city in the country, St. John's. -ze is generally preferred.

Most speakers of ABE are bilingual in Antiguan and Barbudan Creole, thus, certain acrolectal Creole terms may be used in informal or semi-formal contexts.

== See also ==
- Regional accents of English speakers
- Languages of Antigua and Barbuda
