= Culture of Antigua and Barbuda =

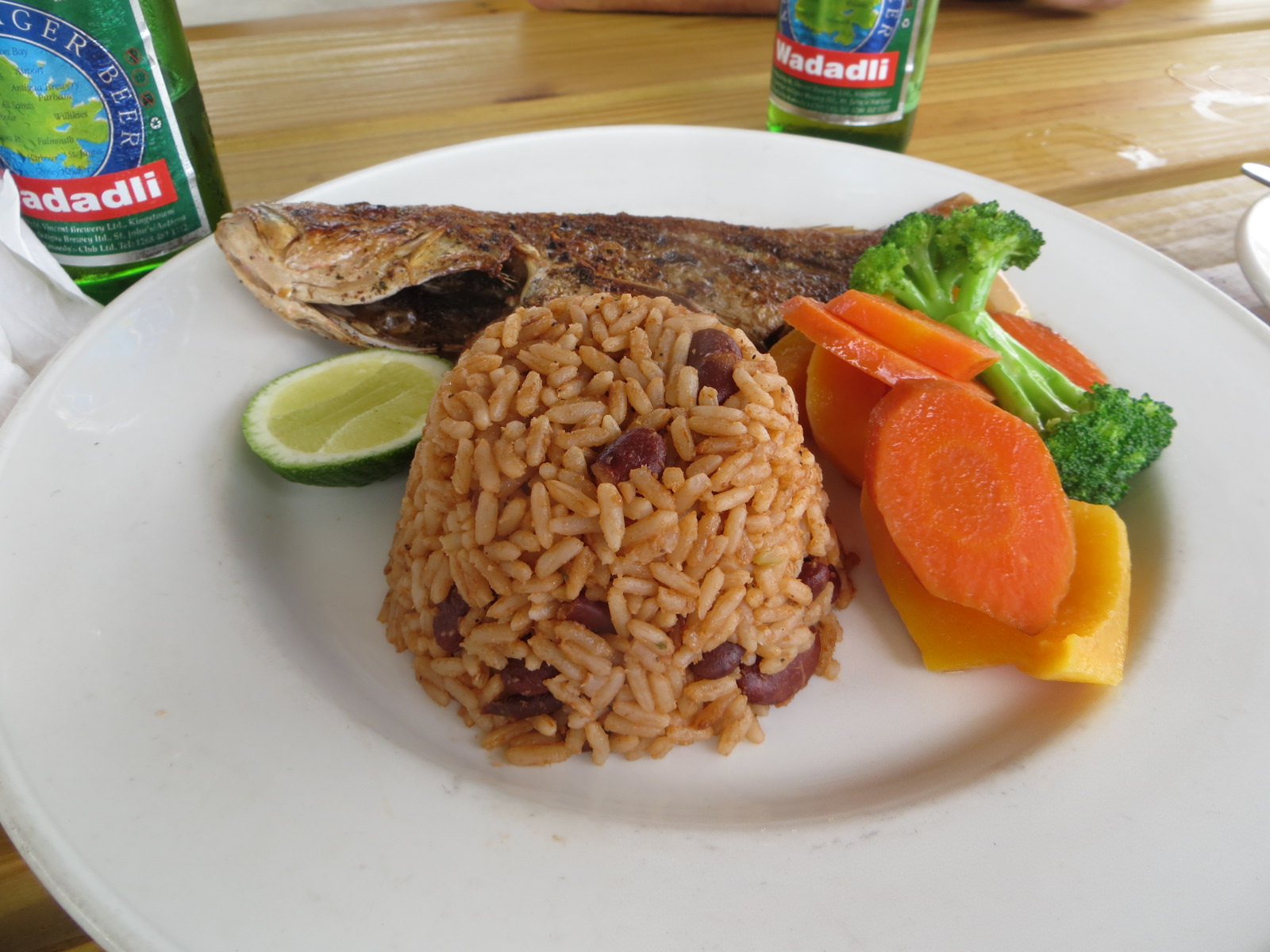
Antiguan food

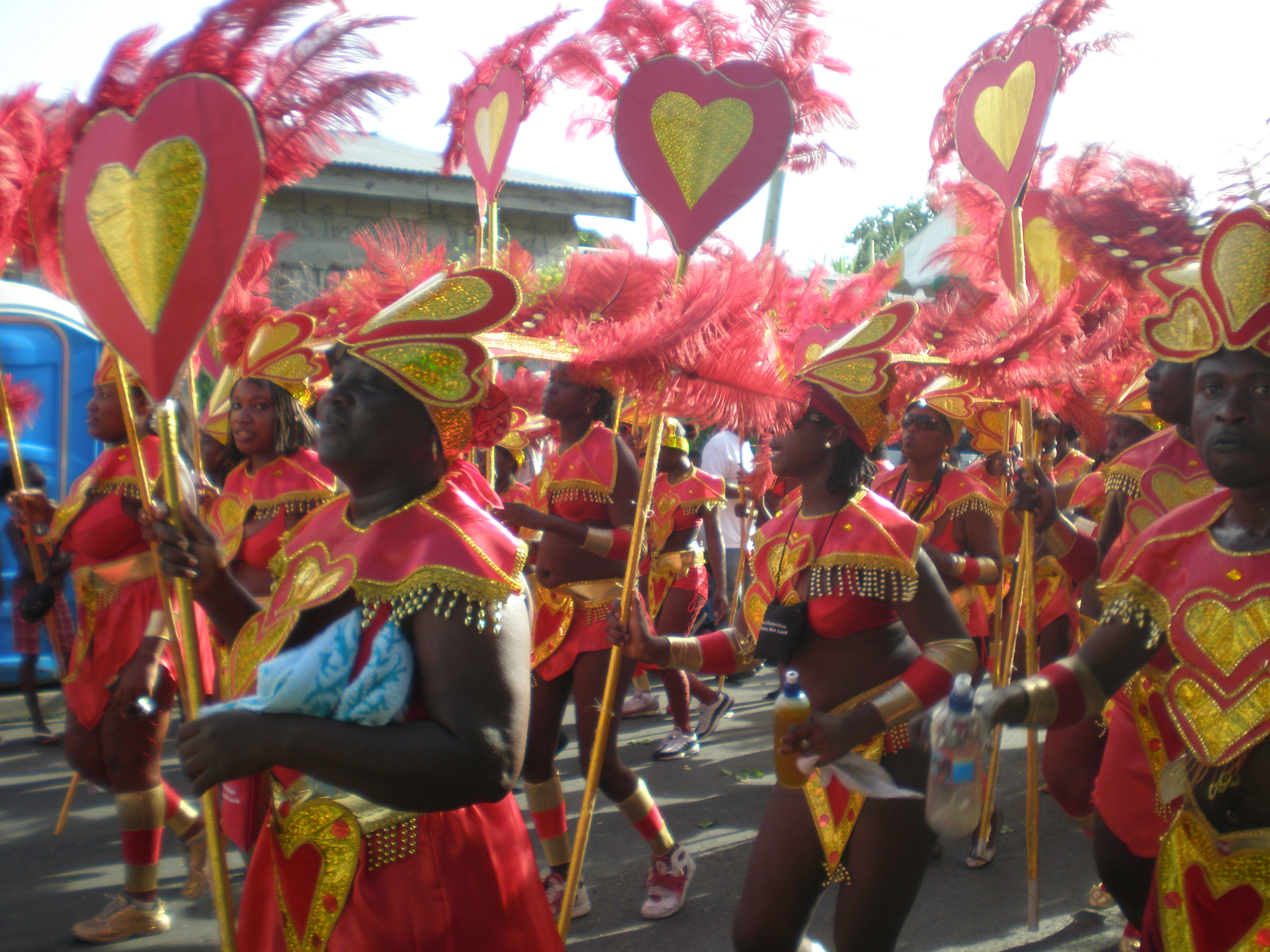
Antigua Carnival

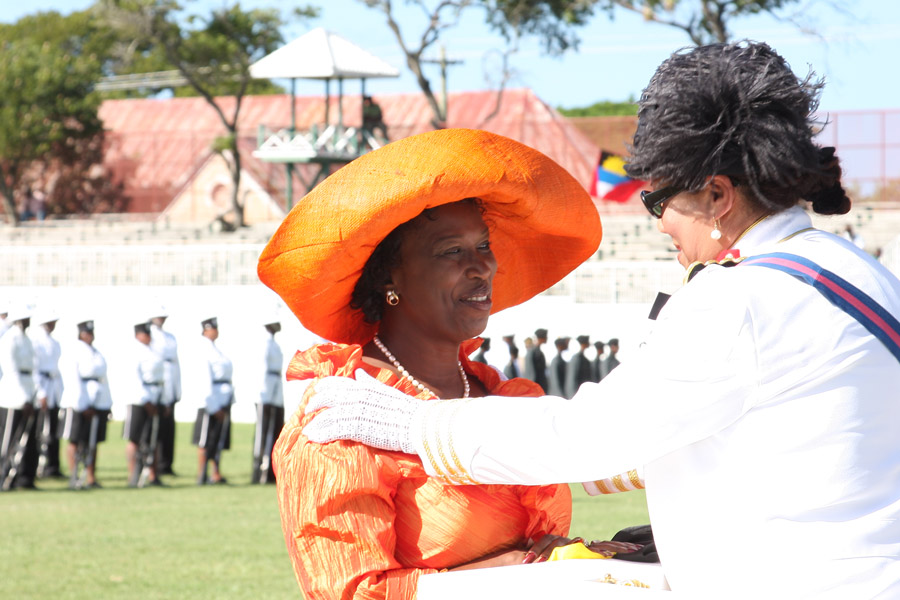
Award presented by Antigua and Barbuda Governor General

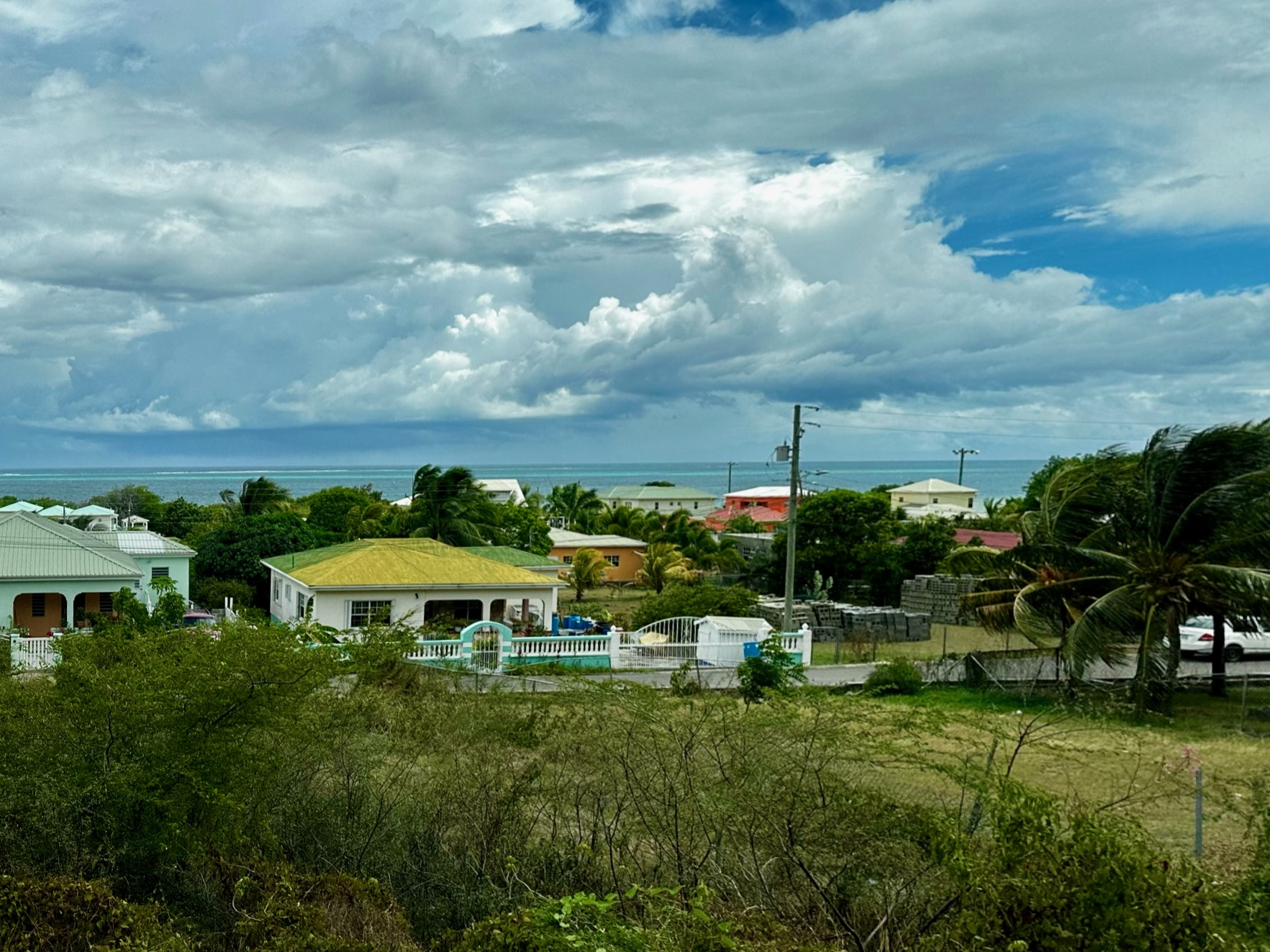
Typical Antiguan homes in Saint Mary

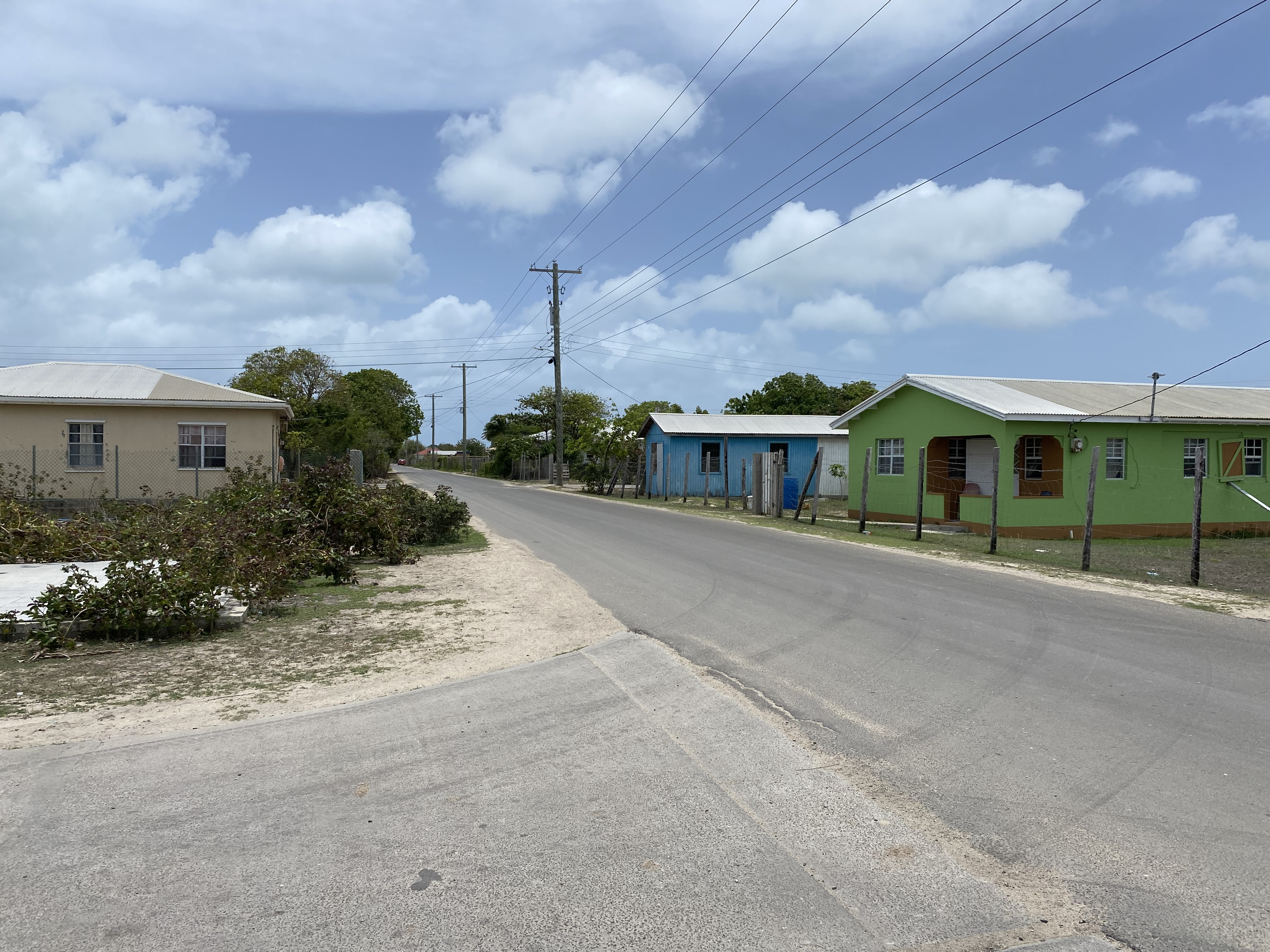
Typical Barbudan homes in Codrington

The traditions of West Africa and the United Kingdom have the biggest impact on the culture of Antigua and Barbuda. As a crucial component of its culture, Antigua and Barbuda also has its own creole language.

== Arts ==
The Arawak people, who lived in Antigua and Barbuda prior to the arrival of Europeans, were the first artists there. The earliest artwork in the nation, including petroglyphs and pictographs, was created by the Arawak people. It is thought that these artworks, which include geometric designs, animals, and plants, were used for religious or ceremonial purposes.

=== Music ===
Due to the fact that the majority of the population of Antigua and Barbuda descends from West Africans who were taken as slaves by Europeans, their music has predominantly an African character and has only had a small amount of influence from European forms. Christopher Columbus' 1493 sighting of Antigua, which was then inhabited by Arawak and Carib people, marked the first of recorded music in Antigua and Barbuda. Early music from the islands has, however, received scant research. There is historical evidence of African laborers dancing outdoors in the 1780s to the toombah (later tum tum), a drum embellished with shell and tin jingles, and the banjar (later bangoe, maybe linked to the banjo).

The majority of contemporary Antiguan and Barbudan musical genres were brought to the islands from France, the United Kingdom, the United States, Jamaica, and Trinidad. Highland fling and quadrille are two classic colonial dance forms that have been adapted for African audiences. The lack of a French colonial past (French islands of the Lesser Antilles retain much music and dance that is derived from Africa), the influence of the wealthy Codrington family, a relatively homogenous African ethnic identity, the absence of African immigration following the peak of slavery importation, the British military presence at Shirley Heights, and a recent history of unstable economy and government are all factors that contributed to the loss of Antiguan traditions.

An upbeat folk genre from Antigua called Benna (or Bennah) was created after slavery was outlawed. Call-and-response songs featuring a leader and an audience typically focused on racy and lewd rumors and gossip. Because of Benna's appeal and similarities to calypso, the island was more open to the introduction of that genre. King Short Shirt, a contemporary singer, has made an effort to revitalize the benna. His groundbreaking 1977 album Harambee started updating the benna with social and political awareness. It had developed into a popular means of communication by the turn of the 20th century, spreading information from all over the island.

== Festivals, entertainment, and events ==
=== Carnival ===
The Antiguan Carnival is a celebration of emancipation from slavery, held annually on the island of Antigua. It is a thirteen-day festival of colorful costumes, beauty pageants, talent shows, and music. The festival begins in late July and ends the first Tuesday in August, known as Carnival Tuesday. Both Carnival Monday and Carnival Tuesday are public holidays on the island. Antiguan Carnival replaced the Old Time Christmas Festival in 1957, with hopes of inspiring tourism in Antigua and Barbuda. Some elements of the Old Time Christmas Festival remain in the modern Carnival celebrations.

One of the biggest events of Antiguan Carnival is that of the j'ouvert (or juvé), in which brass and steel bands perform for much of the island's population, starting early in the morning. Other major events of Antiguan Carnival include the Party Monarch and Calypso Monarch competitions of Calypsonians, the Panorama steel band competition, the Parade of Bands, the Miss Antigua Pageant, and the Caribbean Queen's Competition. The festival also includes numerous smaller festivities, such as local concerts, food fairs, parades, and cultural shows.

=== Sailing ===
A week-long boat race called Antigua Sailing Week takes place in the waters near English Harbour in the parish of St. Paul's, Antigua. One of Antigua's most notable occasions is it. It was established in 1967 and is regarded as one of the top regattas in the world, averaging 100 yachts, 1500 competitors, and 5000 spectators each year. In its height, the occasion regularly drew 150–200 yachts. The event concludes with an official prize-giving ceremony presided over by the Governor-General at the end of the week. There are five main races held, including the English Harbour race.

Large sailing vessels compete in the Superyacht Cup, an annual sailing competition, in Nelson's Dockyard on the Caribbean island of Antigua. By the Superyacht Cup team from Palma, Majorca, it was first held in 2006.

== Cuisine ==
The cuisine is unique to Antigua and Barbuda and certain other Caribbean nations. The local food has evolved to include regional delicacies from other Caribbean nations, such as jerk meats from Jamaica or roti from Trinidad. The national meals of Antigua and Barbuda, Barbados, the British Virgin Islands, and the U.S. Virgin Islands all include cou-cou, also known as coo-coo (in the Windward Islands), or fungie (in the Leeward Islands and Dominica). Okra (ochroes) and cornmeal (corn flour) make up the majority of it. The Antigua, Saint Kitts and Nevis, and many more produce ducana, a sweet potato dumpling or pudding. They contain raisins, ginger, grated nutmeg, sweet potato and coconut that have been grated, sugar, flour, coconut milk and/or water, and essence or vanilla extract. The mixture is stirred in a bowl until a spoon can be dipped into it with ease. The cooking process is very straightforward, but the wrapping is frequently in dispute. The combination can be cooked wrapped in foil, although some people like to cook it wrapped in banana, seashore grape, or coccoloba leaves. The wrapped ingredients must be cooked in salted water for approximately 25 minutes, or until the mixture inside the wrapping is firm, whichever comes first.
