= Music of Antigua and Barbuda =

The music of Antigua and Barbuda is largely African in character, and has only felt a limited influence from European styles due to the population of Antigua and Barbuda descending mostly from West Africans who were made slaves by Europeans.

Antigua and Barbuda is a Caribbean nation in the Lesser Antilles island chain. The country is a second home for many of the pan-Caribbean genres of popular music, and has produced stars in calypso, soca, steeldrum, zouk and reggae. Of these, steeldrum and calypso are the most integral parts of modern Antiguan popular music; both styles are imported from the music of Trinidad and Tobago.

Little to no musical research has been undertaken on Antigua and Barbuda other than this. As a result, much knowledge on the topic derives from novels, essays and other secondary sources.

== History ==
Banjar
String instrument
- Classification: String instrument (plucked.)
- Hornbostel–Sachs classification: 321.32 (Composite chordophone)

Playing range
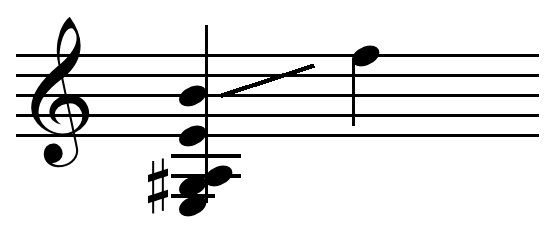
- (a standard tuned banjar)

Related instruments
- Bowed and plucked string instruments

Documented music in Antigua and Barbuda began only with the discovery of Antigua, then populated by Arawak and Caribs, by Christopher Columbus in 1493. The islands' early music, however, remains little studied. In the 1780s, documentation exists for African workers participating in outdoor dances accompanied by the banjar (later bangoe, perhaps related to the banjo) and toombah (later tum tum), a drum decorated with shell and tin jingles. By the 1840s, sophisticated subscription balls were common, held biweekly with European-derived quadrilles accompanied by fiddle, tambourine and triangle.

Colonial era churches and missionary activity displaced and otherwise influenced the music of the African slaves, who adopted elements of European-derived religious music. The brass bands of the Salvation Army are an important example. In the mid- to late 19th century, a number of Portuguese indentured workers came to Antigua, bringing with them their styles of music. When most of the Portuguese left in the 1880s, Lebanese music was brought to the island by immigrants from that country.

== Folk music ==
During the period of British and French colonial rule, African slaves were prohibited from celebrating in Carnival; they continued to do so, secretly, at home. There, an Afro-Caribbean style of percussion, dance and song called benna developed. Later, Antiguan and Barbudan folk music became more dominated by Trinidadian calypso and steelpan.

Most forms of modern Antiguan and Barbudan music are not indigenous to the islands, and were imported from France, the United Kingdom, United States, Jamaica and Trinidad. Colonial dance styles like the highland fling and the quadrille remain popular in Africanized form. The loss of Antiguan traditions can be ascribed to the lack of a French colonial past (French islands of the Lesser Antilles retain much African-derived music and dance), the influence of the powerful Codrington family, a relatively unified African ethnic identity, the lack of African immigration after the peak of slavery importation, the British military presence at Shirley Heights and a modern history of unstable economy and government.

=== Old Time Christmas Festival ===
The Old Time Christmas Festival was a culturally significant celebration, replaced in 1957 by a Trinidadian-inspired Carnival. The Antiguan Christmas Festival included several elements that have been adopted into the modern Carnival.

Christmas Festival traditions include both music and dance, especially related to masquerades and iron bands. The highland fling is a common Christmas Festival dance, also played in the modern Carnival, performed by people wearing Scottish kilts, masks made of wire and bearing whips of cowhide. Dancers wearing banana leaves and animal horns took part in the John Bull, while carolers paraded with long poles covered in lanterns, called carol trees, singing with accompaniment by the concertina. Stilt dancers in robes, called the Moko jumbie, Jumpa-Ben or Long Ghosts, were also common, and were accompanied by kettle and bass drums, fife, triangle (cling-a-ching) and the boompipe, made from a plumbing joint one meter long.

=== Benna ===
Benna (or bennah) is an uptempo Antiguan folk song that was introduced following the prohibition of slavery. Songs usually focused on scandalous and bawdy rumors and gossip, and were in a call-and-response form with a leader and an audience. Benna's popularity and similarity to calypso helped make the island receptive to that genre's introduction. The modern performer King Short Shirt has attempted to revive the benna in modern years, with his 1977 album Harambee an influential work that began updating benna with social and political awareness.

By the beginning of the 20th century, it had become a method of folk communication, disseminating news and reports from across the island. In the 1940s and 50s, an improvisational benna singer named John "Quarkoo" Thomas sang up-to-date stories on legal scandals, and the sexual affairs of the upper-class. He was eventually imprisoned because of the lyrics to "Cocoatea", which was about the daughter of a respected citizen, and her secret pregnancy while in a convent.

=== Popular music ===
In other popular genres of music Antigua is best known for oldest and most successful soca band the Burning Flames, who have claimed the road march title for many years, most recently 2005. Another well-known Antiguan musician was Patrick "Johnny" Gomes, who worked for, among many others, the calypso giant Mighty Swallow. The most famous indigenous musician in Antigua and Barbuda may be Oscar Mason, whose son O'Neill is also a noted trombonist. The Antigua Community Players have been active for more than 52 years, performing a variety of musical productions in many styles, including the Antiguan folk song, benna.

Jazz guitarist Roland Prince was from Antigua.

Basil Hill, owner of King Midas Records in New York, built a large international nightclub called the Atmosphere in 1978, creating a direct outlet for Antigua and Barbudan singers and bands.

Elements of non-Antiguan and Barbudan music have continued to be imported to the islands in the latter 20th century, including the electronic gospel music of the American Baptist church, and the Afro-Jamaican drumming of Rastafarian music.

Platinum-selling Antiguan-German singer-songwriter Au/Ra was also raised in Antigua, who has excelled in dance and pop music.

=== Carnival ===
See full article: Antigua Carnival

The Antiguan Carnival is a celebration of music and dance held annually from the end of July to the first Tuesday in August. The most important day is that of the j'ouvert (or juvé), in which brass and steel bands perform for much of the island's population. Barbuda's Carnival in June, and is known as Caribana. The Antiguan and Barbudan Carnivals replaced the Old Time Christmas Festival in 1957, with hopes of inspiring tourism in Antigua and Barbuda. Some elements of the Christmas Festival remain in the modern Carnival celebrations, which are otherwise largely based on the Trinidadian Carnival. The author Frank Manning has argued that this change, from indigenous traditions to tourist-oriented elements, has reduced Antiguans to "positions as service personnel and 'mimic men', robbing the culture of its natural integrity and cultural history".

=== Music festival ===
The Antigua and Barbuda international music festival, Romantic Rhythms, is a new addition to the summer line-up that peaks in August at the notorious Carnival celebrations. Geared to becoming a competing counterpart to the Carnival, the festival could eventually become the leading musical event in the entire Caribbean region. In its first year of establishment, the music festival already had some of the world's top artists perform.

=== Steelpan ===
The steelpan comes in many different forms, and put together is called a steel orchestra. Steel bands traditionally are made up of old pieces of metal such as old irons, tire rims, or steel pipes. Antigua's steel orchestras and iron bands can be found in churches and in many villages, and have been popular since their introduction. Every Carnival there is a competition to dub the best band of the island. Antigua's largest and oldest steel orchestra that still competes is Hell's Gate. It is said that the Brute Force Steel Band was the first steelpan band to record an album.

Steel orchestras have evolved to using highly technical instruments costing up to US$1500 for one instrument. These pans are meticulously honed out of the steel drum, sunken and burned over a hot fire, chromed and tuned. This process was perfected in Trinidad and Tobago and exported to Antigua and Barbuda through various collaborations between several of the bands in both island-nations.

=== Calypso ===
Calypso was sung throughout the English-speaking Caribbean, and was used by the poor as a platform for social and political commentary, using complex metaphors and folkloric references to obscure their meaning to outsiders. Later, beginning in the 1960s, a popularized kind of calypso was developed for use in tourist hotels. The first hotel calypsonians were Black Shirt, Skeetch and Dadian, who were accompanied by a string ensemble of two guitars and a bass guitar (created out of an oil drum). The Antigua Carnival, and the Antiguan Calypso King competition, began in 1957; the King that year was Styler. This era also saw a growth in patriotic calypsos, focused on an emerging sense of victorious nationalism in the wake of growing autonomy. By the middle of the 1960s, two rival calypsonians dominated the Antiguan scene, Zemaki and Lord Canary. Their conflict was perpetuated as the King Short Shirt and Swallow rivalry during the 1970s and 1980s. In the middle of the 1980s, the Burning Flames emerged, winning the road march with "Styley Tight" in 1985. They achieved pan-Caribbean acclaim.

It is clear that the genre of music now called calypso had strong roots in Trinidad and Tobago, but it would be inaccurate to suggest that this music started in any one island. Every island in the Caribbean has a form of music that resembles "kaiso", more commonly referred to as calypso. It is inaccurate to attribute the origin of calypso to any island. In Belize, they call their variation punta. In Antigua they call theirs benna.

Particularly in the English-speaking islands and Belize, African cultural roots have greatly influenced the beats and form of the music. All these musical forms borrow beats from West African highlife music and have fused North American pop and R&B with the Latin beats of central and South America and Cuba to form distinct musical genres which have significant variations in islands that were influenced by the French. Zouk and cadence are other popular variations.

== Soca ==
The defining staccato bass was the creation of the late Lord Shorty from Barrackpore, Trinidad and Tobago, and rose to fame as Lord Shorty with his 1963 hit "Clock and Dagger". He started out writing songs and performing in the calypso genre. In the 1970s, he began experimenting with calypso by blending it with the local chutney — the music of Trinidad's East Indian population — using instruments such as the sitar and tabla. The style was dubbed "soca".

== See also ==
- Romantic Rhythms Music Festival
- History of Antigua and Barbuda
