= Lisa Wickham =

Trinidad and Tobago television presenter

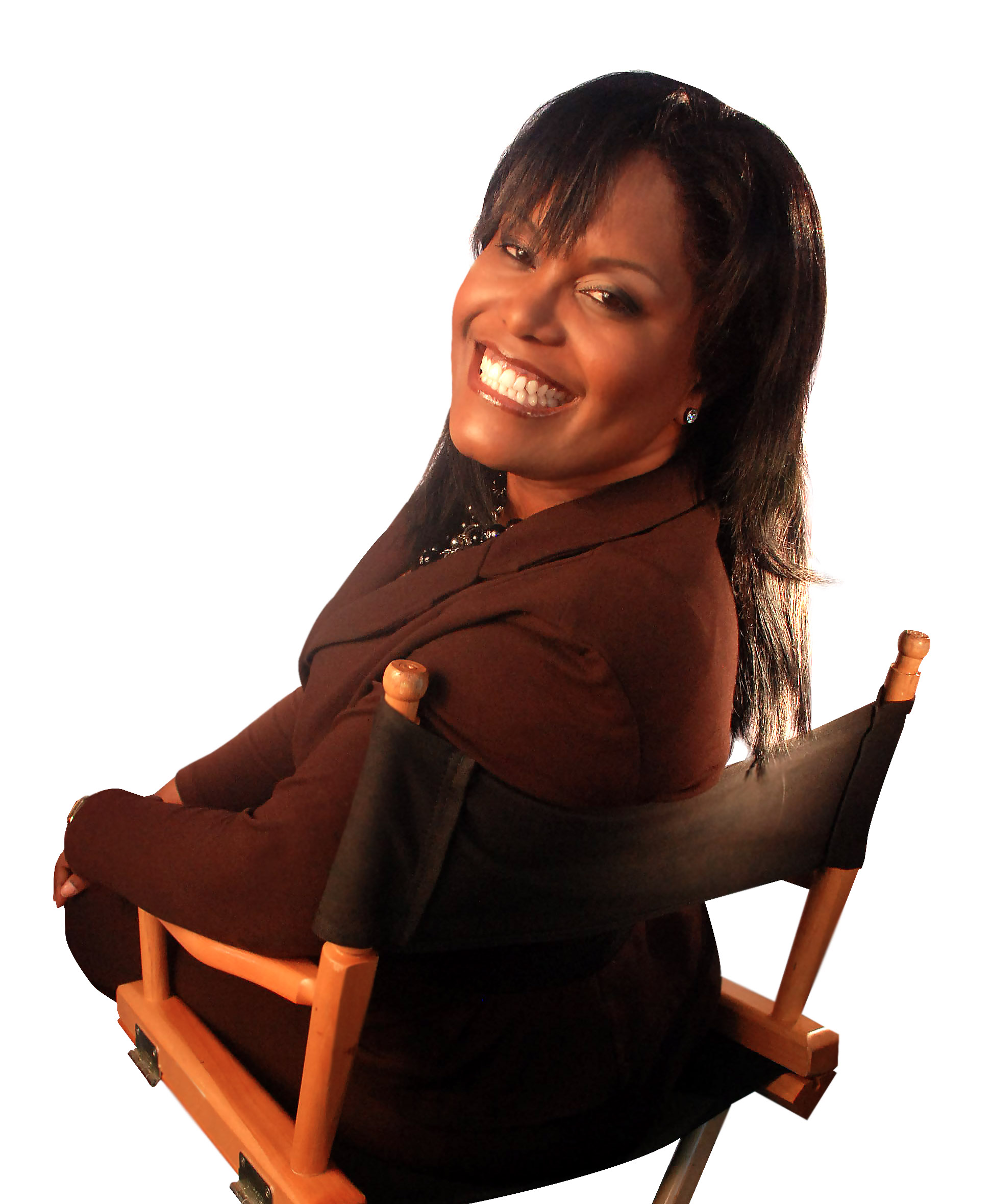
- Born: Lisa Wickham; Trinidad
- Occupations: Director & producer

Lisa Wickham is a media producer-director-TV personality in Trinidad and Tobago. She began her television career at the age of six on the weekly Rikki Tikki Children's Show, a live programme on the only national TV station in Trinidad and Tobago at the time, Trinidad and Tobago Television (TTT). She literally grew up on national television, eventually hosting shows such as the daily morning prime-time news and talk show T&T This Morning, the daily mid-morning talk show Community Dateline and the iconic teen talent show Party Time. In 2005, the government of Trinidad and Tobago closed TTT and in 2006 re-opened the station under the name Caribbean New Media Group (CNMG). CNMG was then closed in 2018.

Wickham is best known as a producer, line producer, location producer and Director for films, TV shows, advertisements and music videos including Home Again, Girlfriends Getaway, Hero: Inspired by The Life and Times of Mr. Ulric Cross, Forward Home: The Power of The Caribbean Diaspora, The E-Zone TV Series, Lisa Wickham's E-Zone, BET Turks and Caicos Jazz Show, BET St. Lucia Jazz Show, Chef Ainsley's Caribbean Kitchen, Tobago and Trinidad Episodes, Girls Cruise, Tobago and Trinidad Episodes, Love and Hip Hop Atlanta Season 8, Trinidad Episodes.

Wickham returned as the first face on the new TTT on September 3, 2018 as Creative Producer and Lead Host of the new morning talk show, The Now Morning Show. President and CEO of Imagine Media International Limited, she was invited to serve as the Interim CEO of TTT in 2019.

== Film and television ==
In 1999, Wickham was invited to co-host the mid-morning live talk show Dateline on Trinidad and Tobago Television (TTT), alongside Allyson Hennessy.

In 2002, she was offered the premier role as host of Trinidad and Tobago Television’s live prime-time morning talk show T&T This Morning, which she hosted and co-produced until the station closed in 2005. By this time Wickham had launched her own television production entity making the transition to producer-director, and producing Caribbean-syndicated shows such as The E-Zone and Bon Mange as well as music videos for some of the top soca and gospel artistes in the Caribbean, including Destra Garcia, Shurwayne Winchester, Claudette Peters, Rizon and Patrice Roberts. Wickham had also begun to make guest host appearances on the prime-time morning show of Barbados, Mornin' Barbados, on the national TV channel, Caribbean Broadcasting Corporation (CBC) (2002–05).

By 2006 The E-Zone TV Show (produced, directed and co-presented by Wickham) had been picked up by Omni 1, Canada, and BET J, in the US having already aired in 20 Caribbean territories. The E-Zone TV Show featured the people, places and faces of the West Indian diaspora and was the first TV Show of its kind to highlight carnivals in London, Miami, Canada, New York and most of the Caribbean Islands, St. Kitts Music Festival, Dominica's World Creole Music Festival, Antigua Sailing Week, St. Maarten Heineken Regatta, among others. It featured personalities including regional prime ministers, presidents, international recording stars and Caribbean artistes. Several spin-off shows in the Caribbean and the Diaspora have since emerged since The E-Zone.

In 2007 and 2008, Wickham produced and directed the Copyright Music Organisation of Trinidad and Tobago (COTT) Music Awards which was aired across the Caribbean.

By 2020, Wickham had produced and directed shows for Black Entertainment Television (BET and BET J), such as the St. Lucia Jazz Festival Post Show (2006 and 2007), the Turks and Caicos Music Festival (2006) and the 2007 Trinidad Carnival Special. In 2011, she produced, directed and executive produced Forward Home: The Power of the Caribbean Diaspora. Forward Home was filmed in Holland, Suriname, Canada, Guyana, Jamaica, the US, the UK, Barbados and Trinidad and Tobago. In 2011, she traveled to South Africa where she documented the introduction of Trinidad and Tobago styled Carnival to the Township of Bela Bela. In 2012, she was the line producer for the Sudz Sutherland and Jennifer Holness film Home Again. Don Carmody also served as producer on Home Again. In 2014, she produced the Bobbcat film directed by Roger Bobb, Girlfriends' Getaway. In 2015 she launched SOKAFIT, a health and fitness TV Show using the music of Trinidad and Tobago known as Soca music and combining it with dance moves. This TV show evolved into a full fledged health and fitness system. In 2015 she also joined the producing team of HERO: The Life and Times of Mr. Ulric Cross which eventually premiered to critical acclaim in 2018. HERO was filmed in Ghana, Canada, Trinidad and Tobago and The UK.

In 2020 HERO was the opening film in Hollywood at the 28th Pan African Film Festival. In 2018, Wickham became the creative producer and lead host of The NOW Morning Show on national television in Trinidad and Tobago on the station TTT.

== Career ==
Wickham attended the Warwick Business School, in the United Kingdom. She graduated with an MBA with Distinction. She attended the University of the West Indies where she graduated with a BSc Hons in Industrial Management. She also attended Wirschaft Universität, Vienna, Austria, Indian Institute of Management, Ahmedabad, India, Oxford University Said Business School and the London Film Academy. During and after her school years she has published in a number of business journals and newspapers and has conducted a number of motivational sessions and workshops throughout the Caribbean, for schools, organizations, government community projects and the Trinidad & Tobago Defence Force.

She was the general manager of the University of the West Indies, Institute of Business (IOB) now known as the Arthur Lok Jack School of Management. She served as the head of the Global Quality Exchange, a World Bank Project for Business Expansion and Industrial Restructuring for Trinidad & Tobago, CEO of Vision Marketing Caribbean Co. Ltd and interim CEO of TTT Media Network Limited. She is currently the president and CEO of Imagine Media International Limited.

Appearing on television since the age of six, she made the transition from children’s TV to adult contemporary TV, hosting a series of successful TV productions including a daily morning prime-time TV Show on national TV in Trinidad and Tobago and the popular E-Zone entertainment TV magazine show, which has been syndicated throughout the Caribbean and in the US on BET J. She has been a contributor to BBC Radio 5 Live and BBC Radio 1Xtra and has produced TV programmes for BET/BET J as well as the Government of Trinidad and Tobago.

In 2006 she founded E-Zone the Mag! magazine, which features articles on Caribbean entertainment personalities. E-Zone the Mag! and E-Zone TV Show have been used as teaching tools for the Caribbean Studies CAPE exam course in some high schools in Trinidad and Tobago and the Caribbean.

In 2007 and 2008, she was the artistic director and producer (for both stage and television) of the highly acclaimed annual COTT Music Awards, including the COTT Foundation Awards Dinner.

In 2009, Wickham was also producer-Trinidad for the UNICEF-MTV HIV/AIDS awareness film Tribes shot in Trinidad. In 2010, she was associate director for the Best of CaribbeanTales Film Festival, Symposium and Film Market in Barbados. Wickham is known for a number of award-winning films, TV shows, advertisements and music videos.

== Selected work as producer and/or director ==
Television shows

- 60 minute documentary 'Parliamentary Scrutiny & Oversight' - Government Trinidad and Tobago - 2015
- Trinidad and Tobago Local Government Debates 2013 – Live broadcast
- Tobago House of Assembly (THA) Government Debates 2013 – Live broadcast
- Dancing to the Rhythm of a Beat - TV feature filmed in South Africa 2012
- Trinidad and Tobago Local Government Debates 2010 – Live broadcast
- Ministry of Tourism: Tourism Today TV series 2010 – 2011 (Tour and Explore, Beautiful Beginnings Manzanilla, Destination Blanchisseuse, Destination Paramin, Pot Spoon Throw Down (Blanchisseuse & Sangre Grande), Visitor Safety Consultative Meeting, Brasso Seco)
- Lisa Wickham's The E-Zone – Season 8 2011
- Ministry of Tourism: Beach Watch – Safety on the Beach – series of TV ads – 2009 - 2011
- Parliament Channel, Government of Trinidad and Tobago: documentary feature on Parliamentary personalities – Bissoondath Ojah-Maharaj (2011), Gloria Henry (2012)
- Ministry of Tourism: Tourism - the Way Forward video feature 2010
- Ministry of Youth & Sport Affairs: 4-part youth series on Youth Violence & Crime 2008
- Ministry of Youth & Sport Affairs: TV feature – National Youth Parliament, 2008
- Business Development Corporation – (BDC) Corporate Feature and TV Spot Ad, 2008
- Digicel - "We Movin" Carnival ad feat. Destra & Kes 2008
- Common Cents – A financial programme by the Unit Trust Corporation
- Community Development Fund (CDF): Transforming Lives – The Duncan Street Boys
- BET/Ministry of Tourism: Trinidad Carnival Special 2007
- BET: Turks & Caicos Music Festival 2006
- BET: St. Lucia Jazz Festival 2006 & 2007
- Ministry of Community Development, Culture & Gender Affairs: 19-minute documentary Ending the Impunity for Violence Against Women & Girls, International Women's Day 2007
- Ministry of Community Development, Culture & Gender Affairs: Live production Gender on the Agenda series
- E-Zone Lifestyle & Entertainment: broadcast regionally, in Canada and on BET J in the USA
- Bon Mange Culinary Programme – broadcast regionally
- DESTRA Live on Location for UltimaxTV
- Live broadcast – several Carnival events on UltimaxTV Carnival 2K10

== Event producer ==
Public relations and media management

- 2014 – Red Carpet Gala Hollywood-styled premiere- Girlfriends Getaway, Trinidad
- 2013 – Red Carpet Gala Hollywood-styled premiere of Home Again at Movietowne, Trinidad, Movietowne, Tobago and British Museum, London
- 2013 – Celebrity Fun in the Sun – Carnival visit of Vivica A Fox, Damien Dante Wayans, Darrin Henson and Tatyana Ali
- 2012 – London Premiere of Forward Home: The Power of Caribbean Diaspora at the prestigious ICA (Institute of Contemporary Arts), The Mall, London
- 2010 – Public Relations/Event Launch Manager– Caribbean launch of the CaribbeanTales Worldwide Distribution Inc, Barbados
- Public Relations – International Launch of CaribbeanTales Worldwide Distribution Inc., Toronto
- 2008 – Event Manager/ Public Relations – T&T Red Carpet Premiere & School Screenings of the Film “A Winter Tale
- 2008 – Event Manager – 38th Annual Caribbean Shipping Association Conference, Exhibition & AGM – Gala Red Carpet Awards Dinner, Cultural Events Dinner and Spouse Programme
- 2008 & 2007 COTT Music Awards – Overall Event Manager and Producer/Artistic Director. Created the Concept of the COTT Music Awards Week of Activities commencing with the COTT Foundation Benefit Awards Dinner, the COTT Music Week of Performances and the COTT Music Awards Show including having Billy Ocean and Maxi Priest as surprise guests for the Finale.
- 2006 - Sir Richard Branson’s Carnival in T&T visit
- Warwick University, UK – International Office Caribbean Representative. In the first 5-year period, the University’s Caribbean market grew 200% in the first year and 700% in the 5th year.
- International Best Selling Author and Motivational Speaker Iyanla Vanzant Breakfast Seminar.
- Animae Caribe with Internationally Acclaimed Hollywood Actor/Director Robert Townsend.
- The Welcome Reception of Miss Universe® (1999). This event was specially hosted for the delegates and key sponsors on the first night in Trinidad. The Review: Excellent.

== Films and festivals ==
- 2017 – Producer – Hero Film (The Ulric Cross Story)
- 2014 – Producer – Pan! Mas! Africa! – Zimbabwe & South Africa (working title, In Production)
- 2014 – Producer – Girlfriends Getaway – Feature Film for Roger Bobb (President Bobbcat Films/Former Exec VP, Tyler Perry Studios) Released August 30, 2014
- 2013 – Distributor – Home Again (Trinidad & Tobago) [3 screens - 5 week run], Jamaica & UK
- 2013 – Line Producer – Pan! We Are The World - Docudrama (Director – Jerome Guiot)
- 2012 – Line Producer – Home Again – Feature Film - Producer, Don Carmody (Academy Award for Chicago)
- 2011 – Producer-Director – Dancing to the Rhythm of a Beat – shot in South Africa
- 2011 – Producer-Director – Forward Home: The Power of the Caribbean Diaspora – shot in Amsterdam, The Hague, Rotterdam, New York, Toronto, Jamaica, Barbados, Suriname, London, Guyana, Trinidad and Tobago.
- 2009 – Producer Trinidad – UNICEF/MTV TV film on HIV/AIDS Awareness ‘Tribes’
- 2002 – Public Relations & Sponsorship – Inaugural Anime Caribe Animation Festival

== Advertisements and corporate features (selected) ==
- Bisto (for McCann UK) Trinidad and Tobago leg (2015)
- Unit Trust Corporation – Testimonial series (2015)
- Digicel GROUP Usain Bolt Ad Series (2014)
- DIGICEL DVP Campaign Ad Series (2014) AAATT Award
- BMOBILE Start It – (Carnival 2014) ADDY Award Gold TV
- DIGICEL (Cindafella) (Carnival 2014)
- DIGICEL (Freebies) (2013) ADDY Award Gold TV
- SAGICOR Ad Series (With Canadian Untitled Films) (2013)
- National Carnival Commission T&T Carnival Promo Video (2013)
- NESTLE KLIM (2013)
- NESTLE UHT (2013)
- RBC Christmas (2012)
- Unit Trust Corporation – 30th Anniversary Testimonials (2012/2013) AAAT Award
- Blink-BMOBILE Olympic Shadows (2012) ADDY Award Gold TV
- BMOBILE – MOVE with Us – Carnival TVC (2011)
- BMOBILE – UNTOPPABLE Christmas TVC (2010)
- CaribbeanTales Incubator Video (2010)
- Digicel - “We Movin’ 2K8 Carnival Ad feat Destra & Kes
- Republic Bank Youth Link Video Feature & Windows to Republic Corporate (2010)
- Ministry of Tourism–Beach Watch – Safety on the Beach – series of TV Ads–2009-2011
- CARIB Drink What You Like – 2009
- Business Development Corporation – (BDC) Corporate Feature and TV Spot Ad, 2008
- Digicel - “We Movin’ 2K8 Carnival Ad feat Destra & Kes
- BMobile – World Cup 2006 “Fatman” Ad - Winner of Best of Class TV and TV Gold Awards at the Caribbean ADDY’s
- CNMG TV – ICC World Cup Cricket Promos
- Tortillaz (Music Video Style) Dancing Ad
- Ministry of Social Development (NADAAP) Carnival & Christmas TV Campaign
- Ministry of Tourism, ICC Cricket World Cup Essay Writing Competition TV Ad

== Music videos ==
- Destra – "Bacchanal" (Winner Soca Music Video Awards UK SocaNews Awards)
- Shurwayne Winchester & Cecile – "Rough Wine"
- Shurwayne Winchester "Dead or Alive"
- Shurwayne Winchester & Maxi Priest– "Make It Yours"
- Shurwayne Winchester – "Don’t Stop"
- Rizon – "Not Fuh Long/I Like Your Way"
- Rizon - "Reach"
- Shurwayne Winchester – "Open the Gate"
- Patrice Roberts – "Sugar Boy"
- WYP - "Position"
- 3 Suns – "Du Wop"
- Shurwayne Winchester – "Dead or Alive"
- David Reid – "Memories"

== Selected work as presenter ==
- Play Whe International Power Soca Monarch and Digicel International Groovy Soca Monarch Competitions (2013)
- Bmobile International Soca Monarch and Play Whe Groovy Soca Monarch, Celebrity Commentary Panel Host (2009)
- T&T This Morning - Trinidad and Tobago Television (2002–05)
- Live with Lisa Wickham - Trinidad and Tobago Television (2004 & 2004)
- Dateline - Trinidad and Tobago Television (1999–2000)
- Mornin Barbados - Caribbean Broadcasting Corporation, guest presenter (2002–05)
- Icons of TV mini-series - Trinidad and Tobago Television (2005)
- Gateway Jam, Carnival Special - Trinidad and Tobago Television (2003, 2004)
- Gayelle the Show, World Aids Day Special - Trinidad and Tobago Television (1988)
- Party Time - Trinidad and Tobago Television (1987–89)
- Rikki Tikki - Trinidad and Tobago Television (1973–85)

== E-Zone TV Show distribution ==
Country aired	TV station	Seasons
ANTIGUA	Antigua Broadcasting Service	1-6
USA	BET J	4&5
CANADA	OMNI 1	4&5
CARIBBEAN (CABLE)	CaribVision (20 territories)	1-6
BARBADOS	Caribbean Broadcasting Corporation	1-6
DOMINICA	Marpin Broadcasting]	1-6
GRENADA	Grenada Cable television - Community Channel 6	1-6
GUYANA	Guyana Television Broadcasting	1-6
JAMAICA	CVM Television Limited	1-6
NEVIS	GIS	1-6
ST. KITTS	ZIZ Broadcasting Television	1-6
ST. LUCIA	Daher Broadcasting Service	1-6
ST. MAARTEN & ST. IGNATIUS & SABA	Channel 15	1-6
ST. VINCENT	St. Vincent & The Grenadines Broadcasting Corporation (SVG TV)	1-6
TRINIDAD	TV6, Trinidad and Tobago Television, Synergy TV, NCC TV4, Gayelle TV	1-5, 1-6, 4, 1-6 and Germany Special respectively
TOBAGO	Channel 5	4-6
