= Graeme Hayward =

Canadian sailor

- Born: 1929
- Died: 4 July 2013 (aged 84); Oakville, Ontario Canada

Graeme Hayward (1929 – July 4, 2013) was a Canadian Fourteen Foot Dinghy Hall of Fame Inductee by the Canadian Dinghy Association at Royal Canadian Yacht Club Toronto 2011

- I-14 Team Race Champion (1x World and 6x Canadian)
- Canadian Dinghy Association and World Association President, CDA Champion
- America's Cup Match Racing rules pioneer, International Umpire and Judge
- 39 year CYA committee(s) member and chair

Over a 31-year period, Graeme owned and campaigned six International Fourteens, winning the World Team Races in Bermuda in 1959, the CDA Championship in 1958 and the CDA Team Racing Championships on six occasions. He helped build the clubhouse of the Itchenor Sailing Club and was Commodore of the Royal St. Lawrence Yacht Club in Montreal. Graeme was elected life member at Itchenor Sailing Club, Royal St. Lawrence Yacht Club and the Oxford-Cambridge Sailing Society. He was voted CYA Volunteer of the year in 1998.

As CDA president from 1966 to 1973, Graeme proposed and led the creation of the International Fourteen World Association. Graeme also served as CDA Measurer and Rules Committee Chairman for 25 years and helped author and update our constitution and class rules. As World President, he established formal trials for the single trapeze in North America and successfully lobbied the UK association to ensure its worldwide adoption in 1971. He was a leader of the Fourteen fleet in Montreal winning many important Canadian and US trophies including the Bongard, Buzzards Bay Bowl, DP Kirby Memorial and seven RstLYC I-14 class championships.

After Fourteens, Graeme helped introduce on-the-water umpiring to the match racing world. He was the rules advisor for the Canadian entries at the 1982 and 1986 America's Cups and was part of the International Jury/Umpire teams in Fremantle, San Diego and Auckland. He was a member of the ISAF Working Party in Lymington that established the rules for umpiring and match racing (now Appendix C). He served as an International Umpire for 15 years, helped develop the Umpires’ call book and co-authored and administered the ISAF Umpires’ test. He has been an ISAF umpire and judge at 26 World Match Racing Conference events including various Louis Vuitton Cups, Nations Cups and Gold Cups. He has chaired or umpired at a further 27 match racing events including fourteen York Cups and the 2007 International C-Class Championships.

Graeme has also served as ISAF judge over a 30-year period at 34 world and 57 major championships ranging from the International Fourteen Worlds to the Canada's Cup, Maxi World Cup, Whitbread, Australian America's Cup Defender Trials, SORC, Miami OCR, and World Championships for the Farr 40, J24 and Laser classes. Back home, Graeme was a member and chairman of the CYA Appeals, Racing Rules and Umpires’ committees over a 39-year period. In recognition of his contributions, he was elected member emeritus of the Appeals committee in 2004 and named CYA Judge emeritus in 2011.

… as an official you are the stewards of the game of sailing. We should not inject ourselves into the sport but keep the playing field even for all competitors.

— Graeme Hayward, 1995 – A quote from one of his many Umpire Seminars

== Biography ==
=== Death and afterward ===
Graeme died on Thursday, July 4, 2013, following a five-year battle with cancer and other complications. He was 85. Graeme is survived by his caring and beloved wife Janice, his sons Gavin (Megan and daughter Lexie) and Peter (Andrea).

== Additional background ==
=== Yacht clubs ===
Since 1950 Itchenor Sailing Club Honorary life member

Since 1952 Oxford and Cambridge Sailing Society Life member

Since 1956 Royal St. Lawrence Yacht Club Commodore 1982–83, Honorary life member ‘10

1987-2008 Oakville Club

== Fourteens Owned ==
1950 Thor K 501 Uffa Fox 1969 Tradewind KC 354 Kirby III

1957 Stormalong KC 179 Fairey V 1971 Bacchante KC 391 Kirby IV

1964 Spindrift KC 279 Kirby II 1975 Goldfinger KC 476 Kirby V

== Competitive Sailing Background ==
Competed in Fireflies, International Fourteens, Swordfish, Merlin-Rockets, International 30 sq. m., Swallows, Dragons, International 5.5 m and Offshore racing events. Principal class of competition was the International Fourteen. Owned and actively campaigned a series of six I-14s over 31 years from 1949 until 1980. Finished 6th at POW in 1951. Won the Itchenor Gallon in 1952, the CDA Championships and the Governor General's Trophy in 1958 (in a fleet of over 50 boats), the Buzzards Bay Bowl in 1960, the Bongard Cup, the DP Kirby Memorial, seven RstLYC I-14 Class Championships and three RstLYC Club Championships. Team raced from 1948 until 1980. Member Cambridge University sailing team 1949. Twice member of the winning team for the Wilson Trophy at West Kirby. Member of the winning team at the

International 14 World Team Races in Bermuda 1959. Twice member of Canadian International 14 teams at other World Team Races in 1969 (Kingston) and 1971 (Annapolis). Member of the winning team at 6 Currie Cups (Canadian I-14 Team Racing Championships). Since 1980 have cruised extensively in the Great Lakes and the Caribbean.

== International Fourteen Associations ==
1954-1956 Member, UK International 14 committee.

1956-1980 Member, Canadian International 14 Dinghy Association.

1956 to 1980 Official Class measurer

1957 to 1980 Rules committee chairman

1966 to 1973 Canadian Dinghy Association President

1970-1972 President, World Association of International 14 ft dinghies

== Canadian Yachting Association ==
Since 1970 Member, Appeals Committee - Chairman 1980–2003, Member emeritus 2004

Since 1970 Member, Racing Rules Committee - Chairman1994-2007

1987-2006 Chief Umpire and Chairman Umpires’ committee

1995 Author of the book ‘The Complete Match Racing’ Two editions were published relating to the 1993/96 rules CYA Volunteer of the Year

2011 CYA Judge emeritus

== International Sailing Federation/International Yacht Racing Union ==
1980-2010 International Judge

1991-2006 International Umpire

1989 Member of the Working Party in Lymington which established Appendix B6 for match racing (now Appendix C). Part author of the first IU test.

1995 Member of the Working Party for up-dating the ISAF International Judges manual.

1997-2000 Member of the Working Party for the International Umpires’ Callbook.

1997-2000 Member of the Working Party and editor of the International Umpires’ tests.

1999-2000 Member, Racing Rules Committee.

Participation in Louis Vuitton series to the America's Cup Regattas

1982 Newport. Rules advisor to Canada 1

1986 Fremantle. Rules advisor to Canada 2.

1996-1997 Fremantle. Member of the International Jury for the Australian America's Cup Defender trials.

1992 San Diego. Umpire and member of the International Jury for RR-1, RR-2 and the Finals of the Louis Vuitton Cup.

1996 San Diego. Worked with the Woman's Challenge for the America's Cup for two weeks as a guest umpire in their tune-up trials.

1999/2000 Auckland. Umpire and member of the International Jury for the Round Robins and Semi-final of the Louis Vuitton Cup.

== Member of International Juries at the following Principal Events ==
=== World Championships ===
International America's Cup Class Worlds 1995

Maxi Worlds 1987 and 1989

12m Worlds 1988

International 50 ft Worlds 1993

8m Worlds 1989

5.5m Worlds 1989

One Ton Worlds 1988

Corel 45 Worlds 1997

Farr 40 Worlds 1998, 2000, 2002 and 2004

Mumm 36 Worlds 1998, 2003 and 2004

J 24 Worlds 1982, 1992 and 2000

E 22 Worlds 1981 and 1982

Hobie 18 Worlds 1987

International 14 Worlds Team Racing 1978, 1985 and 2002

International 14 Worlds 2002

Australian 14 Worlds 1986

5 O5 Worlds 1990

Laser Worlds 1980

420 Worlds 1997

Disabled Sailing Worlds 1993

Melges 24 Worlds 2002

Mumm 30 Worlds 2000, 2002 and 2004

Sunfish Worlds 2002

Number of events 34

=== Other major events ===
Canada's Cup 1978, 1988, 1994, 2001 and 2003

Whitbread Round the World (at Ft Lauderdale) 1994

Australian America's Cup Defender Trials 1986 and 1997

5.5m Scandinavian Gold Cup 1989 and 1997

Key West Week 1996-1998 and 2001-2003

Southern Ocean Racing Conference Week 1996 through 2004

Block Island Week 1995, 1997, 1999, 2001, 2003, 2005, 2007

Antigua Sailing Week 1998 through 2006

Bermuda Race Week 1996 and 1997

Bayview – Mackinac Race 1993, 1998 and 1999

British America's Cup (Team Racing) 1996

Miami Olympic Classes Regatta 1995

Soling North Americans 1998

49er North Americans 1998

J 24 North Americans 1991

J 24 Mid-winters 1997

Farr 40 Bahamian Championship 2002

Farr 40 Invitational 2003

Miami Race week 2005, 2006

Star Western Hemisphere 2005

J 35 North Americans 2007

Number of events 57

== Umpired at the following Principal Events ==
=== World Match Racing Conference events ===
WMRC Match Race Finals 1991 and 1992.

Louis Vuitton Cup, RR-1, RR-2 and Finals 1992

Bermuda Gold Cup 1991 through 1996, 1998 and 1999

Columbus Cup 1992

IYRU Nations Cup, Grand Final 1995

12m Worlds 1988

Maxi Worlds 1987 and 1988

Infanta Donna Christina (Soling Worlds) 1995

Congressional Cup 1989 and 1996

Golden Gate Invitational 1994, 1996, 1998 and 1999

Knickerbocker Cup 1995, 1996 and 2000

Nippon Cup 1992

Virgin Islands Match Race 1998

Santa Maria, US Women's Championship 1999-2002 and 2006

Thompson Cup, Women's MR Championship 2000 and 2006

UBS Challenge, Championship Finals 2002

Number of events 26

=== Other Match Racing events ===
Nations Cup, Area E Eliminations 1991 and 1995

Canadian Match Race Championships 1991 through 1994

York Cup, RCYC, Toronto 1989 through 2002

Soling North Americans 1998

UBS Challenge, US Championship 2002

C Class Catamaran, Championship 2007

Number of events 27

Note: At most of these match racing events, was also a member of the International Jury.
