= Romantic Rhythms Music Festival =

- Festival Logo
- Genre: Love songs R&B; Soca
- Locations: Antigua and Barbuda, Sir Vivian Richards Cricket Grounds (2008)
- Website: Romantic Rhythms website

Romantic Rhythms Music Festival is a music festival that is set to take place in Antigua and Barbuda every year during the slow tourism season of May/June. The inaugural festival took place from the 13 to 16 June 2008. Headliners then included Keyshia Cole, Shaggy, Lionel Richie, Kenny Rogers, Musiq Soulchild, Damian Marley, Destra Garcia, Brian McKnight and Maxi Priest. The first festival took place at the Sir Vivian Richards Cricket Grounds built for 2007 Cricket World Cup.

== Origins ==
Antigua and Barbuda, award winning destination for Weddings and Honeymoons, will burst onto the entertainment scene as the epitome of romance, when The Romantic Rhythms Festival is launched during the month of June 2008. Music aficionados will fall in love as the lyrical beauty engulfs the entire destination, spreading peace, love and unity to locals and visitors alike. - According to the festival promo.

The Music Festival was the brainchild of the Antigua Minister of Tourism, Harold Lovell, his team and the chairman of the festival board, Dr. Alvin Edwards. The festival was to be a "shot in the arm" for the tourism slump around the months of May and June. It was meant to keep a steady flow of visitors into Antigua between Antigua Sailing Week in April and Antigua Carnival in July/August.

The original festival cost a reported US$2 Million to host.

== Location ==
Full article: Sir Vivian Richards Cricket Grounds

Sir Vivian Richards Stadium is a multi-use, world class ultra-modern stadium in North Sound, Antigua and Barbuda, named after Viv Richards. It was built for use in the 2007 Cricket World Cup where it hosted Super 8 matches. It holds 10,000 people normally, but temporary seating doubled its capacity for the ICC Cricket World Cup 2007. Its construction was financed by China.

The stadium is strategically built on a site approximately 10–20 minutes drive from the capital city St. John's and the country's international airport (VC Bird International Airport). The venue cost an estimated US$60 million to build, with the majority of the funds comes from the Chinese Government grant.

== Past Performers ==
- Brian McKnight
- Damian Marley
- Destra Garcia
- Heather Headley
- Kenny Rogers
- Keyshia Cole
- Lionel Richie
- Maxi Priest
- Musiq Soulchild
- Shaggy
- Shermain Jeremy
