= El-A-Kru =

El-A-Kru is an Antiguan soca band. The name derives from "Little Antigua Crew".

The band's single, 'Antigua Nice' (from their 2006 album of the same name) has been dubbed "Antigua’s new anthem", and was used extensively by the Antigua Ministry of Tourism in their customer care initiative for the 2007 Cricket World Cup. 'Expose', another single from the Antigua Nice album, topped MTV Tempo's Cross Caribbean Countdown for several weeks in 2007. Two tracks from El-A-Kru's 2007 album Fully Loaded, 'Kick It Off' and 'Fully Loaded', featured in DJ Alex Jordan's 2007 Christmas program in her International Sounds of Soca series for BBC 1Xtra. The band was also nominated for the Overall Soca Band of the Year at the 2007 International Soca Awards.

El-A-Kru are frequent performers at the Antigua Carnival, where they have won the title of "Sweetest Band on the Road" four times of the last eight years, winning the title for a record three years in a row. In 2007, they toured the UK with the Antigua Carnival Roadshow, marking the 50th anniversary of the Carnival. The band also perform at the Trinidad and Tobago Carnival and the Saint Kitts and Nevis and Miami Carnivals and have appeared in The Caribbean Splashdown Music Festival in New York City. In June 2008, they are scheduled to appear in the Antigua and Barbuda International Music Festival.

== Background ==
The band was formed in 1990 as L.A. Crew. For their first seven years they performed mostly on the hotel and tourist circuits, and had several local hit recordings. In 1998, they recruited their lead singer, Tanzania "Tizzy" Sebastian, who has performed with the band ever since. They also changed their name to El-A-Kru. In 1999, "Tizzy" and El-A-Kru made a breakthrough at the Trinidad and Tobago Carnival with their first hit single outside Antigua, 'Lethal Batty', performing in 19 shows over 28 days.

== Current band members ==
- Tanzania "Tizzy" Sebastian, lead vocalist. "Tizzy" was named Female Soca Performer of the Year and Best New Female Soca Artist at the 2007 International Soca Awards. Before joining El-A-Kru, she was primarily known as a dancer and was one of the original members of The Antigua Dance Academy.
- Rohan “Sylky” Hector, keyboards. He is the original founder of El-A-Kru and is also the band's producer, arranger, and musical director.
- Glenroy “Zamba” Richards, vocalist and guitarist. He is also the primary songwriter of the group.

== Former band members ==
- "Naycha Kid" (Junior Afori Edwards), winner of ABGMA Best Soca Gospel for the year 2015 – now a solo vocalist.
- Glenroy "Byke" Joseph – became the lead vocalist for Da Bhann.
- Lincoln "Blade" Stanislaus Jr., second vocalist. In 1999 he was the winner of the Antigua song festival and went on to represent Antigua at the Caribbean Song Festival final in Cuba. He is now with the Burning Flames.

== Discography ==
- Lethal Batty (1998)
- Destination 2000 (1999)
- 911 Emergency (2000)
- Social Ah Gwaan (2001)
- Soca Paramedics (2002)
- Raw Soul (2003)
- The One (2004)
- Changes (2005)
- Antigua Nice (2006)
- Fully Loaded (2007)
- Rocket Launcher (2008)
- De Road Show (2009)
- Soca Animals (2010)
