= Benna (genre) =

Music genre

Benna (alternatively spelled bennah, or called ditti) is a genre of Antiguan and Barbudan music.

Benna is a calypso-like genre, characterized by scandalous gossip and a call-and-response format. It first appeared during slavery, and became a form of folk communication in the early 20th century, and it spread local news across the islands. John Quarkoo was a singer who used the genre to criticize oppressors of black people. It was the main genre of non-religious music in the region until the 1950s, after which was replaced by the popularity of Trinidad calypso.

Singing Benna is referenced three times in the short story Girl by Jamaica Kincaid published in the New Yorker Magazine June 19, 1978.
