= Community Dateline =

Community Dateline is a television show in Trinidad and Tobago, one of the most popular programmes of its era. It ran for many years on Trinidad and Tobago Television Channel 2 and 13 at 11.00 am-12 noon on weekdays until Trinidad and Tobago Television was closed on January 15, 2005. The hosts were Allyson Hennessy together with Judy Alcantara, Majorie, Lisa Wickham and Wilbert Holder. It was a talk show and it had many segments discussing many things like carnival, youth, disabilities and other topics. Its replacement was the weekday 10.00am-12 noon with Allyson on the National Carnival Commission channel 4 unlike the former it is two hours long and there is only one host, Allyson Hennessy. Sometimes some segments are being replayed as well.
