= Allyson Hennessy =

Trinidad and Tobago television news presenter

- Born: January 4, 1948
- Died: May 7, 2011 (aged 63); Port-of-Spain
- Occupations: Television news presenter, talk show host, chef
- Spouse: Emmett Hennessy

Allyson Hennessy (4 January 1948 – 7 May 2011) was a veteran Trinidad and Tobago television news presenter. She was trained in the United Kingdom.

== Media career ==
Hennessy entered at Trinidad and Tobago Television and hosted the program Community Dateline for several years with other presenters including Terrance Greaves, Wendell Constantine, Judy Alcantara, Lisa Wickham (1999–2000) and Judy Chong Dennison until 2005 when the station closed. In 2009 she was received the "Media Excellence" award from the Trinidad & Tobago Publishers and Broadcasters Association.

In 2010, she began co-hosting The Box, a daily TV talk show on the Gayelle network, with a talk show format styled after the U.S. morning program The View. She also had her own television program, Allyson 10-12. Hennessy was a familiar face as host of carnival activities and special events.

== Veni Mangé ==
A Cordon Bleu-trained chef, Hennessy was a co-owner of the Veni Mangé Restaurant.

== Personal life ==
She was married to Emmett Hennessy, a fellow journalist; they had no children.

== Death ==
Hennessy fell ill in late April 2011, with an undisclosed illness, and was hospitalised in the intensive care unit at the St. Clair Medical Centre in Port-of-Spain. She never recovered and died at St. Clair Medical on 7 May 2011, aged 63.
