= Superyacht Cup =

Annual yachting race in Antigua

The Superyacht Cup is a yachting race for large sailing yachts that takes place at Nelson's Dockyard in the island of Antigua, Caribbean, every year. It was first organized in 2006 by the Superyacht Cup team from Palma, Mallorca.
