= Shermain Jeremy =

Antiguan model

Shermain
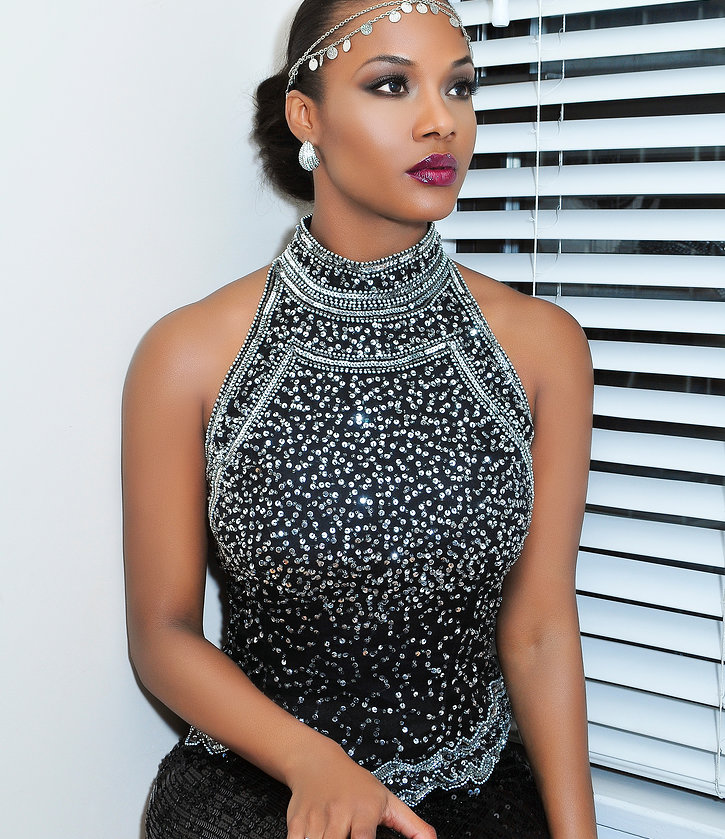
- Shermain Jeremy

Background information
- Birth name: Shermain Sunja Jeremy
- Born: 24 June 1983 (age 41)
- Origin: Antigua and Barbuda
- Genres: Reggae pop
- Occupation(s): Singer, beauty queen
- Years active: 2003–present
- Labels: Tropic Gem Records
- Website: shermain.com

Shermain Sunja Jeremy (born 24 June 1983) is an Antiguan singer and beauty pageant titleholder, winner of the Miss Antigua and Barbuda Carnival Queen Show competition in 2002 and Jaycee's Caribbean queen show that year. In the Miss World 2004 pageant, she won the Miss World Talent competition.

== See also ==
- Vybz Kartel
- Antigua Carnival
