= Antigua Carnival =

Celebration in Antigua

- Antigua Carnival logo
- Observed by: Antigua (Antigua and Barbuda)
- Type: Cultural
- Significance: celebration of emancipation
- Celebrations: processions, music, dancing, and the use of masquerade
- Date: late July through early August
- Duration: 13 days
- Frequency: Annual
- First time: 1957
- Related to: Caribbean Carnival, Carnival, Christmas, Emancipation, Calypso, Soca, Pan music, Zouk

The Antiguan Carnival is a celebration of emancipation from slavery, held annually on the island of Antigua. It is a thirteen-day festival of colorful costumes, beauty pageants, talent shows, and music. The festival begins in late July and ends the first Tuesday in August, known as Carnival Tuesday. Both Carnival Monday and Carnival Tuesday are public holidays on the island. Antiguan Carnival replaced the Old Time Christmas Festival in 1957, with hopes of inspiring tourism in Antigua and Barbuda. Some elements of the Old Time Christmas Festival remain in the modern Carnival celebrations.

One of the biggest events of Antiguan Carnival is that of the j'ouvert (or juvé), in which brass and steel bands perform for much of the island's population, starting early in the morning. Other major events of Antiguan Carnival include the Party Monarch and Calypso Monarch competitions of Calypsonians, the Panorama steel band competition, the Parade of Bands, the Miss Antigua Pageant, and the Caribbean Queen's Competition. The festival also includes numerous smaller festivities, such as local concerts, food fairs, parades, and cultural shows.

== History of Carnival ==
=== Emancipation ===
The history of Antigua's Carnival begins in the 1800s with the abolition of slavery. On August 1, 1834, enslaved Africans were emancipated in Antigua and other British colonies, per the Slavery Abolition Act 1833. On that day, Antiguans took to the streets to celebrate their freedom and express their joy. Antigua was the only British colony in the Caribbean where the enslaved population was freed unconditionally, as opposed to via indentured servitude. Over the years there was a return to this informal celebration of emancipation. Antiguans celebrated August 1 with picnics, family reunions, and other small celebrations. Today's Carnival is a formal, island-wide celebration of emancipation.

=== Christmas Festival ===
In the early-to-mid 1900s, before Carnival, Antigua's Old Time Christmas Festival was a popular and culturally significant annual festival. Traditions of the festival included both music and dance, especially related to masquerades and iron bands. Many other elements of the Old Time Christmas Festival are still seen in the modern Carnival today. For instance, the "highland fling" was a common Christmas Festival dance performed by people wearing Scottish kilts, masks made of wire and bearing whips of cowhide. Dancers wearing banana leaves and animal horns took part in the "John Bull," while carolers paraded with long poles covered in lanterns (called "carol trees") singing with accompaniment by the concertina. Stilt dancers in robes, called the Moko Jumbie, Jumpa-Ben or Long Ghosts, were also common, and were accompanied by kettle and bass drums, fife, triangle (cling-a-ching) and the boompipe, made from a plumbing joint one meter long. The Old Time Christmas Festival took place annually until 1957, when it was replaced by the modern-day Carnival.

=== 1950s and inaugural Carnival ===
On June 3, 1953, a single-day carnival was organized as part of Queen Elizabeth II's coronation celebration. Thousands of Antiguans celebrated with a parade, floats, and a children's carnival. Due to the success of the festival, Antiguans lobbied having an annual summertime festival. Three years later, John Ferdie Shoul (chairman of the carnival) and Maurice Ambrose (builder and musician) worked together to create a plan for a Carnival that celebrated emancipation and served as a tourist attraction.

On August 1, 1957, Antigua celebrated its first official Carnival. Mr. Shoul secured Carnival Monday as a public holiday. The festival included a parade with floats sponsored by local businesses. The inaugural Carnival Queen show was held at the Deluxe Cinema, and Miss Gloria White was crowned Antigua's first Carnival queen. A Calypso competition was also held at the Deluxe Cinema, and the winner was Mighty Styler.

After the inaugural 1957 Carnival, the Carnival Committee was started by Hon Edmund Lake (Minister of Social Services). John Ferdinand Shoul was elected as the first Carnival Committee Chairman.

=== Musical origins ===
There are several different musical forms featured during Carnival. Calypso, the oldest, has its roots in slavery; a common explanation of its origins is that it began as a way for slaves, who were forbidden to speak in the fields, to communicate with each other. It is a polyglot, improvisational form that depends largely upon the skill of a soloist, (the calypsonian) who weaves the sounds of many cultures into a lyrical whole. Calypso competitions have long been a highlight of Carnival. Steel drum music was created when the bamboo percussion instruments traditionally used to back up calypso were replaced by hammered steel pans cut from oil drums. Whereas there is no dispute that the steel pan was developed in Trinidad, the indigenous development of the steel band in Antigua and Barbuda was an outgrowth of the iron bands which were prominent at Christmas time. Steel drum music has been an important part of Carnival since that time, and Antigua is home to many of the Caribbean's finest steel bands. Soca is a musical form that grafts the slower beat of American soul music to the upbeat tempos of calypso. Soca began in the 1970s, and by the middle of the 1980s it had become an integral feature of Carnival.

== Parades and mas' ==
Antigua's carnival has multiple parades and costumed events called mas', short for masquerade. Historically, mas' in the Caribbean involved paraders dressed up in big, elaborate costumes depicting real-life figures of the past in order to tell stories of the past. Today there are many different types of mas' during the Carnival of Antigua and other Caribbean islands. Participating in the costumed parades is known as "playing mas'."

=== Opening Parade and Ceremony ===
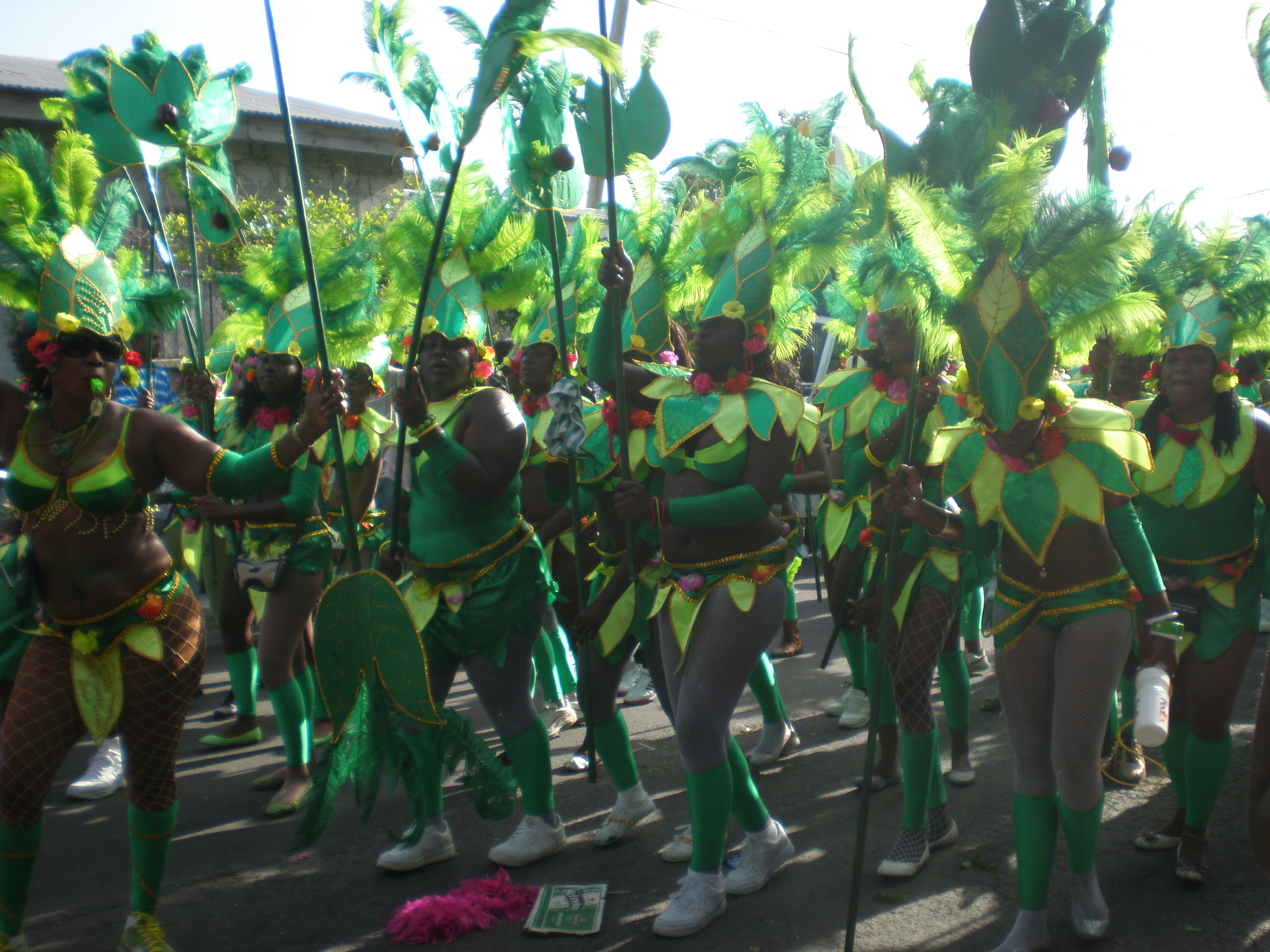
Carnival Patrons on parade in Antigua

Antigua's carnival officially kicks off with an Opening Parade through the city of St. John's. Bands and troupes come out in T-shirts bearing the insignia of their respective companies. Parade floats, which were popular in the past, have begun to see a resurgence in their popularity. The participants of carnival competitions also appear in the parade. The Opening Parade usually begins near Parliament Drive or Independence Avenue, and always concludes at "Carnival City" (the official title given to the Antigua Recreation Ground, or ARG, during the carnival season).

Following the parade the Opening Ceremony takes place in Carnival City. During the ceremony, Carnival is declared as officially beginning. Contestants for the various carnival competitions make a final public appearance before their shows. The ceremony usually finishes with fireworks.

=== Children's Carnival ===
While much of Antigua's Carnival is suited for adults only, an entire day has been designated for youths: the Children's Carnival, or Junior Carnival. The Children's Carnival Parade (or Junior Carnival Parade) let's children participate in a carnival parade in a family-friendly environment. Children in the parade wear costumes portraying different themes taken from fairy tales, etc. Cheerleading has also become a part of the Junior Carnival Parade. The children march through the streets and finish the parade at Carnival City.

=== J'ouvert ===
J'ouvert is a Caribbean carnival celebration of ancestors as well as liberation, a popular part of many Caribbean carnivals. On Antigua, J'ouvert is a celebration of freedom from slavery on the island.

The term j'ouvert comes from a French creole word jour ouvert, meaning "daybreak". Patrons gather around 3:00 or 4:00 AM on Carnival Monday and meet in St. John's. There, they find their favorite bands ("jam bands") and follow them marching and dancing (i.e. "jam" with them) along the route. There is drinking, painting of bodies with paint, mud, and pitch oil, and people wearing colourful costumes. The event usually concludes around 10:00 AM.

=== Carnival Monday and Tuesday ===
Antigua's Carnival festivities conclude on the first Monday and Tuesday in August, dubbed Carnival Monday and Tuesday. Both Carnival Monday and Carnival Tuesday are official holidays.

After J'ouvert on Monday morning, revelers come back into St. Johns in the afternoon for the Carnival Monday parade, where they enjoy music and costumed parading. Competitions also take place on Carnival Monday. On Tuesday, all of the troupes, bands, and floats all come together in St. John's for a final parade. The parade culminates at Carnival City. During Carnival Monday and Tuesday, there takes place the judging of troupes and groups takes place. Troupes are awarded prizes and the Road March king is decided upon.

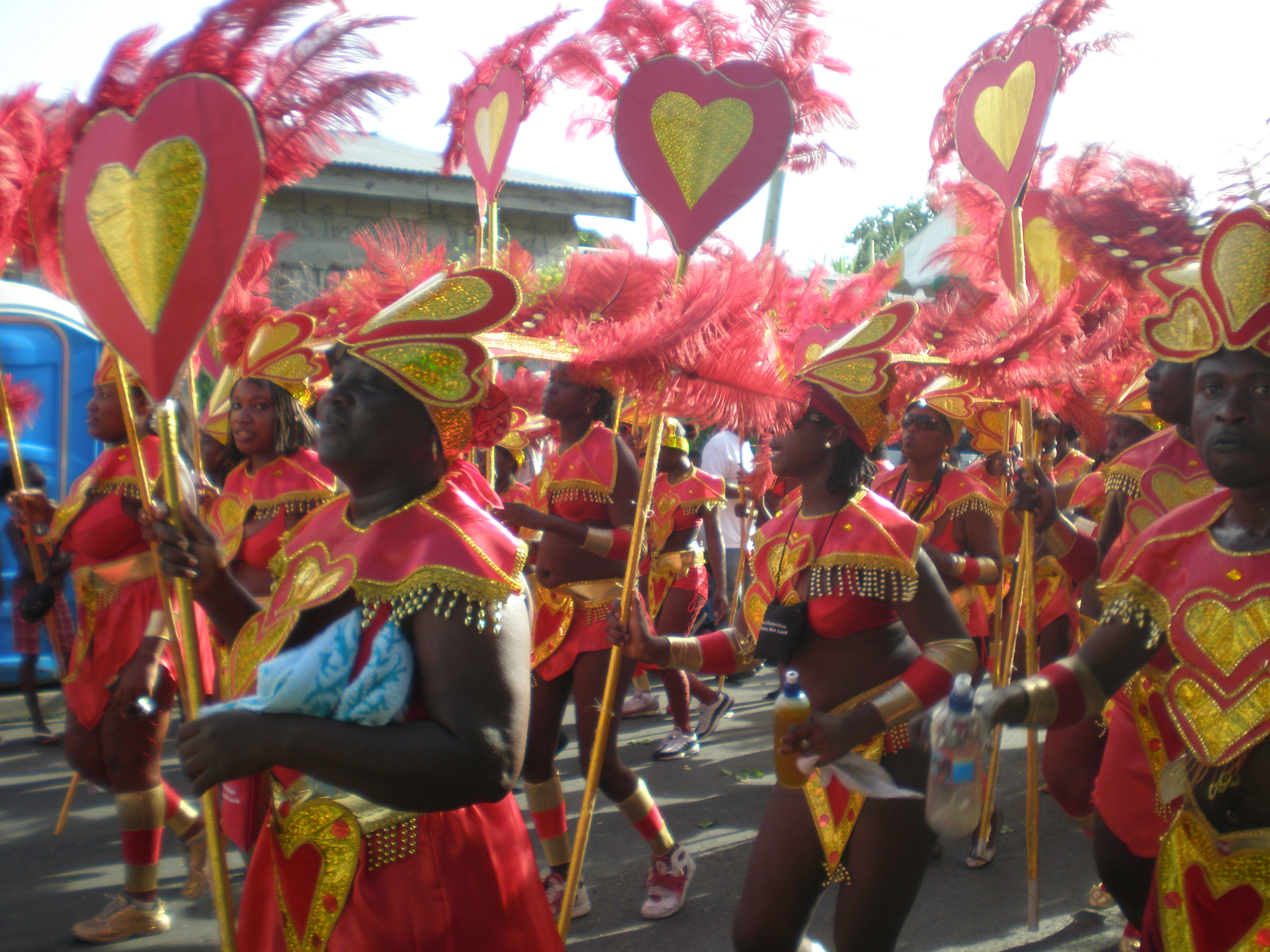
Revellers on Carnival Tuesday.

List of Antiguan Mas' Troupes and Groups:

- Vitus
- Dynamics
- Revellers
- Myst
- Showcase
- Exotic
- Passion
- Solid Mas
- Wadadli Madness
- Ali and Associates
- Extreme Mas
- Fantasy 268
- Ali and Associates
- Insane

== Pageants ==
=== Mr & Miss Teenage Pageant ===
The Mr & Miss Teenage Pageant (formerly the Teenage Pageant, Teen Splash, and Teen Explosion) is a highly anticipated show during carnival. Teens from different secondary schools around Antigua (specifically performing arts students) compete against each other. The teens compete against each other in the following judged segments: Best Interview, Uniform Evolution, Cultural Personality, Best Introduction Speech, and Best performing Talent.

One Mr Teenage and one Miss Teenage are crowned, although in the past, the competition has alternated between having two verses one winner. Additionally, the following awards are given: Most Helpful, Most Congenial, Most Photogenic, and Best Promotional Video.

=== Queen of Carnival ===
The Queen of Carnival pageant, or "Queen Show", is one of two competitions that took place at the inaugural Antigua Carnival in 1957.[https://antiguacarnival.com/about/history] Today, it is the most prestigious and coveted pageant title in Antigua and Barbuda. Women from all over the island take part in the competition that has propelled many into the public eye. Contestants compete in the following judged segments: Interview, Swimwear, Talent, Carnival Costume, and Evening Wear. One Queen of Carnival is crowned. A first runner-up and a second runner-up are named. Additionally, the following awards are given: Miss Congenial, Most Photogenic, and Leadership.

Many additional opportunities can open for the winner, as the pageant is a platform to select a representative for other pageants, such as the Jaycees Caribbean Queen Show.

=== Jaycees Caribbean Queen Show ===
The Jaycees Caribbean Queen show has taken place since the 1970s. Competitors from across the Caribbean region compete for the title of Jaycees Caribbean Queen. Contestants from islands such as Anguilla, Antigua and Barbuda, Barbados, British Virgin Islands, Dominica, Guyana, Jamaica, Nevis, St. Kitts, St. Lucia, St. Vincent, St. Croix, and Trinidad and Tobago enter every year. Antigua's representative in the competition is always the winner of Antigua's Queen of Carnival pageant just days before.

Contestants compete in the following judged segments: Interview, Swimwear, Talent, Modeling, and Evening Wear. One Jaycees Caribbean Queen is crowned. A first runner-up and a second runner-up are named. Additionally, the following awards are given: Miss Congeniality, Most Photogenic, and Most True to the Theme. Notable former Jaycees Caribbean Queens have been Kai Davis, Jermilla Kirwan, Shelana George, and Shermain Jeremy (all four of Antigua), as well as Princess Best (of Barbados).

The pageant is organized by the Junior Chamber International (JCI) of Antigua and Barbuda as of 2023, and is sponsored by the Antigua Cruise Port (ACP) and the Government of Antigua and Barbuda as of 2024.

== Calypso and soca competitions ==
Calypso is central to Antigua's Carnival, and many Caribbean carnivals. Antigua's inaugural Carnival in 1957 featured a calypso competition. Soca has gained popularity in Antigua and Barbuda, surpassing calypso. Today, multiple calypso and soca competitions feature in Antigua's Carnival.

=== Calypso Monarch ===
The Calypso Monarch competition is a celebration and reflection of Antigua's African history and cultural heritage. The calypso competition is one of the most popular shows of the Carnival season. It is also one of Antiguan Carnival's oldest competitions, as it took place as the inaugural Carnival in 1957.

As of 2022, contestants compete in one of two categories: Bacchanal and Social Commentary. The competitors perform an original calypso song. Before 2022, one Calypso Monarch was crowned. Since the format change in 2022, two winners are crowned: one for Bacchanal category and one for the Social Commentary category. Second and third place winners are declared as well.

=== Junior Calypso Monarch ===
The Junior Calypso (or Junior Calypso Monarch) competition seeks to keep the calypso art form alive in the nation's children. The competition is divided into two segments: the 5 to 12 category and the 13 to 19 category. Each child performs an original calypso song and is judged on criteria that include performance, lyrics, clarity, content and use of stage. Two winners are crowned: one from each age category. Second and third place winners are declared for each age group, as well as an award for Most Creative.

Junior Calypso winners have gone on to compete in regional competitions as well as the Calypso Monarch Competition as an adult. Notable winners are: Lyrics Man, Thalia King, Lady Challenger, Young Destroyer, and A'Shante (A'Shante O'Keiffe).

=== Party Monarch ===
The Party Monarch show is a soca competition. It is the biggest and most well-attended show during Carnival. According to the Antigua Barbuda Festivals Commission, the show has attracted crowds as large as 16,000 people.

Ten competitors per segment compete for the title of Party Monarch. The competition is divided into two categories: "Groovy" soca and "Jumpy" (or Up-tempo) soca. Contestants perform original soca songs. Two monarchs are crowned, one for each category. A first runner-up and a second runner-up are named in each category as well.

The Party Monarch competitions are also the fastest growing competition and the soca artists are developing and growing in popularity. Some pundits say that Antigua's soca is swiftly surpassing that of Trinidad. Notable winners of the Party Monarch competition are: Claudette "CP" Peters (winning four times); Mervyn "Sleepy" Edwards (three times); and Toriano "Onyan" Edwards of the Burning Flames.

=== Junior Party Monarch ===
The Junior Part Monarch is a soca competition for youths. It began in 2015. It is divided into two categories: "Groovy" soca and "Jumpy" soca. Each child sings one original soca song. Two winners are crowned: one in each category. A first and second runner-up are named in each category, and other awards may be given to contestants as well, such as Most Punctual.

== Panorama ==
Steel pan is a central part of Antiguan history and culture. The island has many steel bands and steel orchestras (as the larger bands are called), as well as several "pan yards" where steel bands practice. Each year, steel bands compete in Antigua's official steel pan competition, Panorama.

Panorama is a large event during Carnival, as the show has gained massive public interest over the years. During the event, steel bands battle on the main stage in a judged competition. Intense rivalry exists between the steel bands, who compete for the title of 'Panorama Champion'.

The first Panorama competition was held in 1949. The winner was Hell's Gate, the world's oldest operating steel orchestra (founded 1945). Hell's Gate has won first place more than 20 times since the inaugural competition, more times that any other steel band in the country. Other steel bands that have performed at Panorama include: Gemonites, Harmonites, Ebonites, Halcyon, and East Vybes.

== Jam bands ==
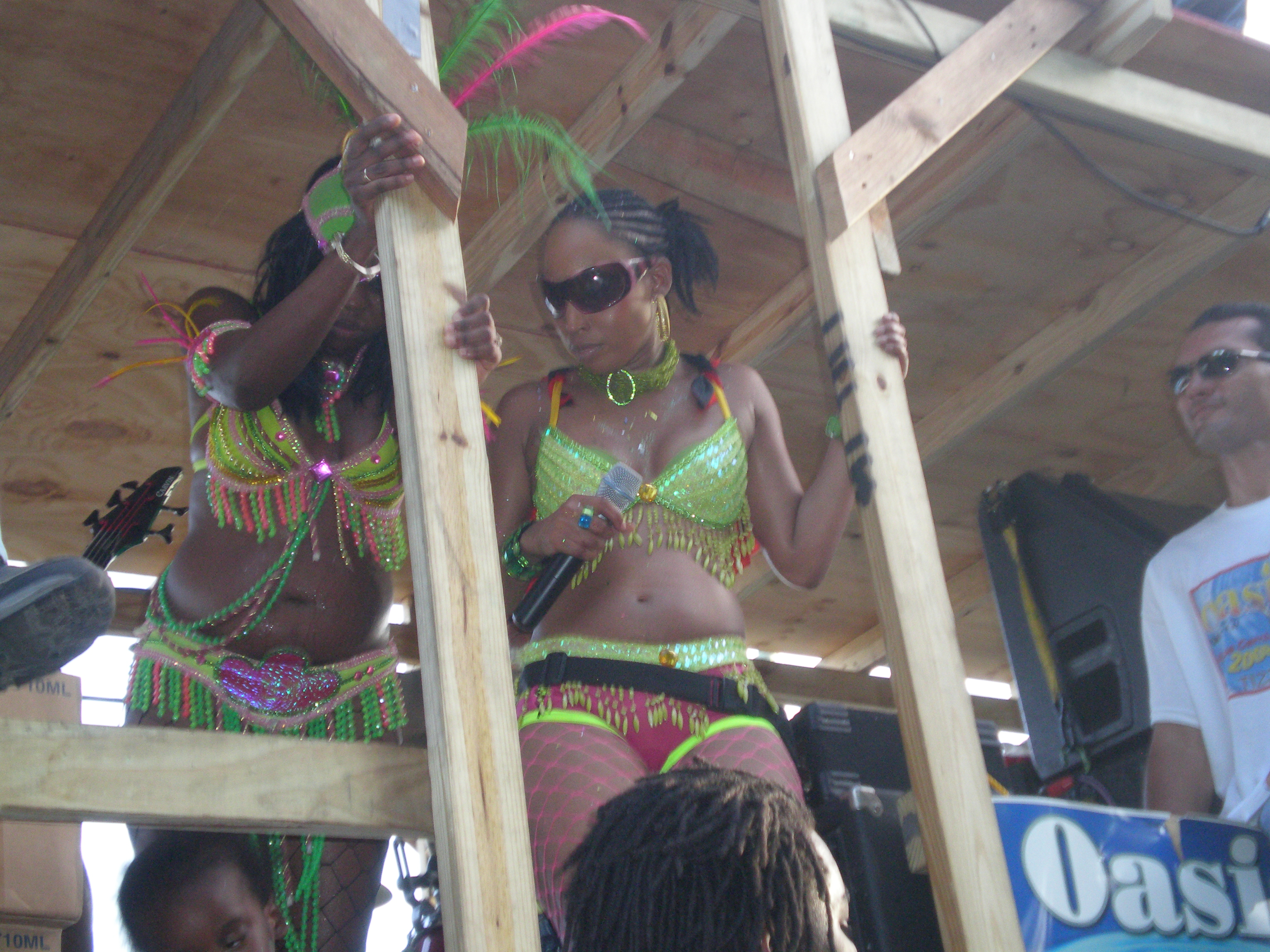
"Tizzy" leading her jam band El-A-Kru on Carnival Tuesday

Jam bands are a significant part of the Carnival festivities. They lead the crowd during parades and they provide the music with which to dance. These bands play mostly soca music. Hundreds of patrons follow behind the various jam bands during Carnival parades such as J'ouvert.

Several bands in Antigua have risen to much acclaim regionally and internationally: Burning Flames, Red Hot Flames, El-A-Kru, Taxik, Revo Band, High Intensity, Lejah Band, Dred and the Bald head, Vision Band, Tonic Band, and Tek Nine.

== Unofficial Carnival events ==
Before and during the carnival season, many events take place that are not planned by the official carnival organizing body (Antigua and Barbuda Festivals Commission, previously Carnival Development Committee). While not official, these events are an important part of the carnival season.

Pre-carnival events such "Blue Jeans", "White Fete, and "Red Eye" are very popular themed parties that usually take place over the weekends of July leading up to carnival. Many pre-carnival events are fundraisers.

"Lions Den" (or Lion's Carnival Dance) is a quintessential carnival jam hosted by the Lions Club Antigua. It is a big rave that draws crowds of thousands. Two of Antigua's biggest bands, the Burning Flames and the Red Hot Flames, often perform. Antigua's Lion's Club first began hosting these carnival dances in the 1980s.

== See also ==
- List of festivals in Antigua and Barbuda
- List of festivals in North America
- Antigua and Barbuda
- Romantic Rhythms Music Festival
- Cricket carnival
- Music of Antigua
- Shermain Jeremy (Former Carnival Queen)
- Burning Flames (Antiguan Soca Band)
- Marie-Elena John (Antiguan novelist whose work highlights the African origins of Caribbean carnival)
