= Claudette Peters =

Antiguan soca and soul singer-songwriter

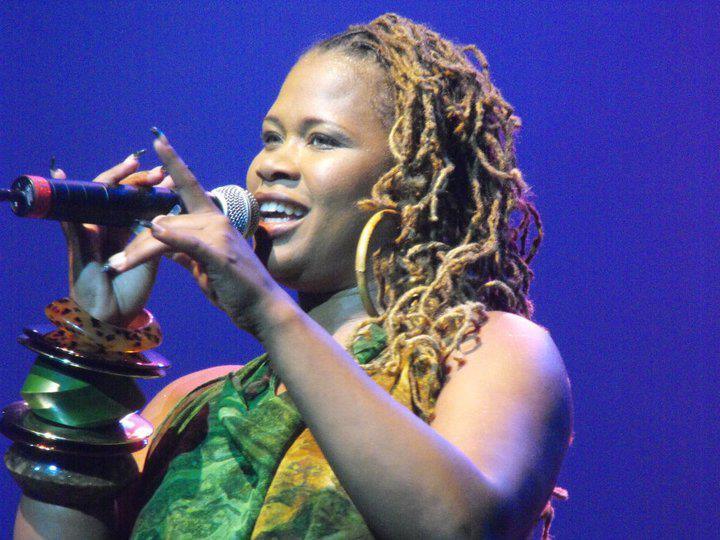

Background information
- Also known as: CP
- Born: Claudette Peters; August 9, 1979 (age 47); St. John's, Antigua and Barbuda
- Genres: Soca, reggae fusion, soul
- Occupation: Singer
- Instrument: Vocals
- Years active: 2002 – present

Claudette 'CP' Peters, OH (born August 9, 1979) is an Antiguan soca and soul singer-songwriter. Peters is best known as Antigua's "Soca Diva" and the country's Queen of Soca. She was the lead vocalist for the Taxik Band. Claudette has won multiple Jumpy and Groovy Party Monarch crowns from Antigua Carnival's annual Party Monarch Competition.

== Early life ==
Peters started singing in Church at the age of nine. She also sang in her schools’ choir. She considers her years as a member of the Anglican Cathedral Youth Choir as her training ground and among her most rewarding experiences. Claudette started her career singing in hotels. After, debuting with "Ken Phoenix and Company" she moved on to be the lead female vocalist for several local bands including Dread & the Baldhead, High Intensity and Da Bhann.

In 1996, Claudette captured the Miss Teenage Pageant title, a feature of Antigua's annual Carnival celebration. About a decade later, she was elevated by her country and the Queen of Antigua and Barbuda to the title of "Order of The Most Princely Heritage (OH)".

== Career ==
Peters first made her mark on the regional and international Soca scene with her hit single "Something's Got A Hold On Me" with Da Bhann in 2002. After which she had a hit yearly for Antigua Carnival's soca competition. Peters eventually left 'Da Bhann' because she felt she could gain more recognition as a solo act. In 2005, Claudette became the first female artist to capture the Antigua Soca Monarch title with the song "All I Know" in which her vocals were compared against soca icon Destra Garcia by the public.

Claudette was named "The Best Female Artist" at the First Annual National Vibes Star Project Awards held in Antigua in 2005. She also captured the "Song of The Year" award at the event. Also in 2005, she was named "The Best Soca Artist" at the Twilight Soca Awards for the song All I Know. The following year, she was nominated for the Best Female and Gospel Artist at the Second Annual National Vibes Star Project Awards. Later that year, with four International Soca Music Awards nominations, she brought home the Best New Female Soca Artist trophy for her song "All I Know" at the International Soca Awards held in New York City.

Claudette dominated the Soca Monarch competition after her "All I Know" win in 2005. Peters won the competition 2005–2008 until she voluntary decided not to enter the competition in 2009.

=== 2010:Return to Soca Monarch-Present ===
Claudette returned to the Soca Monarch competition in 2010 and stated "I didn’t realise I would miss it so much." The year of her return, she captured the groovy section of the show with the song "Still Jamming"

Claudette performed at Tempo's 10th annual celebration of its existence in Antigua, alongside Christopher Martin, Konshens, Asher Otto, Tian Winter, Ziggy Ranking and Tarrus Riley on January 31, 2015. Claudette Peters became the second female Soca singer to release two (2) Soca songs in two separate years when she released Go Claudette Go and Showtime in 2007; and Carnival Day and Bring It On 2008. The first female being Alison Hinds, who released old time ting and tremble in 1994; and bam bam and DJ ride in 1995

Soca Monarch Titles

Groovy Monarch	Jumpy Monarch
2007 – Go Claudette	2005 – All I Know
2008 – Carnival Day	2006 – Make Waves
2010 – Still Jamming	2007 – Showtime
2011 – Werk It	2008 – Bring It On
2015 – Nasty	
2022 – Stressless	
2023 – Nat U	

== Discography ==
=== Singles ===
Title	Year	Peak chart positions	
Title	Year	US	CAN
"Something Got to Hold on Me"	2002	—	—
"All I Know"	2005	—	—
"Make Wave"	2006	—	—
"Showtime"	2007	—	—
"Go Claudette, Go"	2007	—	—
"Bring It On"	2008	—	—
"Still Jamming"	2010	—	—
"Work It"	2011	—	—
"No Tomorrow"	2012	—	—
"Belong to A Flag"	2013	—	—
"Nasty"	2015	—	—
"Out Deh"	2017	—	—
"Arm’s Length"	2018	—	—
"Please Me"	2021	—	—
"Need It"	2022	—	—
"Stressless"	2022	—	—
"Nat U"	2023	—	—
"Love Meh Up"	2023	—	—
"Go So"	2023	—	—
"Praise You"	2024	—	—
"—" denotes single that did not chart or was not released

== Influences ==
Claudette's musical inspirations are drawn from Lauryn Hill, Alison Hinds, Machel Montano among others.
