= King Short Shirt =

Antiguan singer (born 1942)

- Born: MacLean Emanuel; 28 February 1942 (age 84); St John's, Antigua
- Genres: Calypso; gospel music
- Years active: 1962–present
- Labels: A&B/VP, Charlie's

Sir MacLean Emanuel (born 28 February 1942), better known as King Short Shirt, is an Antiguan singer, best known as one of Antigua's longest standing and most successful calypsonians, but later producing gospel music.

== Career ==
MacLean Emanuel was born in St John's, Antigua in 1942. Early indications of a successful musical career manifested themselves in regular appearances in backyard shows and 'breaking up' concerts at the Spring Gardens Moravian School. On the invitation of a friend who knew of his talent, Emanuel traveled to St. Thomas after leaving school in Antigua. There, he landed a day job as a construction worker and a small singing gig at a local bar in the evenings.

He returned to Antigua in 1962 and entered his first calypso competition. The following year he finished as second runner-up with his renditions of "Shakespearean" and "Straight Hair". He also had his first hit single with "Parasites". In 1964, he won with "No Place Like Home" and "Heritage".

Successive wins were secured in 1965 and 1966, then again in 1969 and 1970. In all, he won 15 titles between 1964 and 1992 – his last year of competition – including six wins during his "decade of victory" from 1970 to 1979; No calypsonian before or since has accomplished as much.

In the 1980s he opened his "Shorty's Bar-B-Q" bar/restaurant in Halcyon Bay. His 1987 wedding to Esther Barnes was reportedly the most elaborate wedding in the history of the island.

In 1997, he converted to Christianity. Since his conversion, Brother Emanuel (as he is now known) has largely produced gospel material.

He announced his retirement from competition in 2012 on his 70th birthday. He came out of retirement briefly in 2013 to perform in the local calypso competition, but withdrew before the quarter finals to "give the other guys a chance". He continued to record new material.

In 2002, he received a knighthood from the government of Antigua and Barbuda for his contributions to the promotion of calypso.

In July 2015, he was hospitalised after suffering breathing problems and chest pains; He was diagnosed with blocked arteries and was unable to attend the 2015 carnival.

King Short Shirt was the subject of Dr. James Edwin Knight's documentary King Short Shirt: The Making of the Monarch.

== Lyrical themes ==
The Monarch's legacy is one of scathing social commentary against injustice of all kinds. His lyrics included black power themes is songs such as "Black Like Me" and "Afro Antiguan". "Lamentation" (1973) was an indication of the disillusionment he felt.

"Power and Authority", "Cry for a Change", and "Unity" are examples of his calypsos with political messages. "Send You King", "Uneasy Head" and "Hands Off Harmonites" deal with his feelings on the process for judging calypso and steelband competitions.

He has also included topical themes such as the Beatles receiving MBEs ("Beatles MBE"), the assassination of Martin Luther King Jr., the Moon landings, and the rise of Rastafari.

== Titles ==
Short Shirt was the most successful challenger for the coveted Road March title, with seven wins including such songs as "Lucinda", "Jammin", "Summer Festival" and "J'Ouvert Rhythm". The 1976 hit "Tourist Leggo", which placed second at Trinidad and Tobago's Road March to Lord Kitchener's "Flag Woman", created such a stir during Trinidad's Carnival that it forced that country's authorities to initiate a ban on all foreign tunes from the Road March competition. It did, however, win the Antiguan Road March. He also won the local Calypso Monarch crown 15 times and the regional calypso crown seven times.

== Discography ==
- Spiced and Styled (1973), A & B
- Ghetto Vibes (1976), Charlie's
- Illusion (1977), A & B
- Wadadlie Rock (1978), Remy
- Press On (1979), A & B
- Summer Festival (1980), Charlie's
- Leroy (1982), A & B
- Hang On (1983), A & B
- Power Pack (1986), B's
- 25th Anniversary (1987), WB
- Gée We Music (1988), A & B
- The Spirit of Carnival (198?), A & B
- The Message (2001), A & B
- Don’t Stop the Music (2002), A & B
- The Standard (2003), A & B
- Speaking Out (2005), A & B

Compilations

- Non-Stop Dancing: #1 Calypsos (2000), ParrotFish
- Road March Classics (2003), A & B
- Early Years (2007), A & B
- Social Commentaries Classics Pt.1 (2009), A & B/VP
- Social Commentary Part2 (2009), A & B
- Master Of Melody (2009), A & B/VP
- Forever (2009), A & B/VP
- Tribute to the Virgin Isles (2009), A & B/VP
