= Folk communication =

Communication via folklore-based popular media channels

Folk communication (from the Portuguese folkcomunicação), also rendered as folk communication, is a communication theory concept referring to the expression and exchange of opinions, ideas, and attitudes through agents and channels derived from folklore and popular culture. It was coined by Brazilian scholar Luiz Beltrão de Andrade Lima in March 1965. The theory bridges the study of traditional communicative forms and mass media, and have become a distinct field of study within communication research, especially in Brazil.

== Origins ==
Folk communication originated in Brazil in the 1960s as a theoretical framework within the social communication sciences. It was developed by Brazilian journalist, professor, and researcher Luiz Beltrão de Andrade Lima (1918–1986), who sought to understand how marginalized populations created and sustained their own forms of communication outside institutional mass media. The term folk communication is a direct translation of folkcomunicação, coined by Lima to capture the intersection of folklore (folk) and communication, reflecting his insight that popular agents and practices used to share information outside institutional systems were deeply rooted in folkloric traditions.

Beltrão’s interest in alternative forms of information dissemination began after observing how traditional expressions of popular culture—such as oral storytelling, ex-votos, and festivals—served communicative functions in communities often excluded from mainstream discourse. Lima's reflections emerged in the context of Brazil's sharp economic disparities and cultural diversity, where many citizens lacked access to dominant channels like newspapers, radio, and television. His first published articulation of the theory appeared in March 1965, in a scholarly article that examined the ex-voto as a journalistic medium. Enrolling in the inaugural doctoral program in Communication at the University of Brasília, Lima presented his thesis in 1967 under the title Folkcomunicação: um estudo dos agentes e dos meios populares de informação de fatos e expressão de ideias ("Folk communication: a study of the agents and the popular means of information of facts and expression of ideas"). However, dissemination of his ideas was hindered during the military dictatorship in Brazil (1964–1985), as the theory implicitly critiqued public policies by recognizing the political and expressive dimensions of popular culture.

== Concept ==
Folk communication is defined by Lima as the exchange of information and expression of opinions, ideas, and attitudes among the masses through agents and means rooted in folklore and popular culture. These include storytellers, street vendors, festival performers, and religious figures who act as intermediaries between the masses and dominant communication systems.

The theory highlights the role of "folk communicators"—opinion leaders who interpret mass media content for their communities and relay local concerns back to formal institutions. This aligns with the multi-step flow theory of communication proposed by Elihu Katz and Paul Lazarsfeld. These mediators help translate, filter, and contextualize information, making it accessible to audiences who may be excluded due to cultural, geographic, economic, or ideological barriers.
