= Antigua Sailing Week =

Yacht regatta

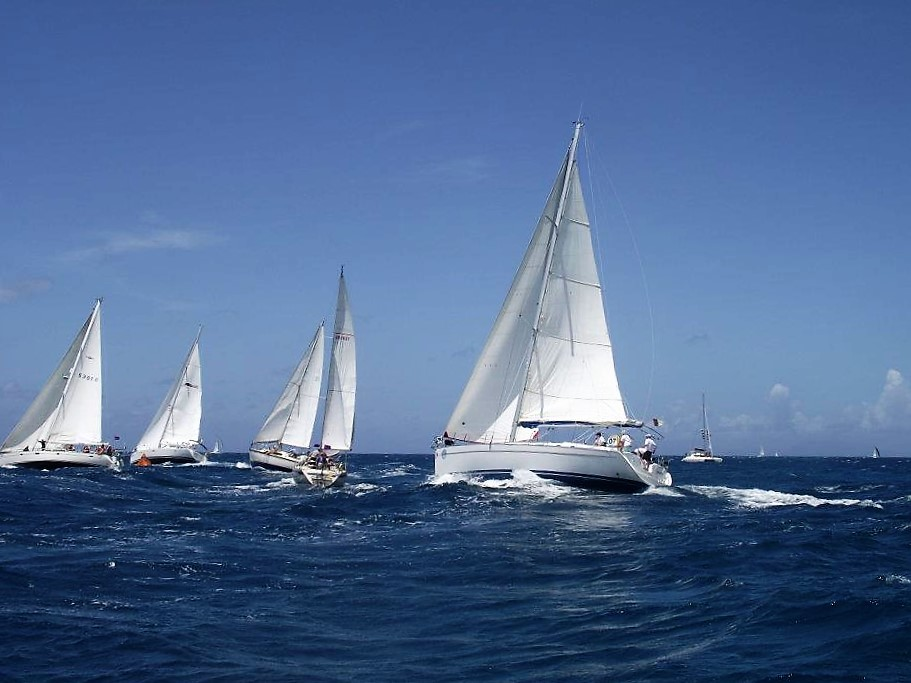
- Impression of the Antigua Sailing Week 2012
- Location: Antigua and Barbuda
- Event type: Regatta
- Established: 1967; 59 years ago
- Website: www.sailingweek.com

Antigua Sailing Week is a week long yacht regatta held in the waters off English Harbour, St Pauls Antigua. It is one of Antigua's most notable events. Founded in 1967, it is cited as one of the top regattas in the world with 100 yachts, 1500 participants and 5000 spectators on average annually. At its heyday, the event attracted an average 150-200 yachts In 2019 the regatta was held between 27 April and 3 May and the 2020 saw the first ever cancellation due to the COVID-19 pandemic. In 2019, 24 countries were represented at the regatta. There are five main races held, including the English Harbour race, and at the end of the week the event finishes with an official prize-giving ceremony presided by the Governor-General.
